= X2 (roller coaster) =

Roller coaster at Magic Mountain

- Previously known as X (2002–2007)
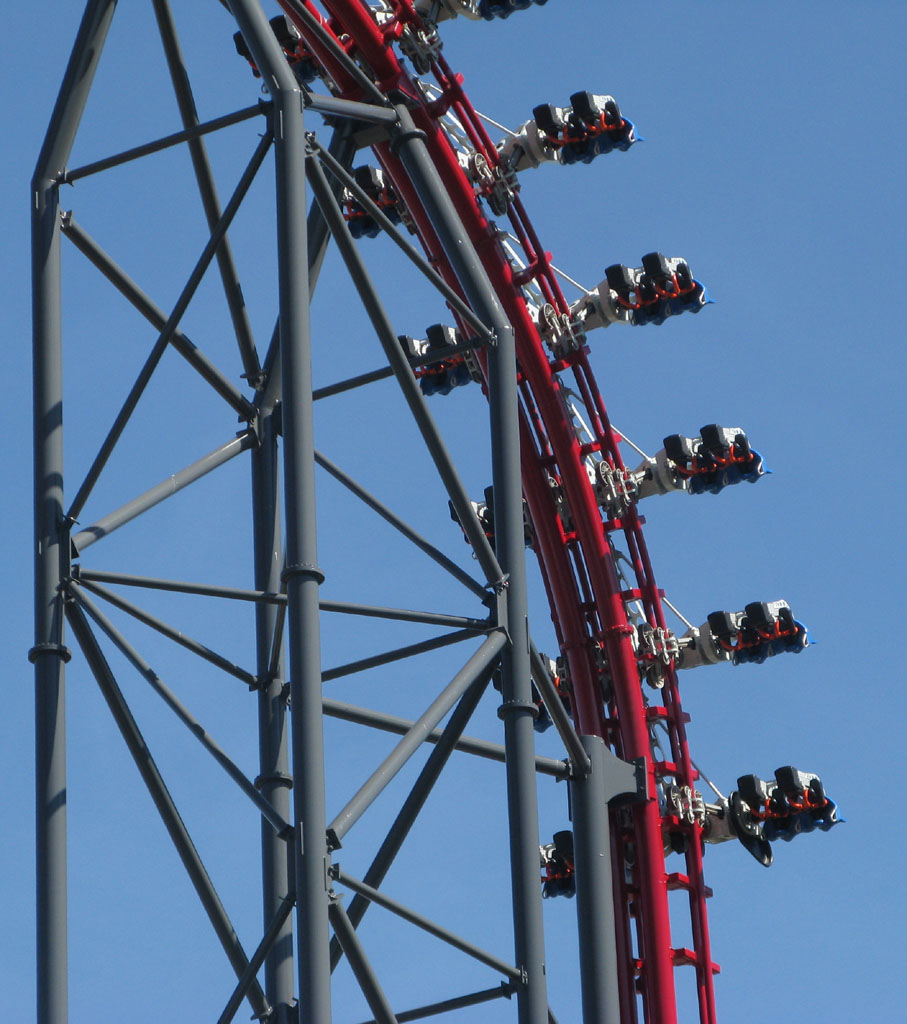
- X2's first drop

Six Flags Magic Mountain
- Location: Six Flags Magic Mountain
- Park section: Baja Ridge
- Coordinates: 34.421005°N 118.592885°W
- Status: Closed
- Soft opening date: December 24, 2001
- Opening date: January 12, 2002
- Closing date: July 12, 2026
- Cost: $45 million (2002) $10 million (2008)

General statistics
- Type: Steel – 4th Dimension
- Manufacturer: Arrow Dynamics
- Designer: Alan Schilke
- Model: 4th Dimension Coaster
- Lift/launch system: Chain Lift
- Height: 175 ft (53 m)
- Drop: 215 ft (66 m)
- Length: 3,610 ft (1,100 m)
- Speed: 76 mph (122 km/h)
- Inversions: 2
- Max vertical angle: 88.5°
- Capacity: 1600 riders per hour
- G-force: 4
- Height restriction: 48 in (122 cm)
- Trains: 3 trains with 7 cars; riders arranged 4 across in a single row for a total of 28 riders per train
- Must transfer from wheelchair
- X2 at RCDB

X2 (formerly X) is a decommissioned steel roller coaster at Six Flags Magic Mountain in Valencia, California, United States. Manufactured by Arrow Dynamics, it opened on January 12, 2002, as the world's first fourth-dimension roller coaster and was the company's final coaster installation. The ride featured seats that rotated 360 degrees forward and backward independently of the train's main chassis. Originally scheduled to debut in summer 2001, the coaster experienced delays before opening the following year.

The ride underwent a $10 million transformation into X2 in 2007–2008, receiving several upgrades including lighter trains, a new restraint system, and onboard audio. X2 closed permanently in September 2026 amid allegations of brain injuries from more than 100 riders.

== History ==
According to designer Alan Schilke, the concept for X was first conceived during his childhood, inspired by his interest in the Zipper carnival ride. It was later developed at Arrow Dynamics as part of an internal "mystery project", with Schilke creating an animation of a car performing a backflip. He recalled that the animation "sat in my desk for another 3 years" and that Cedar Point showed little interest when Arrow presented the concept there. Schilke later showed the animation to Six Flags executive Gary Story, who decided to pursue the project.

Story wanted the ride built on a much larger scale than Arrow had originally envisioned, leading the company to construct a roughly 20-foot (6.1 m) prototype before moving forward. Schilke later said the project was overly ambitious for a first-of-its-kind ride and would have benefited from starting smaller, but Arrow could not pass up the opportunity to build a "dream ride" on that scale.

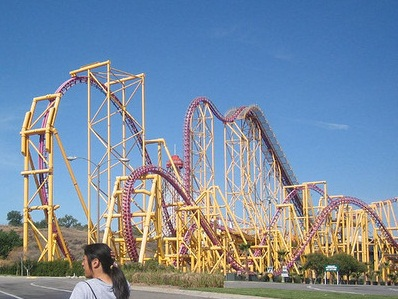
An overview of the track when the ride was known as X

On December 19, 2000, Six Flags Magic Mountain announced X as one of three roller coasters planned for the 2001 season as part of a $30 million expansion, along with Goliath Jr. and Déjà Vu. The additions would increase the park's coaster total to 15, surpassing Cedar Point amid what the Times Recorder described as a "coaster war" between the parks. X was a prototype of Arrow Dynamics' 4th Dimension roller coaster design.

X was originally scheduled to open in summer 2001, but its debut was delayed. Arrow Dynamics filed for Chapter 11 bankruptcy on December 3, 2001, after misjudging the cost of the project and losing millions of dollars on X. At the time of the filing, Arrow had not finished fabricating all of the ride's steel, leaving Six Flags to complete the remaining fabrication and construction work. The ride eventually opened to season passholders on December 24, 2001, and to the general public on January 12, 2002. Its final cost was estimated at $45 million.

Several months into its debut season, X closed in June 2002 after maintenance crews discovered that one of its rotating seats was not moving smoothly. Following modifications to the ride, it reopened on August 13.

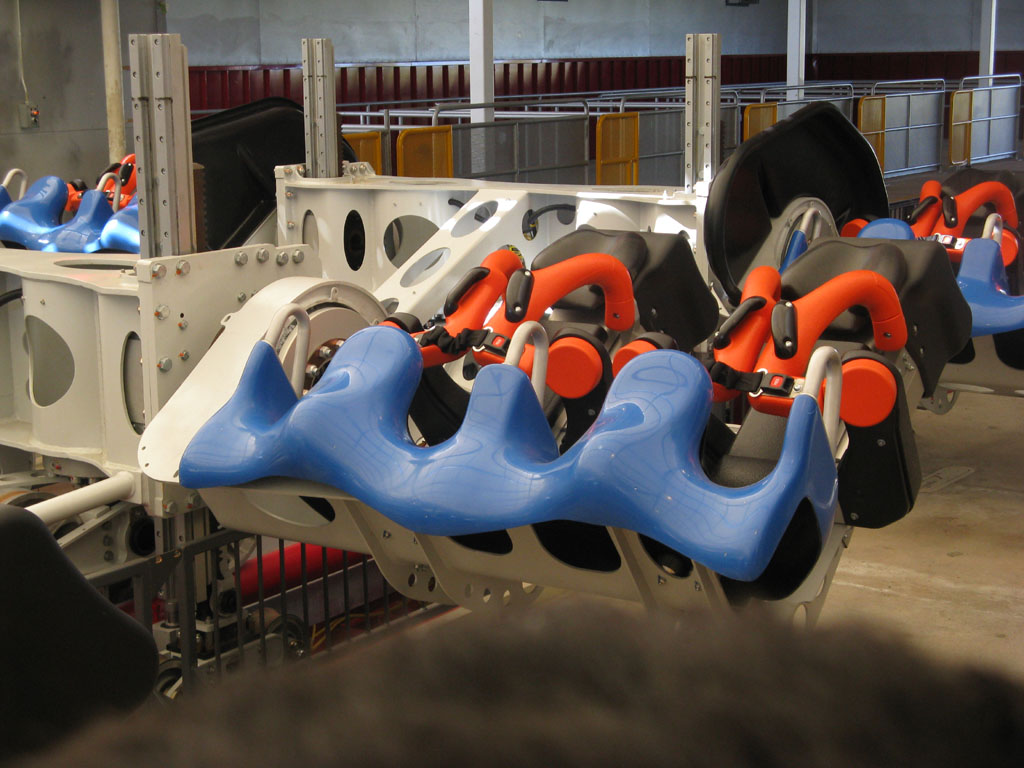
One of the new trains during testing

In November 2007, Six Flags announced a $10 million overhaul of X, which closed later that year for its transformation into X2. The refurbishment included redesigned trains that were substantially lighter than the originals, with each vehicle reduced by about 1,700 pounds (770 kg). Air-released restraints replaced the original mechanical system, while the trains also received onboard audio and revised wheel assemblies. S&S Power participated in the overhaul, including upgrades to the trains and onboard audio system. The transformation also added new visual and sensory effects, including a tunnel and light sequence. X2 reopened on May 24, 2008.

On July 12, 2026, the ride closed down as a result of an investigation due to riders reporting brain injuries as well as a fatality. On September 29, 2026, the park announced that the ride's closure would be permanent.

== Ride experience ==
The 3,610-foot (1,100-metre) layout featured two raven turn inversions, while the seats rotated independently of the track throughout the ride. Each pair of seats could rotate 360 degrees forward or backward, with the movement controlled by two additional rails that run alongside the main track, giving X2 four rails instead of the traditional two.

=== Layout ===
After leaving the station, the train made a 180-degree turn over the queue and began ascending the lift hill with riders facing backward. After reaching the 175-foot (53 m) peak, the train entered a pre-drop, followed by a brief ascent before entering the 215-foot (66-metre) first drop, which is sloped at 88.5 degrees. During the descent, the train reached a maximum speed of 76 mph (122 km/h).

During the initial drop, the seat assembly rotated so that riders faced the ground. A fog effect was originally used at the base of the drop. The train then entered an inside raven turn, where the seats rotated in a "lie-to-fly" maneuver, transitioning riders from lying on their backs facing backward to a prone, forward-facing position. After exiting the raven turn, the train traversed a hill while the seat assemblies rotate backward 360 degrees, simulating a backflip. This was followed by a sweeping fan turn and a 180-degree "fly-to-lie" maneuver that returned riders to a position lying on their backs and facing backward. Flame effects activated overhead as the train entered an outside raven turn, followed by another 180-degree seat rotation. The track then leveled out as the train entered the final brake run before it returned to the station.

=== Trains ===
X2 used a prototype train design in which the seats rotated 360 degrees forward or backward in a controlled motion. The track consisted of four rails: two support the train, while two additional rails control the rotation of the seats through a rack and pinion mechanism. The rotation rails rose and fell relative to the main track, causing the seats to rotate throughout the ride.

Weighing 5 tonnes (4.9 long tons; 5.5 short tons), each vehicle spanned 20 feet (6.1 m), with riders seated in pairs on either side of the track. Four 1-foot-tall (0.30 m) rack gears beneath each vehicle followed the profile of the rotation rails to control the movement of the seats.

As part of the conversion to X2, an onboard audio system was added to the trains, featuring five songs along with dialogue and quotes from several films:

- Harry Connick Jr. – "It Had To Be You" (as the train exited the station)
- Portions of R. Lee Ermey's dialogue from Full Metal Jacket, along with other film quotes (during the lift hill)
- Metallica – "Enter Sandman" (during the lift hill)
- Aerosmith – "Love in an Elevator" (as the train crested the first drop)
- Beastie Boys – "Sabotage" (during the course of the ride)
- Rage Against the Machine – "Wake Up" (after the train entered the final brake run)

== Similar roller coasters ==
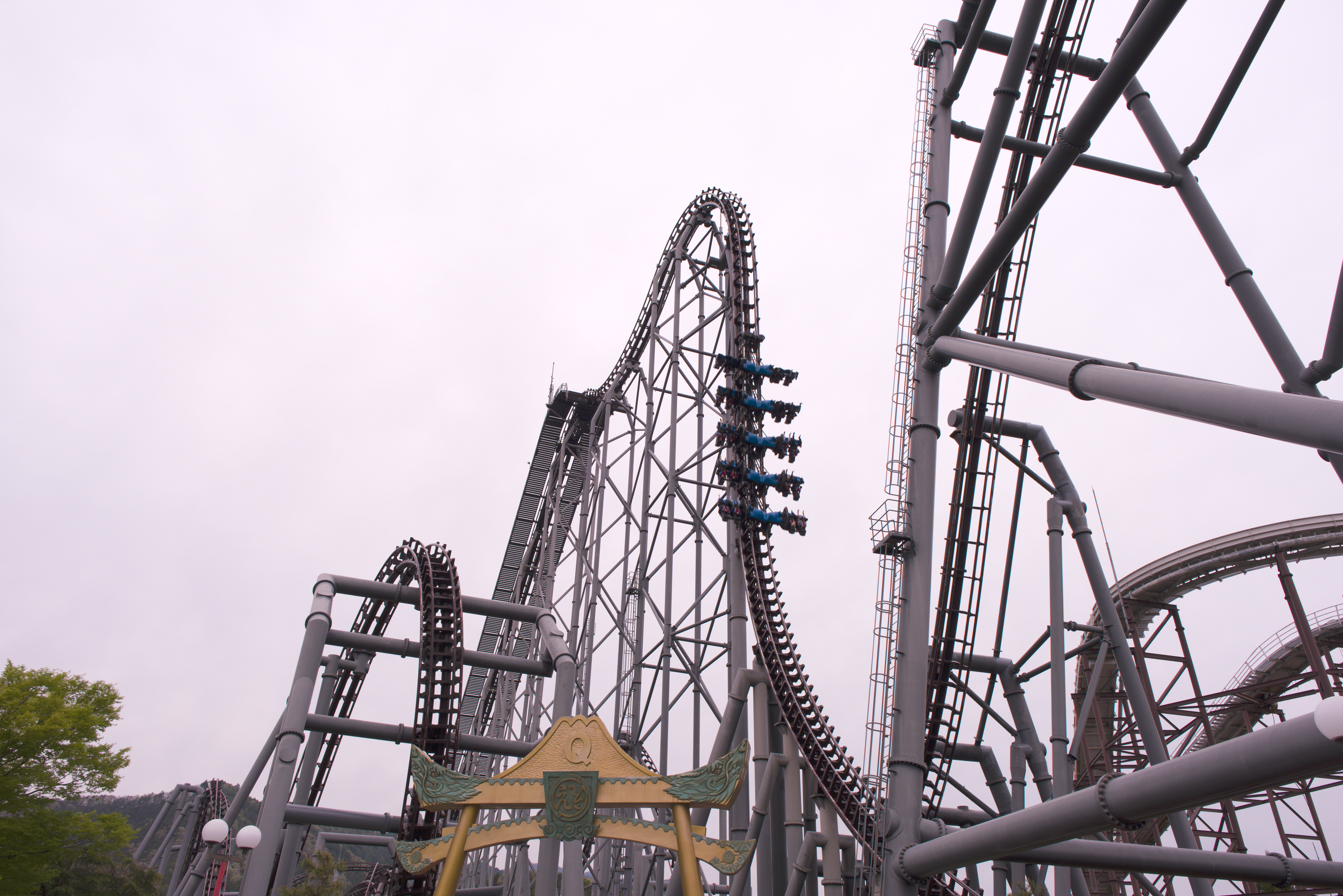

S&S Arrow opened the second roller coaster of this type, Eejanaika at Fuji-Q Highland in Fujiyoshida, Yamanashi, Japan. Eejanaika (a word with a complex social and political background in Japan) has several meanings, however, "Isn't it great" or "Who cares" are some relevant meanings. This second 4th Dimension coaster is very similar to X2, but differs in height (Eejanaika is 250 feet (76 m) tall), and some elements are altered, such as the first 'half-half' element, in which the trains rotate on the track one half turn as the seats also rotate one-half turn, has now been replaced with a 'full-full' element, in which the train rotates on the track for one full turn as the seats rotate one full turn. The turn back towards the lift hill on Eejanaika is a true overbanked turn, while on X2 this turn was not. Dinoconda, a third 4th Dimension coaster, opened at Dinosaur Valley in Shanghai, China in May 2012.

== Incidents ==
On June 23, 2022, a 22-year-old man suffered a severe brain injury after riding X2 and died the following day while being treated at a nearby hospital for brain bleeding. According to a wrongful-death lawsuit filed by his family, he complained of head pain and collapsed after exiting the ride. The complaint cited the coroner's office as attributing his death to head trauma caused by a "park ride accident". Six Flags denied the lawsuit's claims. The family reached undisclosed settlements with Six Flags Magic Mountain and S&S Worldwide in August 2026.

In July 2026, two women suffered severe brain hemorrhages after riding X2 six days apart and underwent emergency brain surgery. One of the riders remained hospitalized and unresponsive more than two months later, receiving respiratory care while attempting to be weaned from a ventilator. According to medical records reviewed by CNN, physicians treating the women attributed the injuries to sudden changes in speed and motion on the ride. X2 closed on July 12, and Cal/OSHA subsequently opened an investigation into the July 5 incident. The attraction remained closed as the investigation continued into September.

In September 2026, three new lawsuits were filed alleging that riders had suffered severe brain injuries after riding X2. Attorneys for the plaintiffs said more than 100 other riders had reported brain injuries and that additional lawsuits were expected. In prior litigation, S&S Worldwide disputed allegations that X2 caused traumatic brain injuries, citing post-incident testing in one case and biomechanical analysis in another. Six Flags declined to comment on the pending litigation.

== Awards ==
Golden Ticket Awards: Top steel Roller Coasters
Year									1998	1999
Ranking									–	–
Year	2000	2001	2002	2003	2004	2005	2006	2007	2008	2009
Ranking	–	–	20	15	15	32	30	17	16	13
Year	2010	2011	2012	2013	2014	2015	2016	2017	2018	2019
Ranking	15	16	18	16	18	20	23	25	31	23 (tie)
Year	2020	2021	2022	2023	2024	2025	2026			
Ranking	N/A	26 (tie)	32	21	32 (tie)	41 (tie)	32			
