= Incidents at European amusement parks =

This is a summary of notable incidents that have taken place at various European amusement parks, water parks, or theme parks. This list is not intended to be a comprehensive list of every such event, but only those that have a significant impact on the parks or park owners, or are otherwise significantly newsworthy.

== Alton Towers, Staffordshire, England ==
=== Congo River Rapids ===
- In 1999, a park employee nearly drowned after he slipped and became stuck between a raft and a turntable that powered the ride.

=== Oblivion ===
- On 8 May 2012, a 20-year-old man entered a restricted area of the ride and walked into the tunnel. He was rescued by fire crews. The ride resumed operation the following day.
- On 25 July 2017, passengers were evacuated from the ride after a train stopped at the top of the lift hill. No injuries were reported.

=== Sky Ride ===
- On 30 June 2004, due to a strong gust of wind, the Sky Ride cables became caught, jamming the ride. About 80 people were on the ride, and nine people had to be rescued by being abseiled down 60-metre (200 ft) cables.
- During the 2007 Scarefest season, a fire broke out in the Forbidden Valley section of the park due to a halogen lamp that damaged the roof and mechanics of the ride. The damage was repairable, but the ride had to be closed for six months before reopening midway through the 2008 season. There were no injuries.
- The Sky Ride suffered a second fire on the night of 21 July 2009, in The Towers section of the park, due to a faulty vending machine. The fire destroyed the station. Over the following season, the station was rebuilt, and was ready for the 2010 season.

=== Runaway Mine Train ===
- On 20 July 2006, when the train was entering the tunnel section of its course, it split into two halves, leaving the rear part behind with the front part continuing up the hill. The front half of the train did not make it over the slope, rolled back into the tunnel, and collided with the rear half. Six people were taken to hospital, including two women with leg injuries, and 23 others were treated for cuts and bruises. Following the incident, the ride was closed for the remainder of the 2006 season and reopened in April 2007.

=== The Smiler ===
- On 2 November 2013, four people were injured after being hit by flying guide wheels when they fell off one of the trains.
- On 2 June 2015, a train with 16 passengers collided at 71 km/h (44 mph) with a stationary empty train that had valleyed after failing to complete an inversion due to high winds. The ride computer system acknowledged that the empty train had stopped and halted the train with the passengers at the top of the first lift hill. As a result of improper training and pressure to get the ride running again as a salary incentive, staff believed the error was a glitch, and so the ride was manually reset with the second train being released over the lift hill. Four passengers — two male, two female, aged between 17 and 27 — suffered serious leg injuries and were airlifted to nearby hospitals for treatment. One casualty required amputation of her left leg while a second had to have her right leg amputated. A fifth person with neck and abdominal injuries was also taken to hospital. The theme park was closed until 8 June 2015 pending the completion of the investigation. The incident was investigated by the Health and Safety Executive (HSE), and a criminal investigation concluded that the crash was not caused by individual staff error. This accident also caused Spinball Whizzer and three other roller coasters at sister parks Thorpe Park and Chessington World of Adventures to close until safety procedures were evaluated; these rides reopened shortly afterwards. The Smiler reopened on 19 March 2016. Merlin Entertainments pled guilty to a breach of Health and Safety Legislation, and was subsequently fined £5,000,000.

=== Toxicator ===
- On 15 March 2025, the ride was shut down for roughly 2 hours and 45 minutes on its opening day due to a sewage pipe burst.

== Attractiepark Slagharen, Slagharen, Netherlands ==
=== El Torito ===
- On 17 May 2009, when the ride was known as "Octopus", a woman and her 7-year-old nephew were injured when the ride was started too early, causing them to be pulled along the ground for a few meters.

== Battersea Park Funfair, Wandsworth, London, England ==
=== Big Dipper ===
- On 30 May 1972, a train car on the roller coaster started to climb the cable hill when the cable snapped. With no anti-rollback device on this attraction, the train rolled back into the station colliding with the other train. Five children were killed and thirteen others injured. Big Dipper (the park's main attraction) was permanently closed, leading to the funfair's commercial decline and its eventual closure at the end of the 1974 season.

== Blackpool Pleasure Beach Resort, Lancashire, England ==
=== Avalanche ===
- On 28 August 1994, ten people suffered minor injuries when one of the coaster trains collided into another parked at the station. All were treated at a local hospital.
- In 1997, the train jumped on the brakes, causing it to crash into itself. One boy was taken to hospital with bruised ribs. This incident was shown on the BBC TV documentary about Blackpool Pleasure Beach in 1998.

=== Big Dipper ===
- On 11 August 2009, two trains carrying a total of 32 guests collided, resulting in 21 guests requiring treatment at a nearby hospital for injuries ranging from whiplash and broken noses, to cuts and bruises.
- On 23 July 2026, a full train on the Big Dipper coaster stopped mid ride and rolled backwards. In the incident while rolling backwards, The train ripped several wooden beams out of the centre of the track and one car on the train derailed but remained fully upright. The park confirmed that no one was injured following the incident and there would be an investigation. The ride will remain closed until further notice. The park has been criticised for only offering riders on the ride a free meal at Burger King within the attraction.

=== Big One ===
- On 31 August 2000, 23 people were injured, when two trains collided due to a failure of the ride's braking system.
- On 14 June 2011, a train stopped abruptly, causing minor injuries to its occupants. One person was reported to be hospitalised with whiplash injury.

=== Derby Racer ===
- On 9 August 2023, a small fire broke out in the maintenance bay underneath the attraction. No one was harmed in the fire, and it was quickly extinguished by emergency services.

=== Grand National ===
- In May 2004, due to an electrical fault, the entire ride station, along with parts of two other rides, were completely destroyed by a fire. Firefighters used water from the nearby Valhalla ride to put the fire out. The Grand National's station was rebuilt, and the ride reopened on 28 October 2004 after all repairs were completed.
- On 24 October 2014, 58-year-old Robert Sycamore broke his neck while riding the Grand National with his 13-year-old nephew. Upon returning to the station, he was slumped in the carriage and rushed to Royal Preston Hospital. After the accident, Sycamore was said to be 'paralysed from the neck down' but it is unclear whether he since made some recovery. It is believed that Sycamore suffered from spondylitis, a spinal condition, but medical professionals are unsure whether this contributed to the accident.

=== Space Invader 2 ===
- On 21 July 2000, 11-year-old Christopher Sherratt died after falling out of a ride vehicle on the Space Invader roller coaster. Reports say that he may have panicked on the dark ride and unfastened his seatbelt. As a result of the accident, the ride was closed and carriages were re-fitted with over-the-shoulder restraints. The ride opened after a short hiatus as Space Invader 2.

== Bridlington Bayside Fun Park, Bridlington, England ==
=== Jungle River Log Flume ===
- On 29 August 2011, a 58-year-old woman sustained severe leg injuries when the Jungle River Log Flume became stuck and jolted, throwing her out of the cabin. She was riding with her four-year-old granddaughter when the accident happened. It is believed that the ride stalled as it didn't have enough water in it. The granddaughter was taken to hospital with minor bruising.

== Bobbejaanland, Lichtaart, Belgium ==
=== Bobby Drop ===
- On 22 March 2008, a 7-year-old child fell out of a boat, after standing up during the ride and colliding with another boat. He was taken to the first aid station. The attraction remained open.

== Botton's Amusement Park, Skegness, England ==
=== Surf Rider ===
- On 30 August 2011 at 3:15pm, emergency services were called to the ride - an A.R.M - Amusement Refurbishment & Manufacture Ali Baba - after reports that the arm collapsed. Firefighters used ropes and ladders to rescue the 22 passengers who had become lodged at a 90 degree angle. Seven passengers were injured and taken to hospital, including one woman with life-threatening head injuries. It was reported that the ride had maintenance done in the previous few days, and insufficient oil levels in the gearboxes contributed to the accident. Pleasure Beach Amusement Parks was fined £8000 due to breaching the Health and Safety at Work Act and were also made to pay £8000 of costs. Surf Rider was removed and now travels around the London area as 'Ali Baba'.

== Brighton Palace Pier, Brighton, East Sussex, England ==
=== Air Race ===
- On 8 April 2019, a teenage boy got a leg injury from being hit by a piece of the ride that came loose.

== Camelot Theme Park, Lancashire, England ==
=== Excalibur 2 ===
- On 23 August 2011, a 12-year-old boy fell from the ride. Witnesses say the boy clung to the ride until he fell 9 m (30 ft).

=== The Gauntlet ===
- On 22 October 2001, 59-year-old employee Harry Mathews was killed as he was struck by an oncoming train while performing maintenance on the ride following an issue earlier in the day. Mathews suffered severe injuries and was pronounced dead at the scene by medical professionals. Prime Resorts Limited was fined £40,000 and ordered to pay £20,000 costs, after a court decided the death was caused by fundamental management errors.

== Chessington World of Adventures, London, England ==
=== Tomb Blaster ===
- On 7 June 2012, a 4-year-old girl fell from an elevated walkway used as the queue for the Tomb Blaster attraction. She suffered broken ribs, a cracked skull, and brain hemorrhage after falling 4.3 m (14 ft) through a hole in the wooden fencing. Chessington World of Adventures Operations Ltd. pled guilty to Health and Safety offences and was fined £150,000 as a result of the fall. Operator Merlin Entertainments apologised and said that it had since spent millions on remedial work across the park to ensure something similar could never occur again. One improvement involved adding a steel rail fence to the Tomb Blaster queue.

== Coney Beach Pleasure Park, Porthcawl, Wales ==
=== Water Chute ===
- On 1 April 1994, a 9-year-old boy was killed after being flung off the 58-year-old "Water Chute" ride when a steel hoop collapsed in wet and windy conditions and fell onto the open-topped carriage in which he was travelling. Five others in the same carriage were treated for injuries, including his father and brother, who sustained severe face, chest and shoulder injuries.

== Drayton Manor Resort, Staffordshire, England ==
=== Maelstrom ===
- On 3 August 2012, a 42-year-old woman collapsed and died of a heart attack after exiting the Maelstrom ride. It has been stated that the woman was on a day out with her 14-year-old daughter, who later posted on Facebook "RIP Momma, I love you".

=== Splash Canyon ===
- On 9 May 2017, an 11-year-old girl on a school trip fell out of a raft on the Splash Canyon Rapids after it hit a bumper while she was standing up, knocking her into the water. She then climbed an 'algae-covered travelator' before slipping and falling into a deeper pool of water where she drowned. The girl was airlifted to Birmingham Children's Hospital, but was proclaimed dead from her drowning soon after arrival. As a result of this accident, Merlin Parks closed three rapids rides - Congo River Rapids, Rumba Rapids and Vikings' River Splash, while Splash Canyon underwent investigation. The ride remained closed until summer 2021. The ride reopened in 2021 after increasing its height restriction from 1.2 to 1.3 m (47 to 51 in) and barring those under the age of 14 from riding without a responsible person above the age of 16.

== Dreamland Margate, Margate, Kent, England ==
=== Scenic Railway ===
- On August 10, 2024, a train on the Scenic Railway roller coaster derailed and collided with one of the brake pads, causing damage to part of the structure. No injuries were reported.

== Duinrell, Wassenaar, Netherlands ==
=== Mad Mill ===
- On 14 April 2007, one part of the attraction broke off, but nobody was harmed.

== Efteling, Kaatsheuvel, Netherlands ==
=== Efteling Steam Train Company ===
- On 30 May 2023, the train collided with a concrete bogie near the roller coasters Joris en de Draak. Several visitors sustained minor injuries.

=== Fata Morgana ===
- On 18 February 2018, a woman broke her leg after she fell out of her mobility scooter while getting into the boat.

=== Gondoletta ===
- On 29 May 2012, four teenage boys overturned their boat after rocking it back and forth. One got stuck underneath the boat and had to be taken to hospital, but fortunately suffered no lasting damages.
- On 25 August 2015, three people were injured when a tree fell onto their boat.

=== Piraña ===
- On 29 April 2018, a 22-year-old woman fell out of her boat and was knocked unconscious (according to the park because she stood up during the ride). She was taken to hospital, where it turned out that she was paralyzed from the hips down.

=== Python ===
- On 30 July 2007, the roller coaster got stuck on the lifthill. A staff member started evacuating the train while another tried to pull the car back. Evacuation of the back two cars shifted the train's centre of mass to the front and it started moving again, completing the rest of the circuit. One staff member suffered some scrapes, bruises, and a mild concussion. The safety belt of one passenger was open at the time, but they were able to close it in time.

=== Swiss Bob ===
- On 30 October 2010, one train had to be removed from the track. The following train collided with it at low speed.

== Energylandia, Zator, Poland ==
=== Hyperion ===
- On 16 August 2018, a 37-year-old employee of the park was hit by a train on the Hyperion roller coaster when picking up a cell phone, which had been dropped in the station by one of the guests. Shortly after he died due to the injuries.

== Europa Park, Rust, Germany ==
=== Arthur in the Kingdom of Minimoys ===
- During work on the not-yet-opened new-for-2014 attraction "Arthur in the Kingdom of Minimoys" in Europa-Park, there was an accident in which two employees of a third-party company for ropes and nets were hit by a roller coaster car. One worker suffered life-threatening injuries and later died in hospital. The two workers were working near the roller coaster on a lifting platform. During the work, the attraction is said to have been in test operation, and several roller coaster cars drove past the workers. Eventually, both were hit by a car, police said. It remains unclear why the workers stayed in the restricted area near the track during the test operation despite warnings (loudspeaker announcements), clearly violating the safety regulations.

=== Euro-Mir ===
- In July 2004, a power failure caused the brake on one gondola of Euro-Mir to release prematurely, causing it to collide with another gondola at low speed. One rider broke his leg, while others were reported to have received cervical spine syndrome from the incident.
- In August 2013, a man freed himself from the ride's safety bar. The man fell onto an escape route running alongside the rails and injured his leg, but was otherwise unharmed.

=== EP Express ===
- On 18 August 2018, two panoramic trains from EP Express collided with each other. It was later reported that two people were slightly injured.

=== Pirates in Batavia ===
- On Saturday, 26 May 2018, a large fire destroyed the ride and parts of the Dutch- and Scandinavian-themed areas. Seven first responders suffered smoke inhalation. No visitors were injured, as the park evacuated 25,000 guests. The ride later reopened in July 2020.

=== Poseidon ===
- On 31 May 2005, shortly before 12:30 p.m., the victim and a friend climbed into the back seat of an eight-seater boat on the Poseidon. The retaining brackets closed properly. After the start, the boats of the Poseidon water coaster were pulled diagonally upwards to a height of about 20 metres (66 ft). According to witnesses, the heavy man panicked, pushed against the retaining bracket with all his might, and squeezed himself under it. His companion and other passengers could not prevent him from climbing out of the slow-moving train. The 44-year-old fell into a pond overgrown with school, which is outside the generally accessible visitor area. An emergency doctor could only determine the death of the man. The passengers still in the boat and those accompanying the deceased man received psychological care as a precaution. The accident went largely unnoticed by the other park guests.

=== Revolving theater (Historama) ===
- In August 1999, a 14-year-old girl died in the revolving theater (later a part of Historama) due to a lack of security sensors.

== Flamingo Land, North Yorkshire, England ==
=== Dino Roller ===
- On 5 August 2020, a park employee was airlifted to hospital after suffering injuries to his legs while trying to repair the ride. His injuries were not considered to have been life-threatening despite having been serious.

=== Hero ===
- On 22 May 2015, a 15-year-old girl and a 26-year-old woman were injured after a footrail dislodged while in motion and landed in the queue for the ride. The 15-year-old girl was taken to Scarborough General Hospital for treatment for her head injuries, whereas the 26-year-old woman was treated at the scene. Although both sustained head injuries, North Yorkshire Police released a statement claiming that neither was life-threatening. The ride was taken out of operation in accordance with Flamingo Land's operational procedures, and underwent a full inspection in conjunction with North Yorkshire Police and the HSE. The ride has since reopened with nets above the waiting line to catch falling items, and is in full operation.

== Funland, Hayling Island, England ==
=== Klondike Gold Mine ===
- On 17 September 2015, during the coaster's dismantling as part of its sale to an Irish company, a 47-year-old Romanian workman slipped on top of the coaster structure and fell seven metres (23 ft), breaking his arm and leg. The man was treated at Queen Alexandra Hospital, Portsmouth, and his condition was described as being serious, but not life-threatening.

== Gardaland, Northern Italy ==
=== Mr. Ping's Noodle Surprise ===
- On 26 December 2016, a 6-year-old girl suffered head injuries while riding in the rotating teacups. She was hospitalized at Borgo Trento Hospital in Verona.

== Gröna Lund, Stockholm, Sweden ==
=== Jetline ===
- On 25 June 2023, a 39-year-old woman died and six others (including three children) were taken to hospital when the JetLine rollercoaster partially derailed, sending people crashing to the ground. Due to lack of maintenance and forged documents, the right arm holding the coaster to the track broke off, causing rapid shaking. Three passengers fell to the ground, and one died.

== Gray's Amusement Park, Ingoldmells, England ==
- On 2 June 2000, a 12-year-old boy died from injuries sustained at Gray's Amusement Park in Ingoldmells near Skegness. He was hit in the chest by a metal cage carrying him and his older brother on an attraction known as The Swinging Gym. In 2002, the accident was ruled an unlawful killing, and led to fines of £7000 and £10,000 for operator Elliott Gray and Robert Blake respectively.

== Gulliver's Land, Milton Keynes, England ==
=== Runaway Train ===
- On 10 May 2006, a 56-year-old park employee was performing safety checks when he hit his head on a bridge when the train was traversing through a tunnel. He suffered severe brain and skull trauma, and medical personnel believe he died instantly.

== Gulliver's World, Warrington, England ==
=== Antelope ===
- In April 2011, a 12-year-old girl from Runcorn, Cheshire suffered a spinal cord injury after riding the Antelope rollercoaster. She was paralysed from the neck down and became a wheelchair user as a result. Her family sued Gulliver's World; its legal representatives believe she suffered whiplash and the G-Forces of the ride were significant enough to force a passenger's head back and forth. Gulliver's World dispute this, and state that they cannot find a link between her injuries and the rollercoaster.

=== Crazy Train ===
- On 17 September 2018, the Crazy Train had a near-accident incident, due to the safety features, the coaster stopped. 21 people, including children, were trapped approximately 15 m (50 ft) above the ground for up to two hours. Witnesses say they saw a large object fly off the coaster.

=== Ferris Wheel ===
- On 13 July 2002, a 15-year-old girl with Down syndrome fell 9 m (30 ft) from a Ferris wheel, after her mother was not allowed to ride with her. The teenager was taken to hospital, but died two days later from head injuries. The park was fined a total of £80,000 for failing to ensure a person's safety, and not carrying out risk assessments.

== Guillena Zoo, near Seville, Spain ==
=== Flying Swinger ===
- On 9 April 2005, 18 people, including 15 children, were injured when a Flying Swinger ride collapsed at Guillena Zoo near Seville, Spain. Four were seriously injured, including an 11-year-old girl and a woman, who were airlifted to a hospital in Seville with serious head and leg injuries. Witnesses said that the attraction's main support snapped in two, trapping victims under the debris. The ride, built in 2001, had just passed all of its required safety inspections.

== Landmark Forest Adventure Park, Carrbridge, Scotland ==
=== Runaway Timber Train ===
- On 12 August 2021, two children sustained minor injuries after two carriages on the Runaway Timber Train rollercoaster derailed.

== Lightwater Valley, North Yorkshire, England ==
=== Black Pearl ===
- On 14 July 2016, a 55-year-old man nearly fell 26 m (85 ft) from his seat off the ride after his safety restraints were unlocked. His carer rescued him by grabbing his wrists.

=== The Twister ===
- On 21 June 2001, 20-year-old woman Gemma Savage died following an accident the previous day when two carriages on the Twister roller coaster collided. Police decided not to prosecute a maintenance worker, who claimed he received only an hour's training on that ride and had not seen its manual. Faulty wiring had also caused a malfunction on the ride. In October 2004, the deputy coroner ruled death by misadventure. On 14 November 2006, the park was charged with failing to ensure the health and safety of riders, and the ride operator with failing to ensure safety through his work. Both pleaded guilty. The ride manufacturer, Reverchon Industries SA, was convicted of two charges of failing to ensure the ride's safe design and construction.
- On 30 May 2019, a 6-year-old boy fell from a ride carriage and suffered head injuries. The child was later airlifted to Leeds General Infirmary and fully recovered.

=== The Ultimate ===
- On 28 September 2014, a deer was killed instantly after being hit by an ongoing coaster train. Passengers were covered in blood, but no one suffered any serious injuries. The ride was closed for 30 minutes then it reopened to normal operation. A similar incident occurred in June 1994, 20 years prior, as another deer was decapitated by the roller coaster when it stumbled onto the tracks which injured a 12-year-old boy who was taken to a nearby hospital for treatment.

== Liseberg, Gothenburg, Sweden ==
=== Flumeride ===
- On 8 October 2006, a woman in her thirties was seriously injured on the Flumeride log boat ride. At the second and final drop, a 14 m (46 ft) slope, the woman apparently panicked, and tried to keep the log boat from travelling down the slope by holding the railings. She was ejected from the boat into the water and slid down the slope. Since she had managed to temporarily keep her log boat from dropping down the slope, the next two log boats passed the last safety gate along with it, slid down the slope, and at least one of them struck her in the head. The event was witnessed by staff who stopped the ride but could not prevent the latter two boats from continuing. The woman, travelling with her 11-year-old daughter and another woman, was taken to Sahlgrenska University Hospital, where she was reported to be in critical but stable condition. An investigation was initiated by the authorities, and Liseberg also initiated an internal inquiry. She eventually recovered fully.

=== Lisebergbanan ===
- On 15 July 2006, 21 people were injured when two trains on the Lisebergbanan rollercoaster collided. The crash happened when the chain that pulls trains up the initial climb malfunctioned, causing a fully loaded train to roll backward into the loading platform, hitting another train unloading riders. Since only part of the train was on the lift, the anti-rollback mechanism had not fully engaged and broke. The steel roller coaster was built in 1987 and is one of Sweden's largest, reaching speeds up to 80 km/h (50 mph). Since the accident the roller coaster has opened again, after a technical adjustment, and is in full operation.

=== Oceana Waterpark ===
- On 12 February 2024, a massive fire broke out at the Oceana waterpark that was still under construction. The fire produced three explosions and caused the evacuation of a nearby hotel and office facilities. The waterpark was totally destroyed by the fire and nothing was salvageable. A body was found after the fire, later identified as Patrik Gillholm who worked at the park. The park later decided to reconstruct the waterpark, planning to open in 2026.

=== Rainbow ===
- On 15 July 2008, 30 people were injured when the ride collapsed. The park manager stated that he believes a ball bearing on the ride failed. The ride was dismantled on 17 July 2008. Investigators then confirmed on 19 July 2008 that they had discovered a faulty drive shaft during their inspection. They believed that one of the axles that is designed to hold the passenger carriage horizontal failed. The drive shaft had been replaced by Huss Maschinefabrik, the ride's manufacturer, in 2003.

== Loudoun Castle, Ayrshire, Scotland ==
=== Rat ===
- On 16 July 2007, 18-year-old park worker Mark Blackwood died after falling 24 m (80 ft) from the Rat ride at the Scottish park. During his first day on the job on 15 July 2007, it is believed he saw a carriage stuck on the ride. He climbed up to attempt to fix the ride; however when it started to move he was dragged to the highest point, when he lost his grip and fell. The park voluntarily closed the ride even after it passed inspection.

== Luna Park, St Brieuc, France ==
- On 10 August 2015, a woman broke her leg after one of the bungee lines snapped on a slingshot-style bungee ride, causing the carriage to hit one of the supporting poles.

== M&D's, Motherwell, Scotland ==
=== Tsunami ===
- On 4 July 2011, nine people, ranging in age from 9 to 49, had to be rescued from the Tsunami roller coaster, after a mechanical failure on the ride left them stranded 18 m (60 ft) above the ground for up to eight hours.
- On 26 June 2016, the roller coaster derailed, falling into the crowd below, injuring seven children and two adults. On the way down, it hit the main structure and came to rest on a nearby children's ride. Ten park guests were taken to local hospitals for treatment. The park was evacuated following the incident. The ride was permanently closed following the incident and was removed in February 2017, eight months later.

=== White Water Log Flume ===
- Around 2013, there was an incident on the White Water Log Flume in which a woman's leg was trapped between a barrier and a splashback on the ride's structure, causing a serious injury.
- In August 2015, three people were injured when the White Water Log Flume slipped on its track, and later the same month a 58-year-old woman and three teenagers had to walk down from the top of the ride after it stuck at the highest point.

== Mirabilandia, Ravenna, Italy ==
=== Katun ===
- On 28 September 2007, a man was killed at the Mirabilandia theme park in Ravenna, Italy, when he was hit in the head by the leg of a female rider on the Katun inverted coaster. The girl whose leg struck the man was injured. The man was in a restricted area when he was struck, however the ride was still closed so officials could investigate.

== Naudières, Sautron, France ==
=== Roller Coaster ===
- On 13 August 2011, a 24-year-old ride operator was crushed by two trains at the Naudières theme park in Sautron, France. The operator left the control booth of the ride while it was in motion. He slipped, trapping his legs beneath the track and then was hit by a train, trapping him between two cars, crushing him beneath the ride's structure. Doctors amputated his legs at the scene, but he later died of his injuries. The park closed the next day due to 'very bad weather'.

== Nigloland, Dolancourt, France ==
=== Bat Coaster ===
- On 4 April 2005, the former golf coaster was stopped by a guest. A technician returned the ride to operation, but it collided with the technician's machine, hurting several riders' legs, one seriously.

== Oakwood Theme Park, Pembrokeshire, Wales ==
=== Drenched (Hydro) ===
- On 15 April 2004, 16-year-old Hayley Williams from Pontypool, Monmouthshire, was killed after falling approximately 30 m (98 ft) from the top of the Hydro (now called Drenched) ride. Ten-year-old Martin Rothwell also fell out but suffered only slight head injuries. Witnesses said the boy had got into difficulties and Hayley tried to help him, before both tumbled over the edge. During the Coroner's inquest, the jury returned a narrative verdict stating that the victim died due to not being properly restrained. In February 2008, Oakwood was charged by the HSE for park staff not ensuring that guests were properly and safely restrained. On 22 May 2008, magistrates in Haverfordwest magistrates' court rejected Oakwood Leisure Limited's request for an adjournment and directed that the hearing proceed on the assumption of a not guilty plea. The magistrates declined jurisdiction and adjourned the case which was committed for crown court trial in Swansea Crown Court on 7 July 2008. The magistrates' court was limited to fining the company £20,000, the crown court can impose an unlimited fine. On 8 July 2008, Oakwood pleaded guilty under the Health and Safety Act 1974 for failing to conduct its business such to ensure that its guests were not exposed to risks. In December 2008 the company was fined £250,000 plus £80,000 in costs.

=== Treetops ===
- On 23 October 2022, a man suffered serious injuries after being thrown off from one of the carriages which was reported to have become loose during mid-ride. A teenage girl was also injured and both victims were taken to the hospital. Following the incident, the park remained temporarily closed before reopening a week later.

== Parc Astérix, Plaily, France ==
=== La Descente du Styx ===
- On 5 July 2006, a 6-year-old Belgian boy drowned as he was dragged underwater by the current. The boy was with a group of friends and supervisors in a boat propelled by rapids, waterfalls and geysers. It is alleged that the boy stood up too early as the boat reached the end point. Another boat collided with the boy's boat, knocking him into the water. Two people dived in after the boy, but he had disappeared in the artificial waves of the attraction. When he was found 20 minutes later, resuscitation efforts were of no avail.

== Parc Saint-Paul, Saint Paul, France ==
=== Formule 1 ===
- On 15 July 2005, a brake failure on the then brand-new coaster caused an incoming train to crash into several others on the brake run, slightly injuring 11 riders.
- On 22 August 2009, a 35-year-old woman was thrown from the ride on a hairpin turn, approximately 10 metres (33 ft) above ground. She died of cardiac arrest some 10 minutes later. An investigation reported that the woman had not followed safety procedures, and thus her death was not declared as a direct result of the park. The coaster reopened some time later.
- On 4 July 2020, around 1:45 PM, a 32-year-old woman was ejected from the car mid-ride, and was pronounced dead at the scene. Following an investigation, it was determined that park owner Gilles Campion had deemed the ride's seatbelts unnecessary after the ride passed its November 2019 safety inspection, and subsequently had them removed from the ride vehicles.

=== Looping ===
- On 17 August 2005, the front car derailed mid-ride, seriously injuring four riders and placing one of them in a coma. The coaster was removed immediately and placed in storage for several years. In 2007, three of the four victims received €6,000 in expenses, and after a lengthy court battle, park owner Gilles Campion was given a suspended four-month prison sentence and ordered to pay for all damages.

== Parko Paliatso, Ayia Napa, Republic of Cyprus ==
=== Star Flyer ===
- On Friday, 12 April 2019, a 7-year-old boy and his 44-year-old mother from Russia were riding the Star Flyer, when their swing collided with a nearby ride seriously injuring both. The boy suffered an exposed fracture on his right leg, while his mother lacerated her left knee, broke her right hand and suffered a concussion. The ride was removed from the park shortly after and now is a part of the travelling circuit with Abie Danter in the UK.

== Parque de Atracciones de Madrid, Madrid, Spain ==
=== Tren de la Mina ===
- On 16 July 2017, 33 people were injured when two trains collided. One failed to stop after finishing its run and hit another which was just about to leave the station. 27 people were taken to the hospital suffering minor injuries. Paramedics said that six children under the age of 10 were injured in the accident. An emergency service spokesperson said that no injuries were considered serious and the guests were all treated for neck, back and stomach pains.

== Paultons Park, Hampshire, England ==
=== Velociraptor ===
- On 26 May 2016, 15 passengers were evacuated from the ride after being stuck 14 m (45 ft) in the air for 40 minutes when it broke down during the morning hours of operation. No injuries were reported.

== Phantasialand, Brühl, Germany ==
=== 2001 Fire ===
- On 1 May 2001, a fire broke out at the park, injuring 54 people; no one was seriously hurt. The fire began on the powered roller coaster Grand Canyon Achterbahn, located inside the structure of the bigger roller coaster Gebirgsbahn, on a day the park had 20,000 visitors. The park's founder said a cable fire was most likely the cause of the blaze. There were 150 passengers on the two rides at the time. Some Gebirgsbahn passengers could only exit the cars using a 18 m (60 ft) ladder. The mostly polystyrene facade was coated with a fire-resistant film; however, it had lost its effect after years of operation and caught fire. The two roller coasters and the nearby Tanagra Theater were completely destroyed and demolished shortly after. Following this accident, the park improved the safety standards on many attractions. This resulted in some compromises. Some of the effects on the park's rides had to be removed, the upper floor of the IMAX simulator Galaxy (later: Race for Atlantis) was permanently closed and the track of the Gondelbahn 1001-Nacht dark ride was shortened to make room for a rescue passage for firetrucks. The park also installed new sprinkler systems in some of the rides like the Silbermine dark ride. Today the rapid river River Quest is located on the site of the two roller coasters. The Tanagra Theater was replaced with the Vekoma Mad House Feng Ju Palace.

=== Black Mamba ===
- On 14 May 2011, a 48-year-old man died while riding the inverted roller coaster Black Mamba. According to German safety inspectors, the roller coaster and all safety features were sound and passed extensive testing by the TÜV. Autopsy showed that the death was caused by a heart attack.

=== Taron ===
- On 25 March 2024, a 43-year-old maintenance worker was killed on Taron during pre-season maintenance work.

=== Winja's Fear & Force ===
- On 14 March 2017, a 58-year-old employee fractured his neck while performing maintenance on the ride. He later died from his injuries.

== Planet Fun, Carrickfergus Castle, Northern Ireland ==
=== Star Flyer ===
- On Saturday 24 July 2021, six people were injured on a ride at a travelling fun fair called Planet Fun, located at Carrickfergus Castle, Northern Ireland at the time. The malfunctioning ride, called ‘Star Flyer,’ spins its occupants in circles as it rises up to 40 ft in the air. The ride swung beyond its perimeter and struck a number of signs belonging to the structure. Six people were injured and taken to hospital, including three children. A number of people were also treated for injuries at the scene. The incident did not appear to cause any life-threatening injuries. After an investigation by the HSE, it was found that there was "misuse" of equipment by "several teenagers".

== Pleasureland, Southport. Merseyside, England ==
=== Sky Ride ===
- On 25 August 2004, a 59-year-old employee was killed after he became trapped. The park was fined £95,000 for breaching health and safety laws, and were also ordered to pay £50,000 in costs.

== Plopsaland Belgium, Adinkerke, Belgium ==
=== Draconis ===
- On 3 August 2006, when the ride was known as "De Draak", an 8-year-old child hit their head after crawling behind the bushes of the attraction to the dragon castle, ascending the emergency stairs unnoticed, and entering the castle. The child then arrived at the coaster's station and was approached by an incoming train. While jumping away, they hit their head badly and were later taken to a hospital in critical condition.

=== Mega Mindy Jetski ===
- On 3 April 2023, a 54-year-old woman was heavily injured on her forearm. She tried to help her 4-year-old grandson who fell into the water after the attraction was started too early. She fell out herself and got hit by a gondola. She was taken to a hospital.

== Plopsaland Deutschland, Haßloch, Germany ==
=== Spinning Barrels ===
- On 15 August 2014, an 11-year-old girl was killed after being run over and crushed by several gondolas on a Huss Breakdance ride. The girl and her mother entered the ride via an unlocked door. An employee did not notice the girl was not inside a gondola and turned on the ride. The girl tripped and fell. An employee of the park was sentenced to a fine of €2,400 for negligent homicide. After the incident, the ride was closed and sold.

== PortAventura World, Catalonia, Spain ==
=== PortAventura Park ===
==== Stampida ====
- On 6 July 1997, a 32-year-old man died after being ejected from a train. The accident occurred on the right-hand turn following the ride's first drop, where the train reached approximately 72 km/h (44 mph). Later safety reports found that the fixed lap restraint system used on Stampida could fail to adequately secure passengers whose body size prevented the restraint bar from fitting properly. These findings led to the temporary closure of both Stampida, and it's sister rollercoaster, Tomahawk, while new safety restraint mechanisms were implemented on all their trains.

==== Tomahawk ====
- On 18 May 2009, a 55-year-old park employee died after being run over by a roller coaster train as he was performing maintenance.
- On 11 February 2024, 14 people were injured after colliding with a tree that had fallen on the tracks due to strong winds.

==== Silver River Flume ====
- On 14 September 2018, a 19-year-old man was injured after falling while in line to ride the log flume. He suffered a traumatic cranioencephalic injury and fractured his arms and legs. He was taken to a local hospital for treatment and recovered.

== Prater, Vienna, Austria ==
=== Extasy ===
- On 5 April 2010, a 34-year-old Viennese man died after trying to jump onto a high-speed carousel ride at Vienna's Prater amusement park. He was drunk and attempting to get back on the ride during its operation by hurling himself at the spinning carousel.
- On 31 October 2018 around 10 p.m. a girl fell out of the spinning gondola of the ride, resulting in an injured ankle and a bruised armpit. It is said that she had a backpack that blocked the full closure of the safety bar

=== Olympia Looping ===
- In the evening of 29 March 2022, a 30-year-old female employee crossed the track in a closed-off area of the ride and was hit by a roller coaster car. The coaster, which is a part of the travelling circuit and is present at London's Hyde Park's Winter Wonderland, is the world's largest transportable coaster. First aid measures were not successful and the employee died on site.

=== Volare ===
- On 22 October 2010, three people were injured on the Volare roller coaster when a crane crashed against the ride. The 'wagon' steered into the crane's hoist, set close to the ride. A 21-year-old Macedonian man sustained serious head injuries when he fell 8 m (26 ft) to the ground from the platform supported by the crane. One tourist sustained a broken arm while her friend suffered cuts and bruises. The official accident report says the employee operating the roller coaster was unaware the worker was busy on the scaffolding when he started the ride. Newspapers, however, report that the attraction has been in operation many times while the painters were busy.
- On 7 August 2017 shortly before 5 p.m., a 26-year-old male roller coaster employee from Iraq entered a closed-off area of the ride and was hit by a 'wagon' from the back, suffering severe head injuries. He was transported to a hospital by helicopter, where he died during the following night.

== Rotunda Amusement Park, Kent, England ==
=== Mini-Dragon ===
- On 11 September 1999, 8-year-old girl Erin Griffin died after falling from the coaster and hitting her head on a steel support. In July 2002, Erin's father David took his own life, believed to be due to his grief as a result of the accident. On 19 February 2003, Dreamland Leisure denied the charge but was found guilty of negligence in ensuring guest safety. The company was fined £25,000 and ordered to pay £140,000 in costs and £15,000 in compensation to the victim's mother.

== Terra Mítica, Benidorm, Spain ==
=== Inferno ===
- On 7 July 2014, a 18-year-old Icelandic man named Andri Freyr Sveinsson was killed after his harness sprung open on Inferno, a ZacSpin coaster at the park. All other ZacSpins across the world - Green Lantern: First Flight, Insane and Kirnu at Six Flags Magic Mountain, Gröna Lund and Linnanmäki respectively - ceased operations pending investigation findings from Terra Mítica and later reopened. It was found that the park modified the restraints on the ride without the knowledge of Intamin, the ride's manufacturer and the other three rides were reopened.

== Thorpe Park, Surrey, England ==
=== Loggers Leap ===
- In April 2014, a 14-year-old girl from Colchester was injured by the safety bar. In a subsequent claim against the park's insurers, she was awarded £20,000 for nerve damage, a swollen knee joint, long-term hypersensitivity, and soft tissue damage. The claim stated that the ride attendants put too many guests in the ride vehicle, which forced the victim's legs into the safety barrier. The ride closed permanently in 2015.

=== Other incidents ===
- At about 3:00 pm on 21 July 2000, a fire broke out in the Ranger County area of the park at Mr. Rabbit's Tropical Travel, quickly spreading to Wicked Witches Haunt. Wicked Witches Haunt was removed and the indoor section of Mr. Rabbit's Tropical Travels was destroyed. No one was injured. The cause of the fire is unknown, but sources say it started from a discarded lit cigarette.
- On 18 July 2020, a 26-year-old man suffered a stab wound to his stomach following an altercation on a bridge near the park entrance; this caused the park to be briefly put in lockdown. Craig Harakh, 26, was initially charged with causing grievous bodily harm with intent, but later these charges were dropped. He was jailed for seven months for affray. The victim was discharged from the hospital shortly after the incident.

=== Rumba Rapids ===
- In the ride's opening year of 1987, a 7-year-old boy was thrown from a boat and lost an ear. The news was broken by children's BBC TV news programme, Newsround.

=== X: No Way Out (now The Walking Dead: The Ride) ===
- On 31 August 2000, an 11-year-old boy sustained lacerations to both shins and a minor head injury on the ride caused by falling out of the car. The ride has operated as The Walking Dead: The Ride since 2018.

=== Zodiac ===
- On 22 September 2001, two teenagers sustained minor injuries when one support on a gondola broke on Zodiac; a HUSS Enterprise flat ride. The gondola repeatedly hit the decking at the bottom of the ride while the operator attempted to stop the ride. The incident was taken to court, where the judge criticised the length of time it took to shut down the ride after an abnormal noise was noticed. Tussauds Group was fined £65,000 and ordered to pay an additional £35,000 in costs for failing to ensure the safety of persons not in its employment.

== Tibidabo Amusement Park, Barcelona, Spain ==
=== El Pèndulo ===
- On 10 July 2010, a 15-year-old girl died and three other teenagers were injured when the mechanical arm of the El Pèndulo broke and the basket carrying the four teens fell onto a nearby ride.

== Tivoli Friheden, Aarhus, Denmark ==
=== Cobra ===
- On 4 July 2008, four unidentified people were injured while riding the Cobra coaster. The ride vehicle broke in two, with the front part of the train falling to the ground. The ride was not operated between 2008 and 2009.
- On 14 July 2022, two people were injured and a 14-year-old girl died while riding the Cobra coaster. The rear carriage disconnected for an unknown reason causing fatal and serious injuries.

== Toverland, Sevenum, Netherlands ==
=== Djengu River ===
- On 23 July 2014, four people suffered back injuries and had to be taken to hospital after a boat defect caused their boat to take on too much water. The boat then became too heavy, resulting in a very bumpy ride.

=== Expedition Zork ===
- On 8 May 2005, five people were injured when a boat carrying six people gained too much speed on a downhill bend and the boat's stern was lifted, causing the log with its passengers to land outside the track. The ride was immediately closed. One victim is still in a wheelchair as of 2014.

=== Tolly Molly ===
- On 14 June 2022, a 5-year-old boy was injured after stepping out of the moving attraction and falling into the water surrounding it. The ride was immediately stopped by an employee.

=== Toos-Express ===
- On 26 April 2023, a 38-year-old woman fell 2.5 m (8.2 ft) and broke her back due to a misstep when wanting to ride the kiddie coaster Toos-Express. The park's staff rushed to help and made sure she wouldn't move until she was taken to a hospital.

=== Troy ===
- During construction on 5 March 2007, part of Troy's unfinished lift hill structure collapsed due to strong winds. No injuries were reported as a result of the collapse.
- On 9 December 2024, an employee fell approximately 7 m (23 ft) while performing maintenance work at the wooden roller coaster Troy and suffered a broken elbow.

== Tramore Amusement Park, Tramore, Ireland ==
=== Ghost Train ===
- On 26 August 2006, a 22-year-old man died in an accident after he stood up in the ghost train car, fell out over the side, and broke his neck against the wall.

=== The Ejection Seat ===
- On 4 August 2002, a 16-year-old male park employee was struck and killed by this slingshot ride while it was in operation.

== Walibi Belgium, Wavre, Belgium ==
=== Turbine ===
- On 27 August 1997, when the ride was known as Sirroco, a coaster train launched at incorrect speed. The train entered the loop very slowly and up the spike, to roll backwards. During the backwards passage of the loop, the train halted at the uppermost point and became stuck hanging upside-down. The passengers were hanging heads-down for one hour and twenty minutes, only held in place with lap bar restraints. The train was pulled back further down the track with help of the local fire station brigade.

== Walibi Holland, Biddinghuizen, Netherlands ==
=== Condor ===
- On 5 July 1994, 15 riders suffered injuries when one of the trains collided into the other parked at the station. 6 of the 40 passengers that were on board the ride were taken to a nearby hospital while others were treated at the park.

=== El Rio Grande ===
- On 24 July 2013, a 10-year-old girl was seriously injured when her foot got stuck on one of the boats. It was later reported by the police that once they rescued her, one of her feet was missing. The girl was taken to a nearby hospital and had her foot amputated. After the incident, many signs were put on the ride to ensure the safety of all guests.

=== Goliath ===
- On 31 October 2009, a 16-year-old girl was struck by a steel pipe that fell from a height of 3 m (9.8 ft). She suffered a concussion and was taken to hospital.

=== Red Bull Kart Fight Exhibition Track ===
- On 5 May 2018, a 13-year-old girl was severely injured in a karting incident. Some skin on her head was torn off after her hair was caught in the kart's engine through an opening behind the seat. Walibi Holland was prosecuted for possible negligence on two points: the kart was missing a part guarding the drive belt, and the ride operators might have ignored safety instructions. The park was found not guilty because there was not enough evidence that the missing guard contributed to the accident, nor that there had been too few instructions on the part of the operators. Eyewitnesses also confirmed the hair was tied in a knot when the girl left the station. The kart manufacturer criticized the absence of a helmet requirement which is in place for karting tracks but not amusement parks. As of February 2021, she still had physical and psychological problems from the accident.

== Wheelgate Park, Nottinghamshire, England ==
- On 16 April 2016, a 3-year-old boy fell unconscious while at the park with his parents. Paramedics tried to revive him, but he was pronounced dead at the hospital. It was stated that the boy was not on a ride and had a health condition at the time.

=== Astroslide ===
- On 5 September 2004, a seven-year-old girl died after sustaining severe head injuries after tripping over her mat while exiting the ride.

=== Mirror Maze ===
- In 2016, nine-year-old Olivia Ward suffered severe lacerations and deep cuts to her legs when a mirror shattered while she was navigating the attraction. Olivia needed around 20 stitches and had to use crutches to move around while healing, and will have scars for life as a result of the incident.

== Wicksteed Park, Northamptonshire, England ==
=== Wicksteed Park Railway ===
- On 7 September 2003, passengers were thrown into the air as their carriage derailed when the train halted. Two people were taken to hospital with leg and back injuries.

== Wild- und Freizeitpark Klotten, Germany ==
=== Klotti-Achterbahn ===
- On 6 August 2022 an unidentified 57-year-old woman fell 8 m (26 ft) from the moving roller coaster and died on the scene. The cause of the accident is currently being investigated. The district of Cochem-Zell prohibited the operation of the roller coaster until a safety check has been performed.

== Wunderland Kalkar, Kalkar, Germany ==
=== Flying Elephant ===
- In 2005, an 8-year-old boy broke both of his forearms after falling out of the ride.
- On 7 July 2009, a 9-year-old girl broke her left thigh and her right ankle after she fell out of the ride.

=== Kartbahn ===
- On 21 April 2023, a 30-year-old woman was heavily injured after her clothes got caught on the rear axle of her kart, causing her to be ejected out of the vehicle.

== See also ==
- United States amusement park accidents
