= Amusement park accident =

Amusement park accident may refer to:

- United States amusement park accidents
- Incidents at European amusement parks
