= China Dinosaurs Park =

Theme park in Changzhou, China

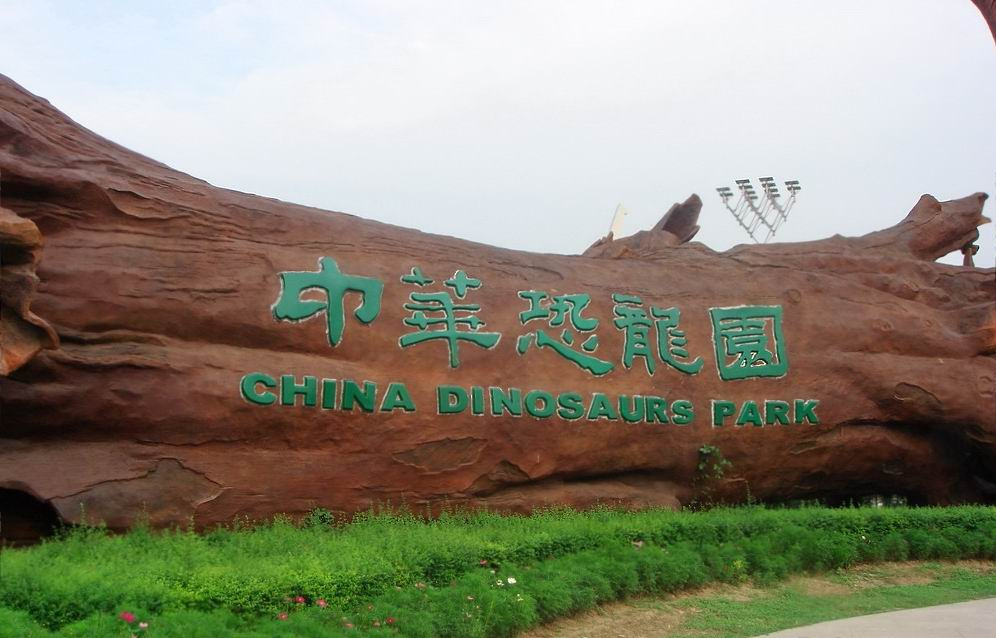
- Interactive map of China Dinosaurs Park
- Location: Changzhou, Jiangsu, China
- Coordinates: 31°49′34.2″N 119°59′51.4″E
- Status: Operating
- Opened: September 2000
- Theme: Dinosaurs
- Area: 600 mu (0.27 km^{2})

Attractions
- Total: 22
- Roller coasters: 3
- Water rides: 3
- Website: Official website

China Dinosaurs Park (Chinese: 中华恐龙园), also called China Dinosaurs Land is a theme park located in Changzhou, Jiangsu, China. It has been open since September 2000. The park covers more than 600 mu (0.27 km^{2}). As it is a theme park about dinosaurs, it is also called the "Eastern Jurassic Park". The museum contains a nearly complete fossil skeleton of the important dinosaur genus Sinosauropteryx (similar to Archaeopteryx) as well as large fossils such as those of a Brachiosaurus and a Hadrosaurus.

Changzhou Travel and Tourism Administration regards China Dinosaur Park as the most amusing base for science education. The park focuses on creating a harmonious ecological environment. There are 70 different kinds of trees and more than 4,000 plants in the park. The afforested areas comprise 70 percent of the total area. There are nearly twenty kinds of amusements for tourists to enjoy themselves.

The symbolic building in the park is the museum of dinosaurs. The museum covers about 20,000 square meters, and contains more than ten halls, including "Evolution Hall" and "Woods Hall". The first floor of the museum is taken up by the skeleton of a dinosaur. You can also see many kinds of fossils of dinosaurs in the museum. In addition, there are a lot of amusing high-fidelity game facilities. All the games are related to dinosaurs, such as "Pterodactyl's movement" and "Hot dance of the dinosaur car". Another attractive place in the park is the hot spring pool. Every year there is a big festival in the park called International Lantern Festival. During this festival, there are many fireworks and beautiful lanterns in the park. If there is any festival approaching, Changzhou China Dinosaur Park will also present a big parade in which many people dressed in cartoon costumes dance and sing together. The parade sometimes shows classic scenes from cartoon films or computer games, such as 'Baby Dinosaur'.

== Dinosaur Valley Hot Springs ==
The Dino-Valley Hot Springs was built in 2008 with an area of 280 mu (0.19 km^{2}). It is also a part of the Dinosaur Park system. It upholds the concepts of being natural, healthy, fashion, and romantic in principle. The whole project includes a hot springs theme park, lodging center, conference center, luxury dining service, and SPA. It is evaluated as a "5A" scenic area and a member of the Executive Council Unit by China Tourist Association.

The whole project consists of nearly forty pools, including some interesting ones such as Red Wine Pool, Fish Pool, and Chinese Medicine Pool.

== Dino Water Town ==
Open since 2014 with an area of 137 thousand square meters. It is the world's only dinosaur theme park for both business and travel use. It is a comprehensive place which includes shopping, dining, entertainment, lodging. Dino Water Town is the first commercial entertainment park in Changzhou which its concepts of "convenience, open, joy" in principle. Dino Water Town is different from traditional pedestrian street which combines shopping and amusement all together with dinosaurs as its theme. People from various places coming to this scenic place, including local residents in Changzhou. It has become the new "City Living Room" and the most popular, cultural, and fashion entertainment center in Changzhou.

=== Attractions ===
- Outlets: various brands for shopping
- Entertainment: CGV Theatre, Museum,
- Bar Street
- Theme Hotel
- Sightseeing Tower
- 3D Light Show and music fountain

== Attractions ==
=== Roller coasters ===
Name	Type	Manufacturer	Year opened	Image
Dinoconda	4th dimension roller coaster	S&S Worldwide	2012	
Dinosaur Mountain	Motorbike roller coaster	Zamperla	2010	
Whirling Dinosaur Car	Spinning Wild Mouse roller coaster	Golden Horse Amusement Equipment		

=== Aquatic attractions ===
Name	Type	Manufacturer	Year opened
Crossing Jurassic	Log flume dark ride		
Mega Tsunami	Shoot the Chute	Intamin	2011
Hot Sprints	Springs		
Aquatic World			

=== Other attractions ===
Name	Type	Manufacturer	Year opened	Image
Unknown name	Energy Storm	Zamperla		
4D Effect Theater	4D film		2010	
5D Interactive Theater	Desperados	Alterface		
Bump Car	Bumper cars	Zamperla	2014	
Coaster Brontosaurus	Disk'O	Zamperla	2006	
Fantastic Spooky House	Haunted house		2010	
Fire and Water Power	Top Spin	Zamperla	2010	
Fire Dragon Revelry	Frisbee	Zamperla	2006	
Fly Chaser	Giant Sky Chaser	Zamperla	2010	
Holy Dragon Pagoda	Tower	Heege	2010	
Jet Tower	Drop tower	S&S Worldwide	2010	
King Kong	King Kong	Huss Rides	2010	
PaniClock	Kamikaze (ride)	Intamin		
Punk Fly Wheel	Ferris wheel	Zamperla	2014	
Samba Balloons	Balloon Race	Zamperla		
Super Swing	Swing ride			

== Gallery ==
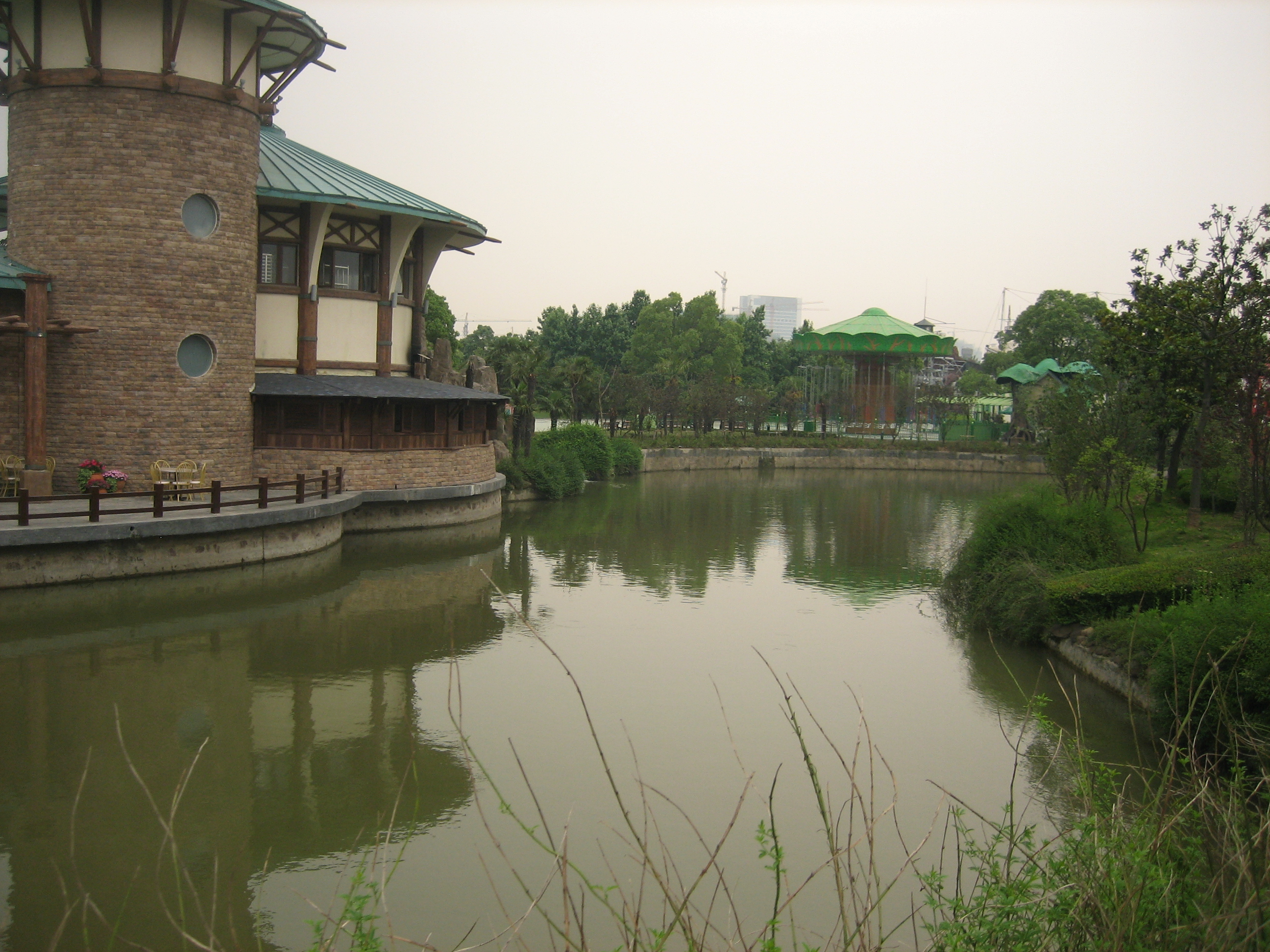

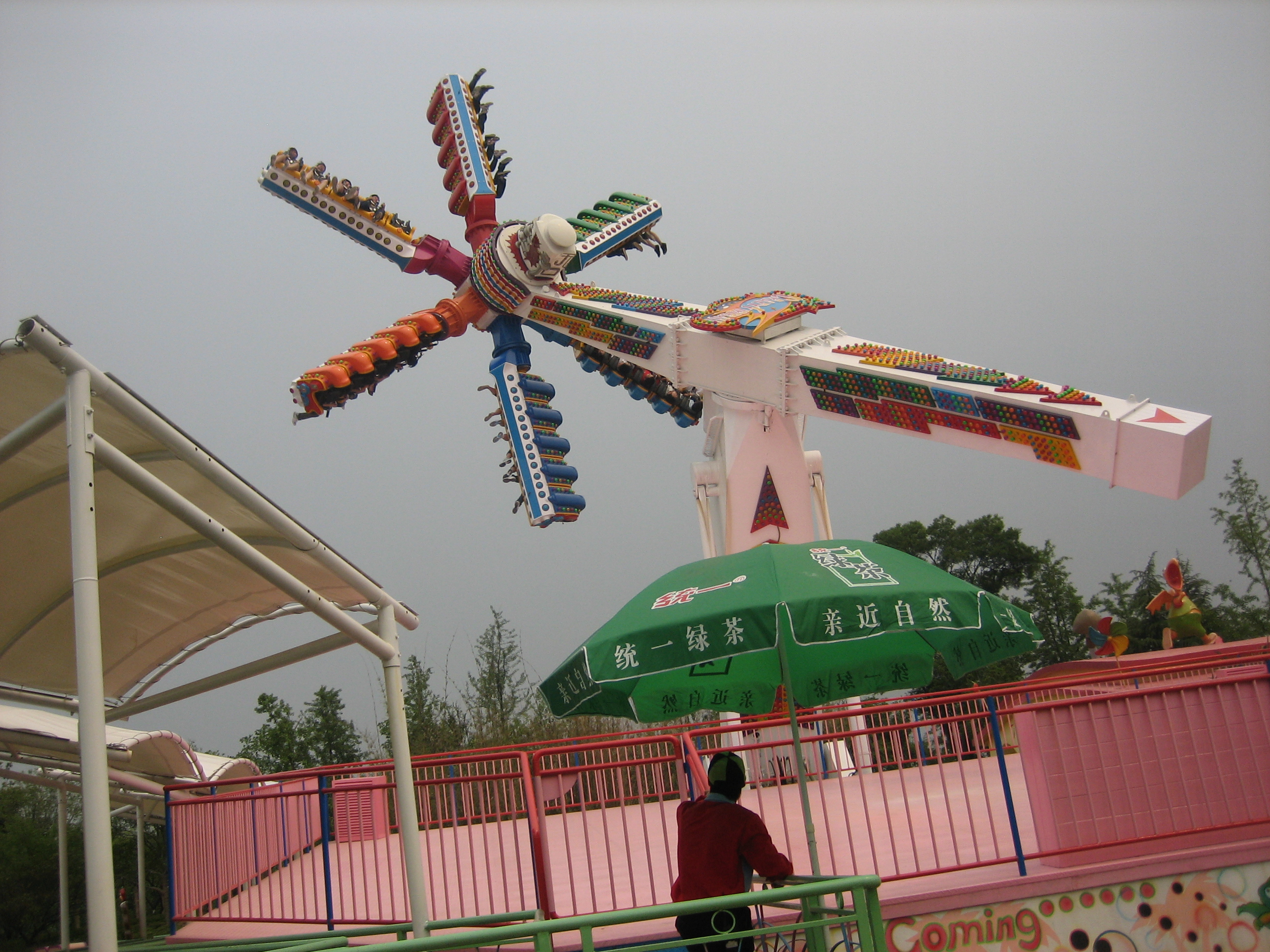
Florid Windmill

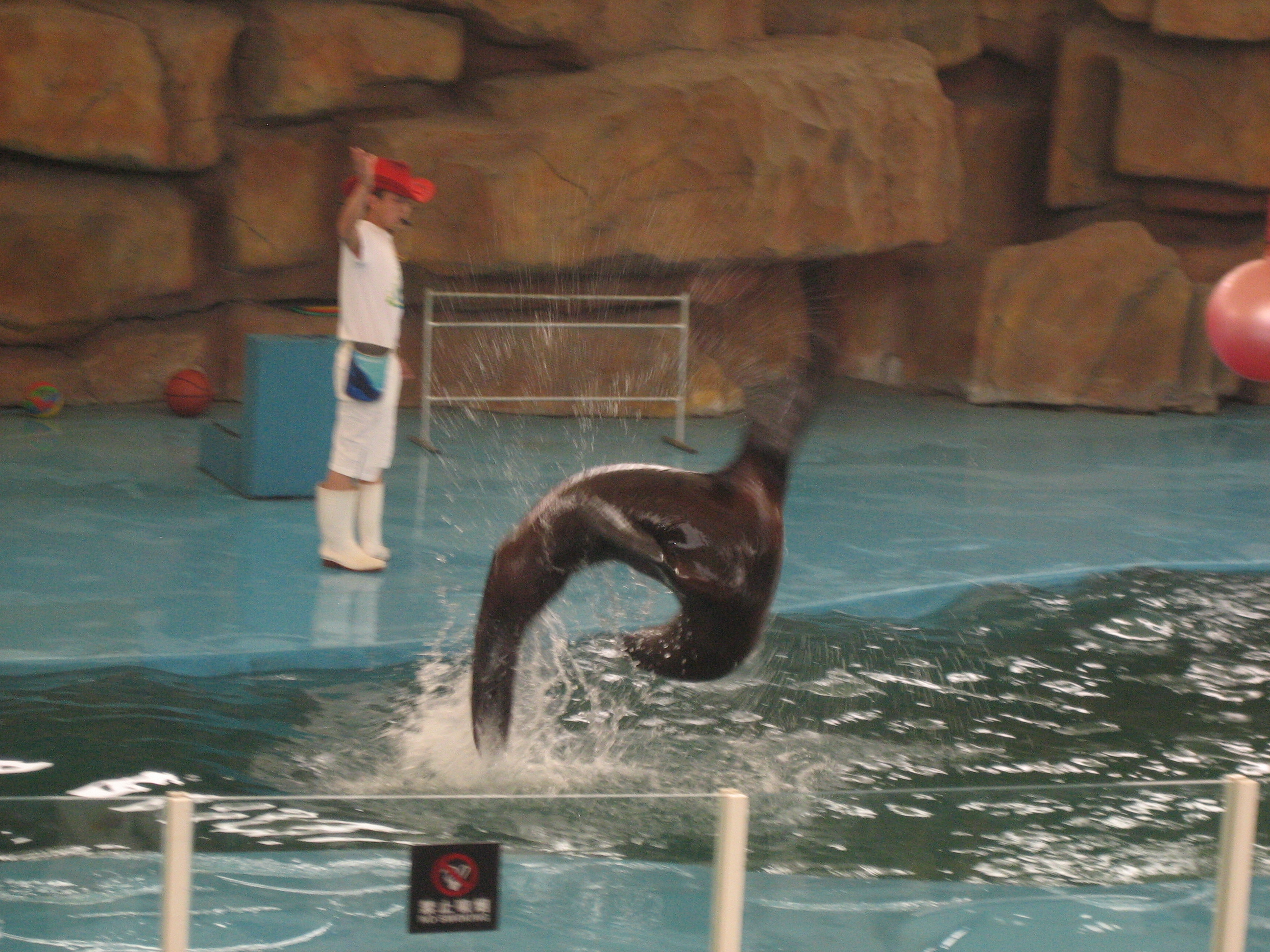

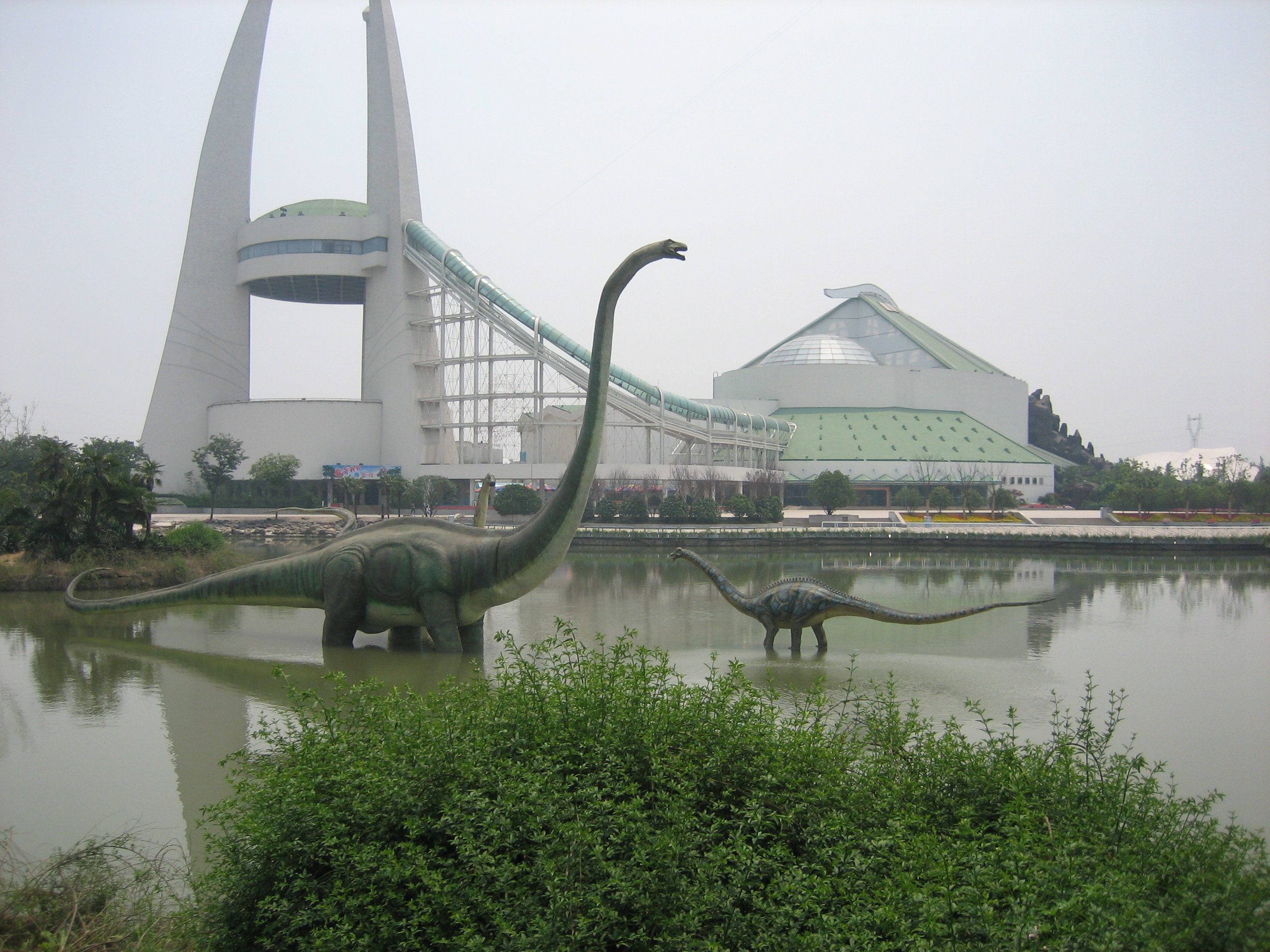
The lake

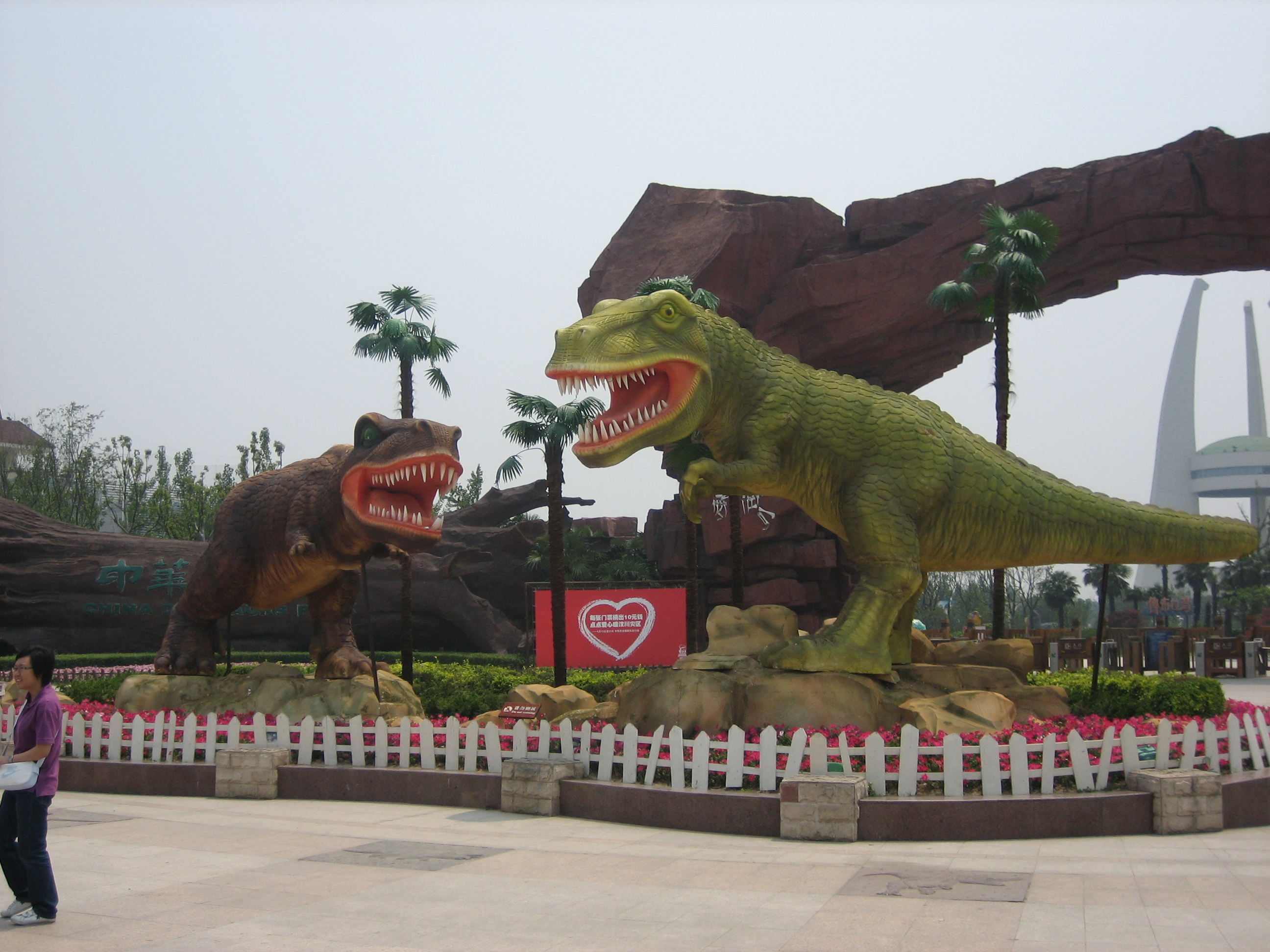
Entrance
