= Kirnu =

Roller coaster in Helsinki, Finland

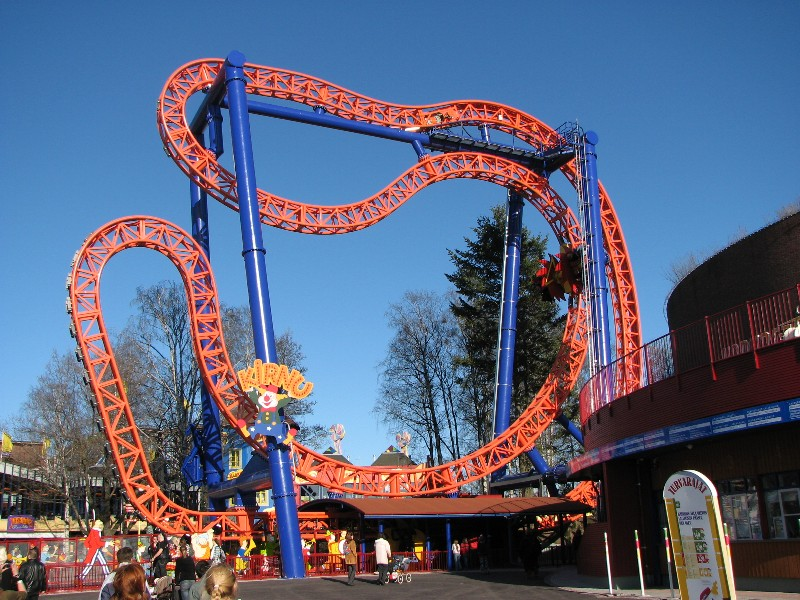

Linnanmäki
- Location: Linnanmäki
- Coordinates: 60°11′18″N 24°56′24″E
- Status: Operating
- Opening date: 27 April 2007
- Cost: About 3 million euros.

General statistics
- Type: Steel – Fourth-dimension
- Manufacturer: Intamin
- Designer: Werner Stengel
- Model: ZacSpin
- Height: 83.4 ft (25.4 m)
- Length: 465.11 ft (141.77 m)
- Speed: 37 mph (60 km/h)
- Inversions: 0
- Duration: 1:00
- Capacity: 640 riders per hour
- G-force: 2.6
- Height restriction: 55 in (140 cm)
- Trains: 3 trains with a single car; riders arranged 4 across in 2 rows for a total of 8 riders per train
- Kirnu at RCDB

Kirnu (lit. 'Churn') is a steel roller coaster located at the Linnanmäki amusement park in Helsinki, Finland. Kirnu is Intamin's first ball coaster.

== Layout ==
The ride starts as riders climb the curved lift hill, followed by a quick pre-drop and immediately go into a sharp half loop, then through another half loop and finally another half loop before being slowed back down by near-vertical magnetic brakes; the coaster ends with a quarter loop before returning to the station.

== Notability ==
As Intamin's first ball coaster, it changed the way Finnish roller coasters were viewed. The ride has since inspired new ZacSpin roller coasters.

== Incidents ==
On 16 May 2007, a man injured his leg on Kirnu and its brakes were renewed.

After a fatal incident on the identical Inferno at Terra Mítica in Benidorm, Spain on 7 July 2014, Linnanmäki ceased operation of Kirnu for several days before reopening the coaster.
