= Insane (Gröna Lund) =

Roller coaster at Gröna Lund

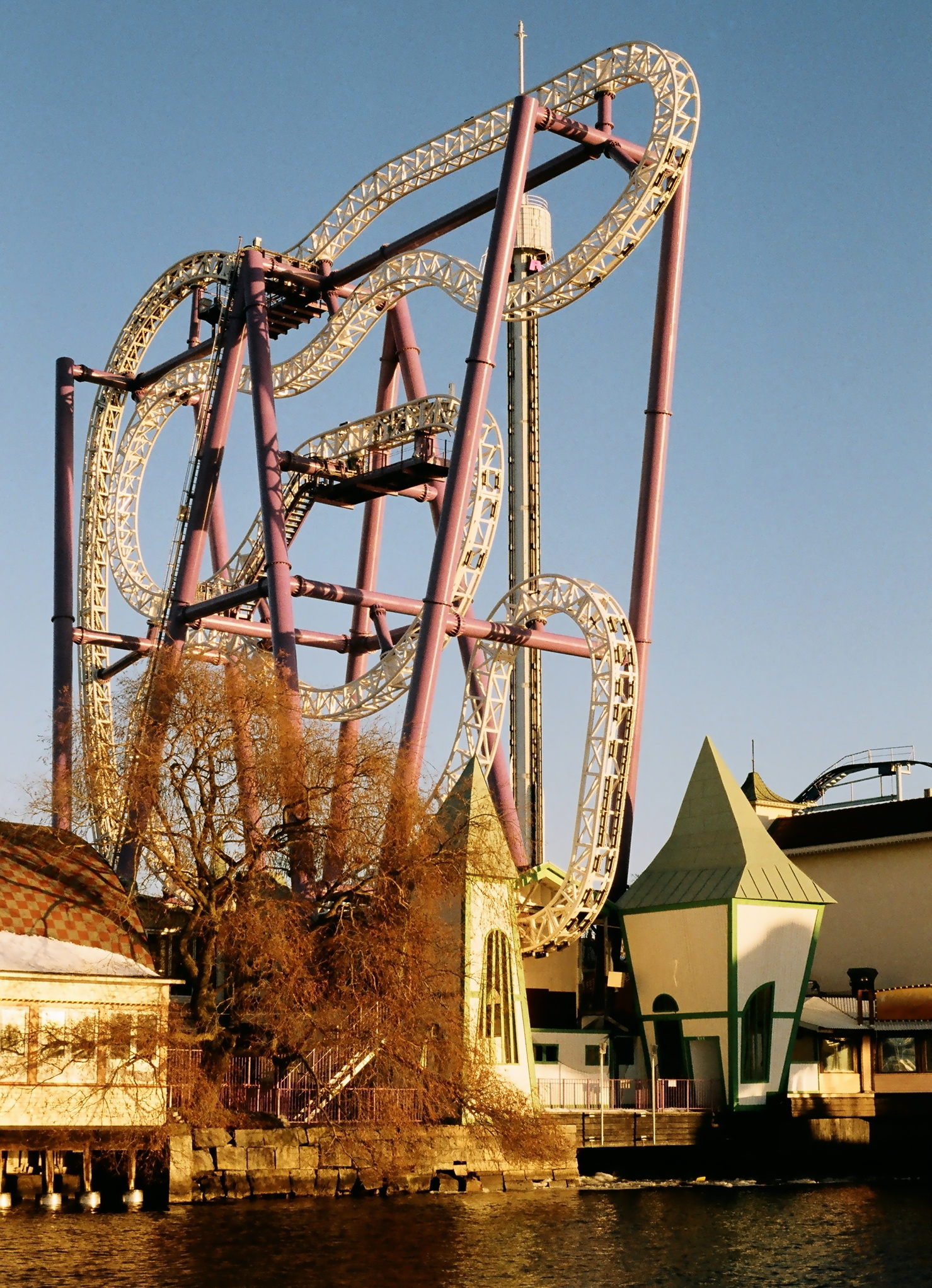
- Insane in 2017

Gröna Lund
- Location: Gröna Lund
- Coordinates: 59°19′24″N 18°5′43″E
- Status: Operating
- Opening date: 25 April 2009

General statistics
- Type: Steel – 4th Dimension
- Manufacturer: Intamin
- Model: ZacSpin
- Height: 35.5 m (116 ft)
- Length: 320 m (1,050 ft)
- Speed: 60 km/h (37 mph)
- G-force: 3.5
- Height restriction: 55 in (140 cm)
- Insane at RCDB

Insane is a steel fourth-dimension roller coaster at Gröna Lund in Stockholm, Sweden. It was built by Intamin and is an installation of their first generation ZacSpin model. It opened on 25 April 2009.

The ride's trains consist of a single car. This car contains two rows of four seats featuring wing seating, for a total of eight riders per cycle. While navigating the layout, the cars are free to spin and flip.

After the deadly incident on Inferno, a coaster of the same model at Terra Mítica in Benidorm, Spain on 7 July 2014, Gröna Lund ceased Insane's operations for several days before reopening it.
