= Eejanaika (roller coaster) =

Roller coaster

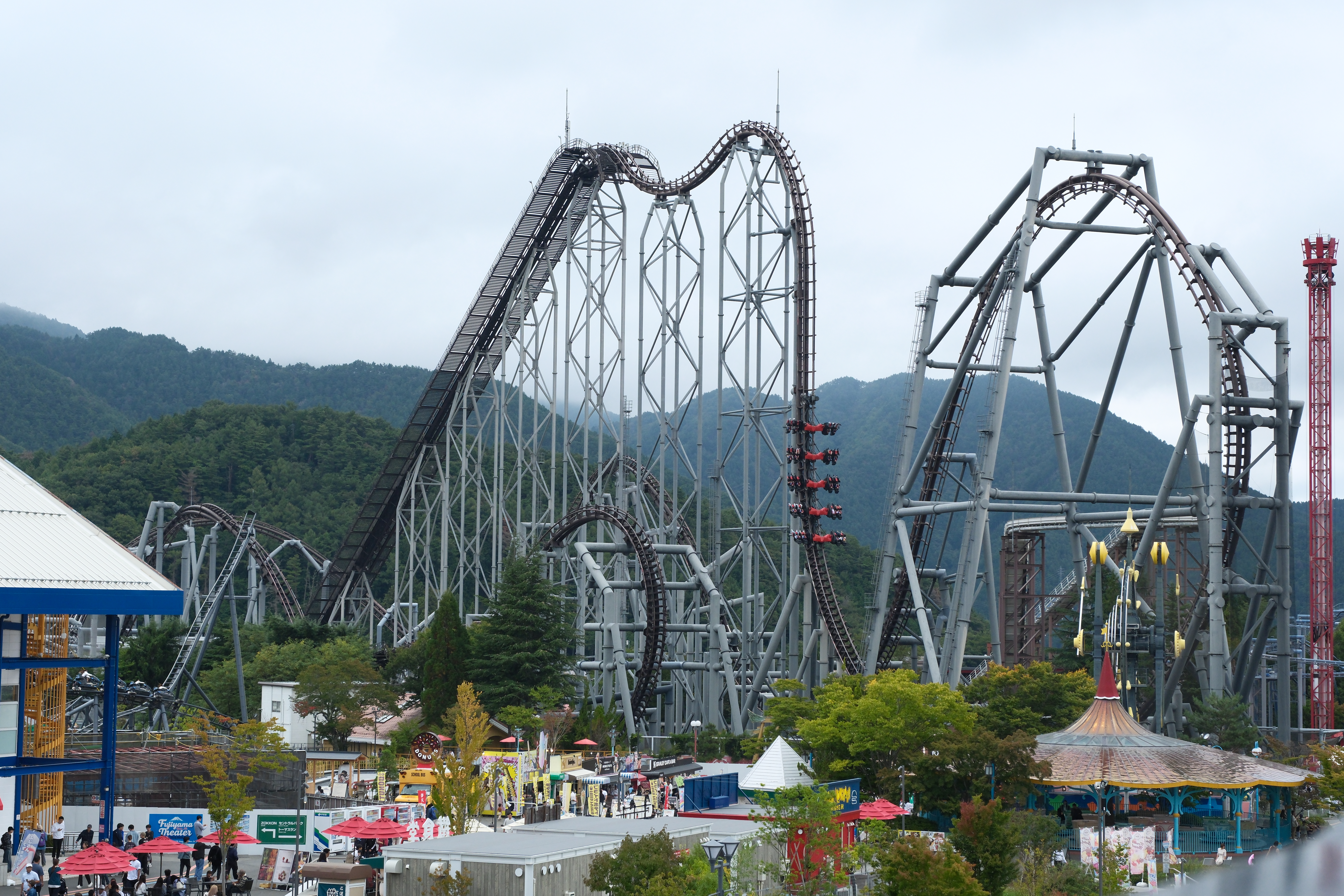
- Eejanaika with its current brown track color and trains

Fuji-Q Highland
- Location: Fuji-Q Highland
- Coordinates: 35°29′18″N 138°46′51″E
- Status: Operating
- Opening date: 19 July 2006
- Cost: 3,500,000,000 Yen ($31,601,283 USD)

General statistics
- Type: Steel – Fourth-dimension
- Manufacturer: S&S – Sansei Technologies
- Designer: Alan Schilke
- Model: Fourth-dimension coaster
- Lift/launch system: Chain lift hill
- Height: 249.33 ft (76.00 m)
- Length: 3,782.83 ft (1,153.01 m)
- Speed: 78.3 mph (126.0 km/h)
- Inversions: 3
- Duration: 2:10
- Max vertical angle: 89°
- Capacity: 1000 riders per hour
- G-force: 3.67
- Height restriction: 125–200 cm (4 ft 1 in – 6 ft 7 in)
- Trains: 5 cars; riders arranged 4 across in a single row for a total of 20 riders per train
- Eejanaika at RCDB

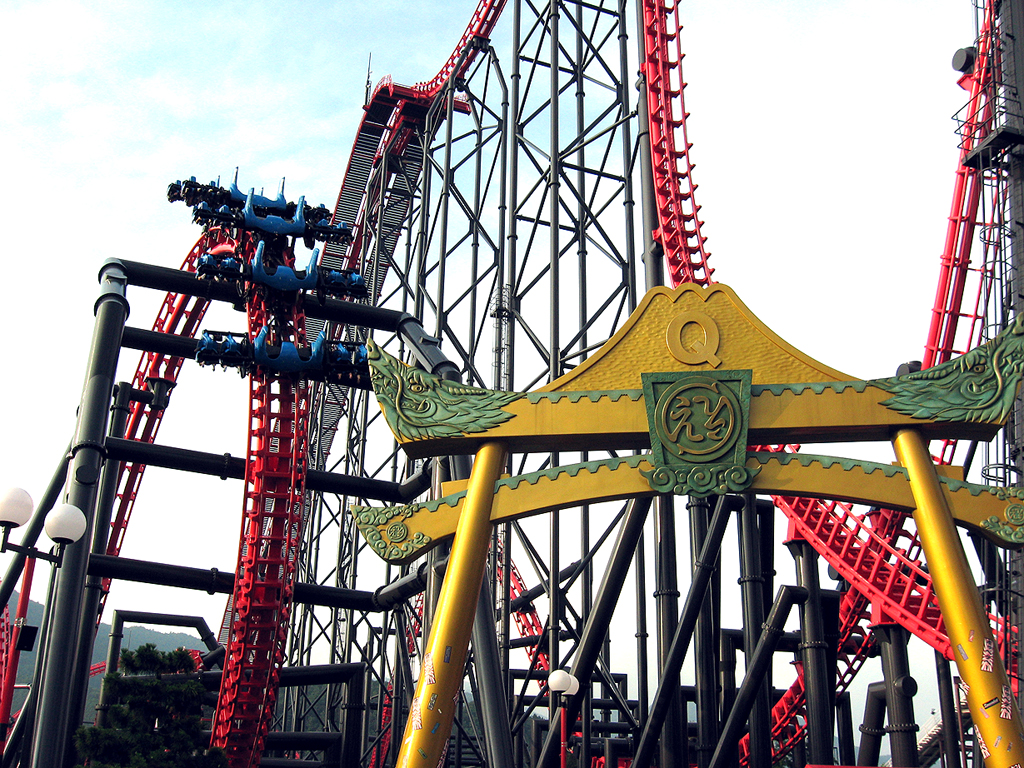
Eejanaika with its original red track color and trains

Eejanaika (ええじゃないか) is a steel hypercoaster at Fuji-Q Highland in Fujiyoshida, Yamanashi, Japan, that opened on 19 July 2006. It is taller, faster, and longer than its predecessor, X2, at Six Flags Magic Mountain, California.

The roller coaster, designed by S&S Arrow, is the world's second fourth-dimension coaster, a design by which the seats rotate forward or backward 360 degrees in a controlled spin. This is achieved by having four rails on the track: two are running rails while the other two are for spin control. The two rails that control the spin of the seats move up and down relative to the track and spin the seats using a rack and pinion gear mechanism.

Eejanaika's official Japanese spelling is stylized, with the second "え" kana being turned upside down. Eejanaika has several meanings, but is most commonly translated to "Ain't it great!" in English. According to the Guinness Book of World Records, Eejanaika ties with the Smiler at Alton Towers for the world record of most inversions in a coaster, as both coasters contain 14 inversions. However, this is disputed, because 11 of Eejanaika's inversions are inversions of the seat, rather than inversions of the track, and all of the Smiler's inversions are track inversions.

Eejanaika's tracks were initially painted red with black supports, but following the addition of Mount Fuji to the UNESCO World Heritage List as a cultural site in June 2013, Fuji-Q progressively repainted its tracks to the current dark brown with grey supports between 2013 and 2014. Its trains were also updated.

== Ride experience ==
The 1,153 m (3,783 ft) roller coaster features 14 inversions, 1 zero-g roll, a fly-to-lie, 2 raven turns, and a half camelback twist. Unlike its predecessor, X2, Eejanaika's track layout resembles a horseshoe pattern, with an overbanked turn flying just over the U-turn between the station and the lift hill.

Just before departing from the loading station, following a pre-recorded safety reminder, the loading floors are lowered and a simulated siren is sounded. Ride operators clap and chant "Eejanaika, Eejanaika" as the train departs from the station. As the train makes a 180-degree turn onto the lift hill, the cars are rotated 90 degrees backward before rotating back 45 degrees shortly before entering the hill. After ascending 76 m (249 ft), the train enters a pre-drop. During this lift, riders are facing backwards. The first drop is 65 m (213 ft) and is sloped at 89 degrees, at the base of which ride vehicles attain a maximum speed of 126 km/h (78 mph).

During the initial drop, the seat assembly is rotated so that riders are positioned facing the ground. Similar to X2, the seats are then rotated forward 360 degrees one to three times, simulating a front flip as the train descends the drop. The train then enters an inside raven turn, where the cars are rotated again halfway through the loop to create a "lie-to-fly" maneuver; however, unlike X2, the seat assemblies rotate backward 360 degrees, simulating a backflip, on the top of the raven turn, before riders transition to a prone position, facing forward. After exiting the raven turn, the trains traverse through a zero-g roll. The train twists clockwise for one full turn; at the same time, the seats rotate forward one full turn. This is followed by an overbanked turn and a half-twist "fly-to-lie" maneuver, in which the train twists counterclockwise one half-turn as riders flip backward one half-turn to return to the original position of laying on their backs. The train then enters an outside raven turn immediately followed by another half-twist and half-backward seat rotation. As the track levels out and the train enters the final brake run, seats rotate 90 degrees forward and riders briefly face downward before the seats rotate back to its initial starting position as the train returns to the station.

== Awards ==
Golden Ticket Awards: Top steel Roller Coasters
Year									1998	1999
Ranking									–	–
Year	2000	2001	2002	2003	2004	2005	2006	2007	2008	2009
Ranking	–	–	–	–	–	–	–	–	–	–
Year	2010	2011	2012	2013	2014	2015	2016	2017	2018	2019
Ranking	–	–	–	–	–	–	–	–	–	–
Year	2020	2021	2022	2023	2024	2025	2026			
Ranking	N/A	–	–	–	–	49 (tie)	35 (tie)			

== Incidents ==
- On 13 December 2007, a stopped vehicle suddenly started moving, and an employee who was inspecting the coaster was caught between the vehicle and the rail, breaking his chest bone and sustaining a serious injury.
- On 29 April 2012, a bolt broke and fell from a running vehicle, hitting the forehead of a female park guest who was walking under the tracks, causing minor injuries. The ride was closed for two months until 11 July, when Fuji-Q reopened Eejanaika with new safety procedures, including the closure of the walkway where the incident took place, as well as the ban of wearing shoes while riding, and a ban on bringing audio/video equipment onto the ride.
- On 28 February 2025, a maintenance worker was killed after being hit by one of Eejanaika's trains while inspecting the ride. The ride was closed for several weeks, reopening again in May 2025 following the introduction of lockout procedures.

== See also ==
- Alan Schilke, the inventor of the fourth dimension roller coaster
- Ee ja nai ka
