= Fuji-Q Highland =

Amusement park in Japan

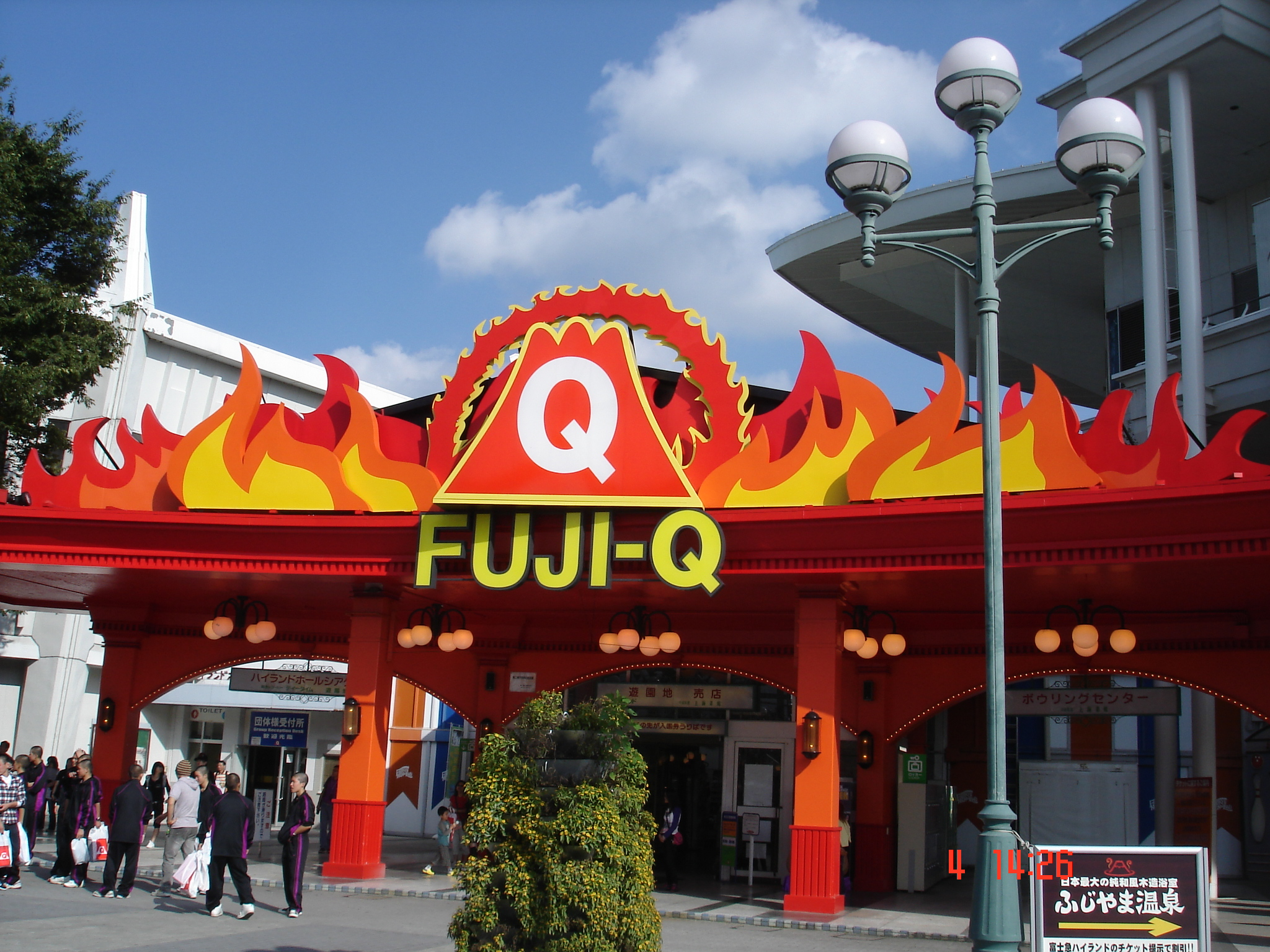
- Entrance to the park
- Interactive map of Fuji-Q Highland
- Location: 5 Chome-6-1 Shinnishihara, Fujiyoshida-shi, Yamanashi-ken 403-0017, Japan
- Coordinates: 35.487°N 138.780°E
- Status: Operating
- Opened: 2 March 1968
- Owner: Fujikyu Highland Co., Ltd. (Fuji Kyuko)
- Operating season: Year-round

Attractions
- Roller coasters: 6
- Website: www.fujiq.jp/en/

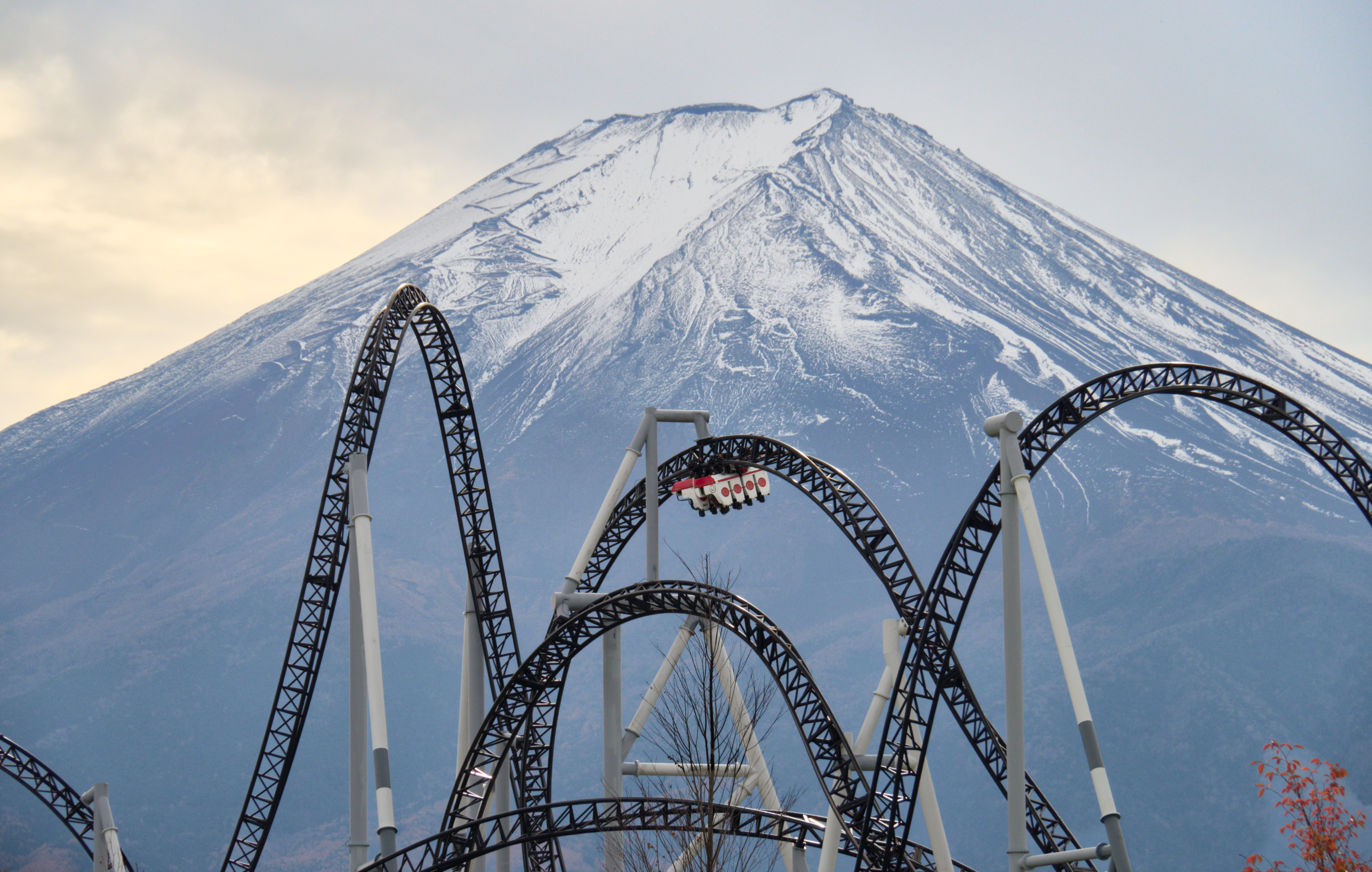
Takabisha with Mount Fuji in the background

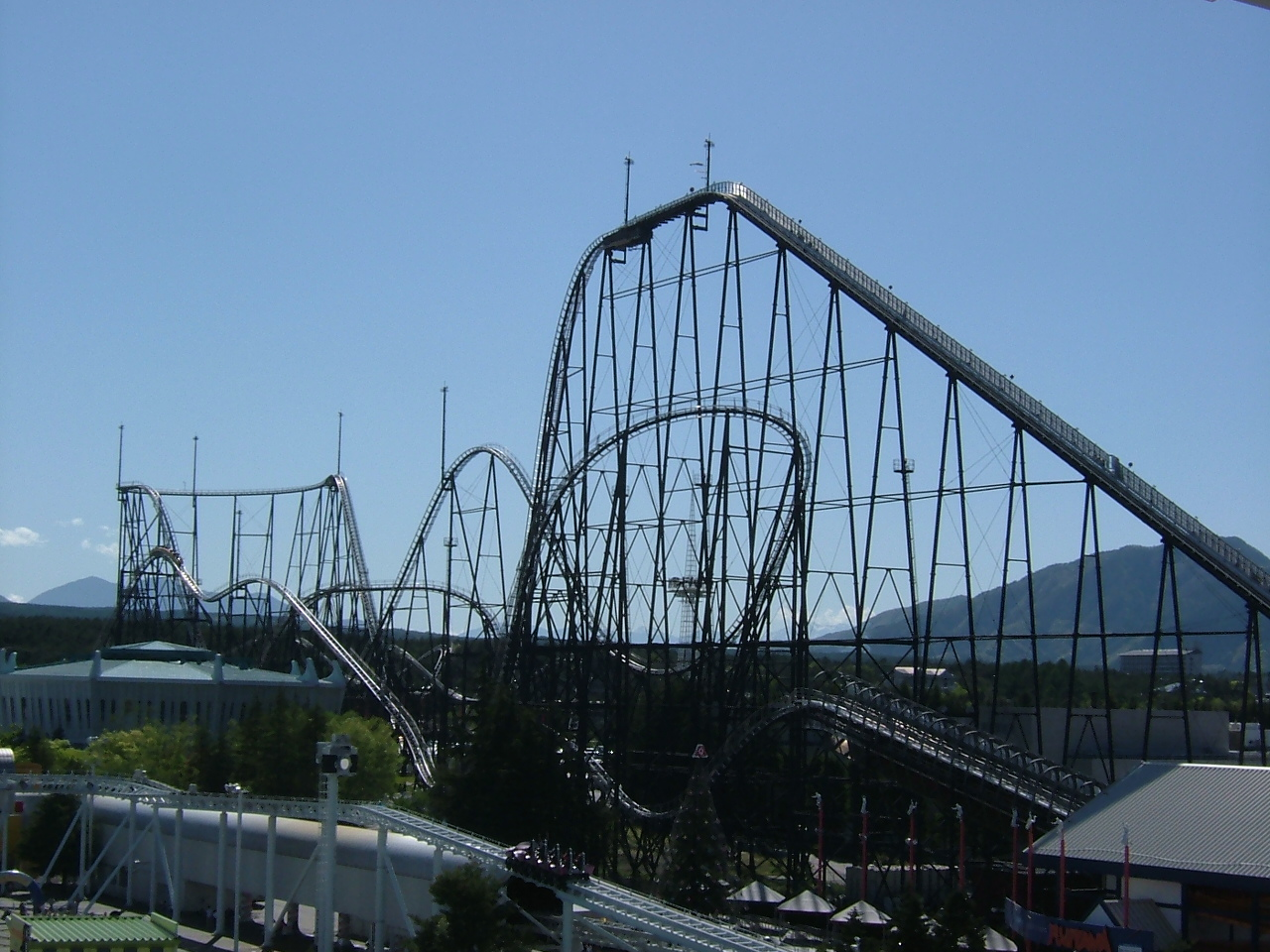
Fujiyama, the longest and tallest roller coaster at Fuji-Q Highland

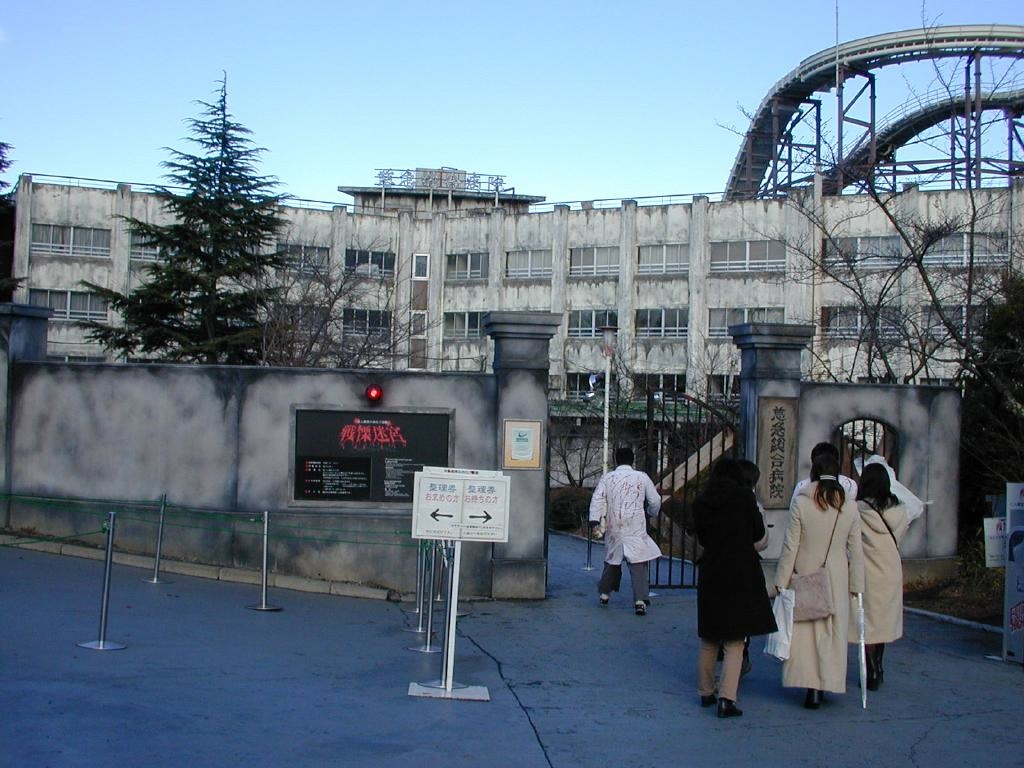
The Haunted Hospital

Fuji-Q Highland (富士急ハイランド, Fujikyū Hairando; formerly the Fujikyu Highland) is an amusement park in Fujiyoshida, Yamanashi, Japan, owned and operated by the namesake Fujikyuko Co. It opened on 2 March 1968.

The park is near the base of Mount Fuji. It has a number of roller coasters, as well as two haunted attractions: the Haunted Hospital and the Hopeless Fortress. Other attractions include Thomas Land, a children's area with a Thomas the Tank Engine theme, and several other attractions themed after GeGeGe no Kitarō, Naruto, and Attack on Titan.

Fuji-Q Highland was the location of the former Do-Dodonpa (ド･ドドンパ) roller coaster, which once held the record for fastest acceleration of any roller coaster in the world. It also previously housed attractions themed to Mobile Suit Gundam, Hamtaro, and Neon Genesis Evangelion.

== Attractions ==
=== Roller coasters ===
Fuji-Q Highland has six roller coasters:

- Eejanaika (ええじゃないか): 76 metres tall (249.33 ft), 126 km/h (78.3 mph). Opened on 19 July 2006 and is one of three fourth dimension roller coasters built by S&S Arrow. As a fourth dimension roller coaster, its seats can rotate 360 degrees forward or backward in a controlled spin, thus allowing Eejanaika to invert 14 different times, even though the track itself inverts only three times.
- Fujiyama (フジヤマ): 79 metres tall (259 ft), 130 km/h (81 mph). Opened in 1996 and was once the world's tallest roller coaster. As of 2025, it is the world's 4th longest and 11th tallest roller coaster.
- Nia and Animal Coaster (ニアとアニマルコースター): 0.9 metres tall (3 ft), 17 km/h (11.2 mph). Opened on 18 July 1998. A kiddie coaster themed after Thomas the Tank Engine. Known as Rock 'N Roll Duncan (ロックンロールダンカン) from 1998 to 2023.
- Takabisha (高飛車): 43 metres tall (141 ft), 100 km/h (62 mph). Opened on 16 July 2011. Contains a 121° freefall, as well as seven major inversions over 1000 metres of track. It opened as the world's steepest roller coaster, and retained the record until the opening of TMNT Shellraiser in 2019.
- Voyage Dans Le Ciel (リサとガスパールのそらたびにっき): 20 metres tall (75.5 ft), 50 km/h (31.1 mph). Originally opened on 20 July 2000 as a flying coaster named Birdmen (バードメン). Was converted to an inverted coaster in 2003 due to mechanical issues. Known as Great Fluffy Sky Adventure (ふわふわお空の大冒険) from 2003 to 2017.
- Zokkon (ぞっこん): 25 metres tall (82 ft), 73 km/h (45.4 mph). Opened on 20 July 2023. Launched steel family coaster.

Name	Manufacturer	Year opened	Type
Fujiyama (フジヤマ)	TOGO	1996	Steel roller coaster
Nia and Animal Coaster (ニアとアニマルコースター)	Sansei Technologies	1998	Steel children's roller coaster
Voyage Dans Le Ciel (リサとガスパールのそらたびにっき)	Hoei Sangyo	2001	Steel inverted roller coaster
Eejanaika (ええじゃないか)	S&S Arrow	2006	Steel fourth-dimension roller coaster
Takabisha (高飛車)	Gerstlauer	2011	Steel roller coaster (Euro-Fighter)
Zokkon (ぞっこん)	Intamin	2023	Steel launched motorbike roller coaster (Family Launch Coaster)

=== Other rides ===
- Fuji Airways
- Haunted Hospital – Haunted attraction
- Hopeless Fortress – Haunted attraction
- Nagashimasuka – Hafema River Rapid Ride
- Panic Clock – Vekoma Air Jumper
- Red Tower – S&S – Sansei Technologies Turbo Drop
- Tekkotsu Bancho – Funtime Star Flyer
- Tentekomai – Gerstlauer Sky Roller
- Tondemina – HUSS Park Attractions Giant Frisbee

== Incidents ==
- From December 2020 to August 2021, at least 6 visitors were injured while riding the Do-Dodonpa roller coaster. This led to the coaster's eventual closure in 2024.
- On 28 February 2025, a park employee was fatally injured after being crushed between one of Eejanaika's trains and its track. Concerns were raised by media that the train was unintentionally moved during the maintenance and, consequently, about lapses in mandatory safety requirements, including to disconnect power when performing maintenance on rides.

== In popular culture ==
- In the 1985 Hong Kong comedy action film My Lucky Stars, starring Sammo Hung and Jackie Chan, the criminal gang's headquarters are underneath Fuji-Q Highland.
- In 2006, on the ninth season of the American reality game show The Amazing Race, the final 3 teams visited Fuji-Q Highland and rode Tondemina, Dodonpa and Fujiyama while looking for a clue to their next destination.
