= Dinoconda =

Roller coaster in China Dinosaurs Park

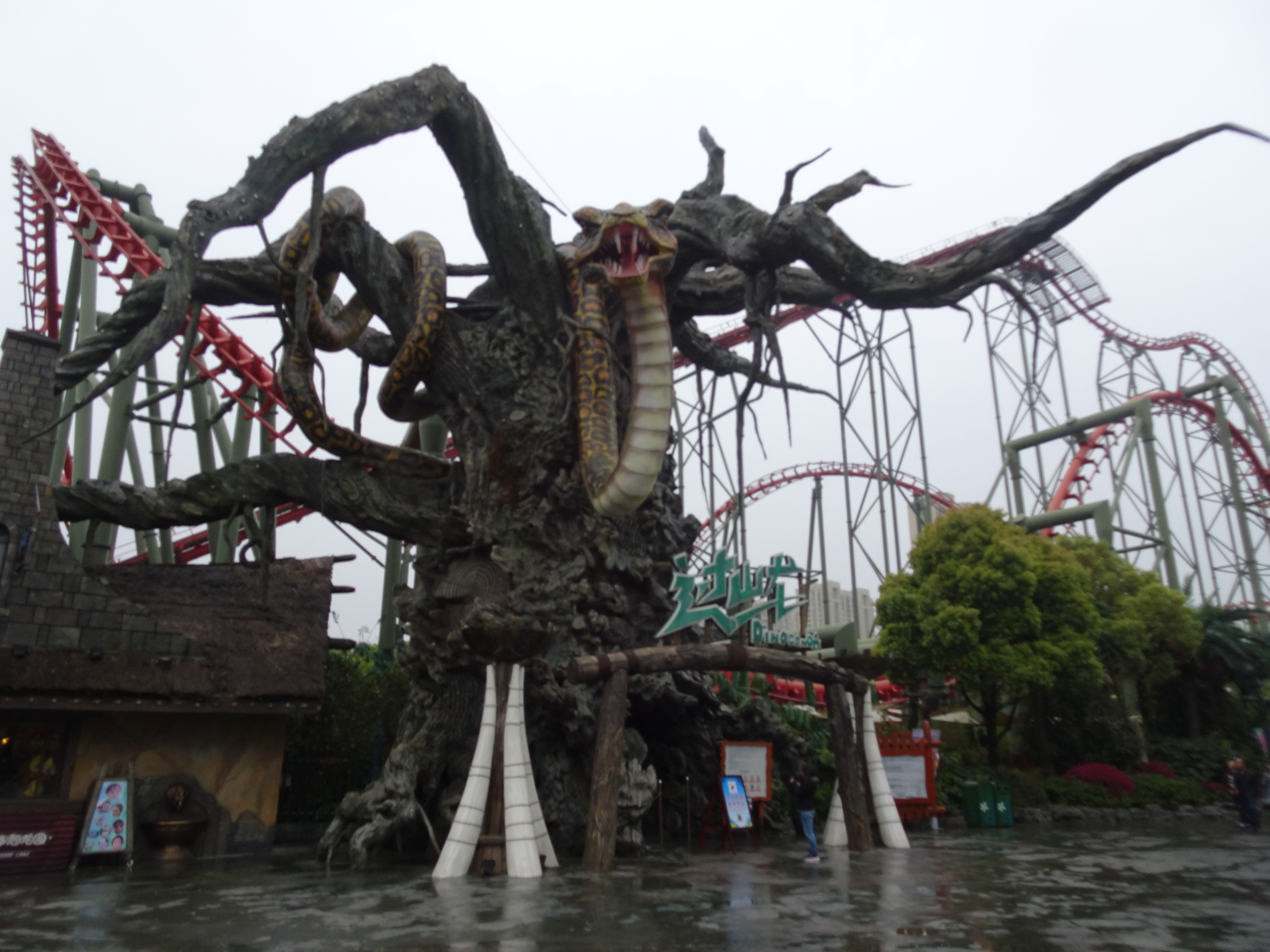

China Dinosaurs Park
- Location: China Dinosaurs Park
- Coordinates: 31.824512°N 119.995523°E
- Status: Operating
- Opening date: April 29, 2012

General statistics
- Type: Steel – 4th Dimension
- Manufacturer: S&S – Sansei Technologies
- Model: 4th Dimension Coaster
- Height: 226.4 ft (69.0 m)
- Length: 3,444.9 ft (1,050.0 m)
- Speed: 78.3 mph (126.0 km/h)
- Inversions: 3
- Height restriction: 140 cm (4 ft 7 in)
- Trains: 6 cars; riders arranged 4 across in a single row for a total of 24 riders per train
- Dinoconda at RCDB

Dinoconda is an S&S – Sansei Technologies 4th Dimension roller coaster located at China Dinosaurs Park in Jiangsu, China. It is one of only two operating 4D hypercoasters in the world. It has a capacity of 24 riders per train.
