= Cobra (Tivoli Friheden) =

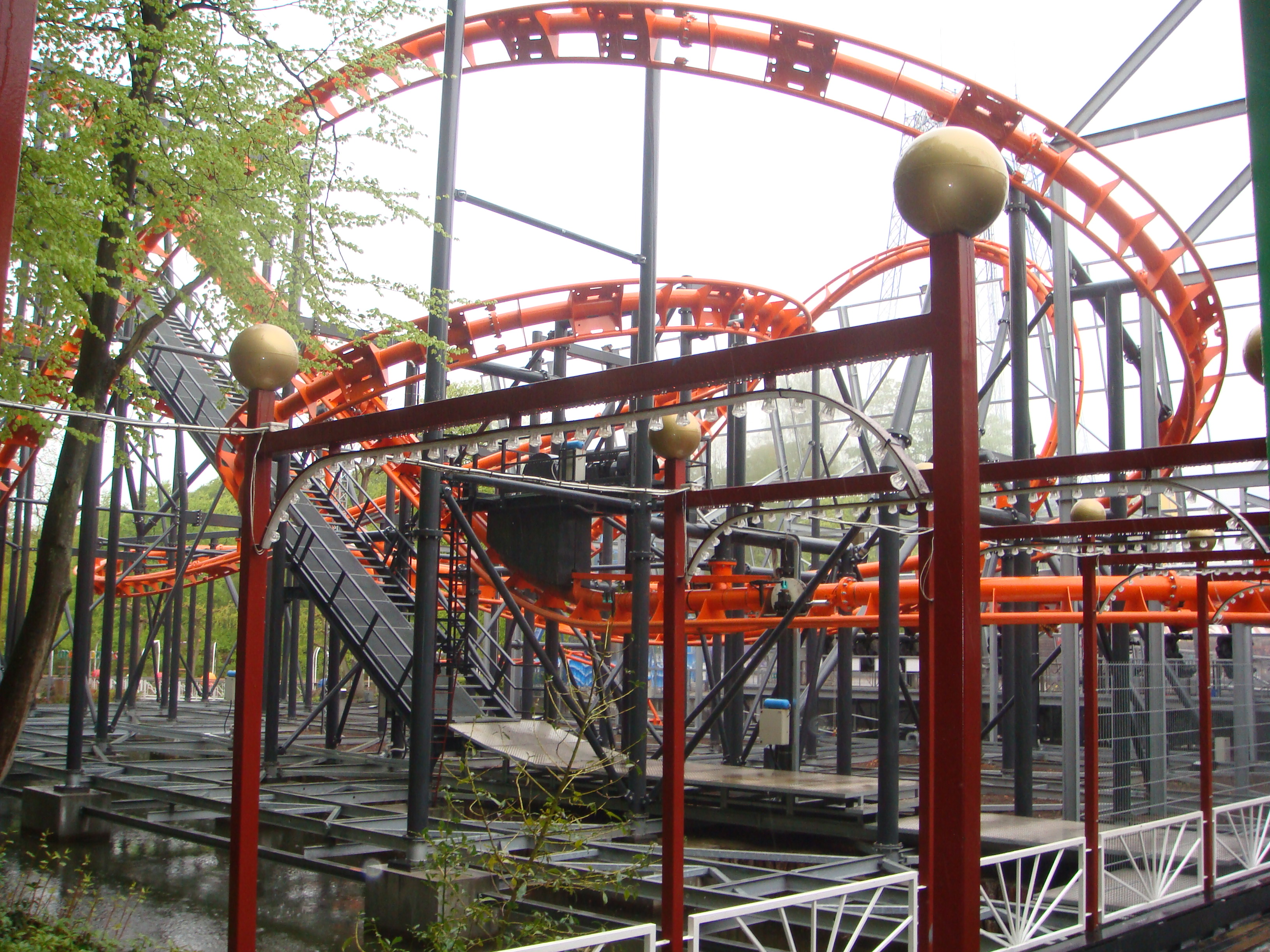

Tivoli Friheden Aarhus, Denmark
- Location: Tivoli Friheden; Aarhus, Denmark
- Coordinates: 56.135835°N 10.197871°E
- Status: Removed
- Opening date: June 28, 2008
- Closing date: July 14, 2022

General statistics
- Type: Steel – Inverted
- Manufacturer: Sartori Rides
- Designer: Ride Tek
- Model: compact Inverted Coaster
- Lift/launch system: Chain lift hill
- Height: 82 ft (25 m)
- Length: 1,312 ft (400 m)
- Speed: 43.5 mph (70.0 km/h)
- Inversions: 3
- Capacity: 720 riders per hour
- G-force: 4.5
- Cobra at RCDB

Cobra was a steel inverted roller coaster at the Tivoli Friheden amusement park in Denmark.

== Incident and closure ==
On July 4, 2008, six days after the official opening of the ride, the front cart fell off the rails and fell to the ground, injuring four people. After repairs and testing following the incident, the ride was closed until late May 2009.

On July 14, 2022, 14 years after the first incident, a 14-year-old girl was killed while riding the Cobra, after the rearmost cart of the ride broke off and was hanging from the rest of the roller coaster. A 13-year-old boy was also injured. This incident resulted in the closure of the park for two days, and a police investigation was started on July 2022 to determine the cause. In September 2024, the investigation ended, concluding that no person or company neglected their duties or could have known of the risk of failure, thus ending without prosecution. The ride has also permanently ceased operation due to the incident, and has since been torn down.
