= Fourth-dimension roller coaster =

Type of steel roller coaster

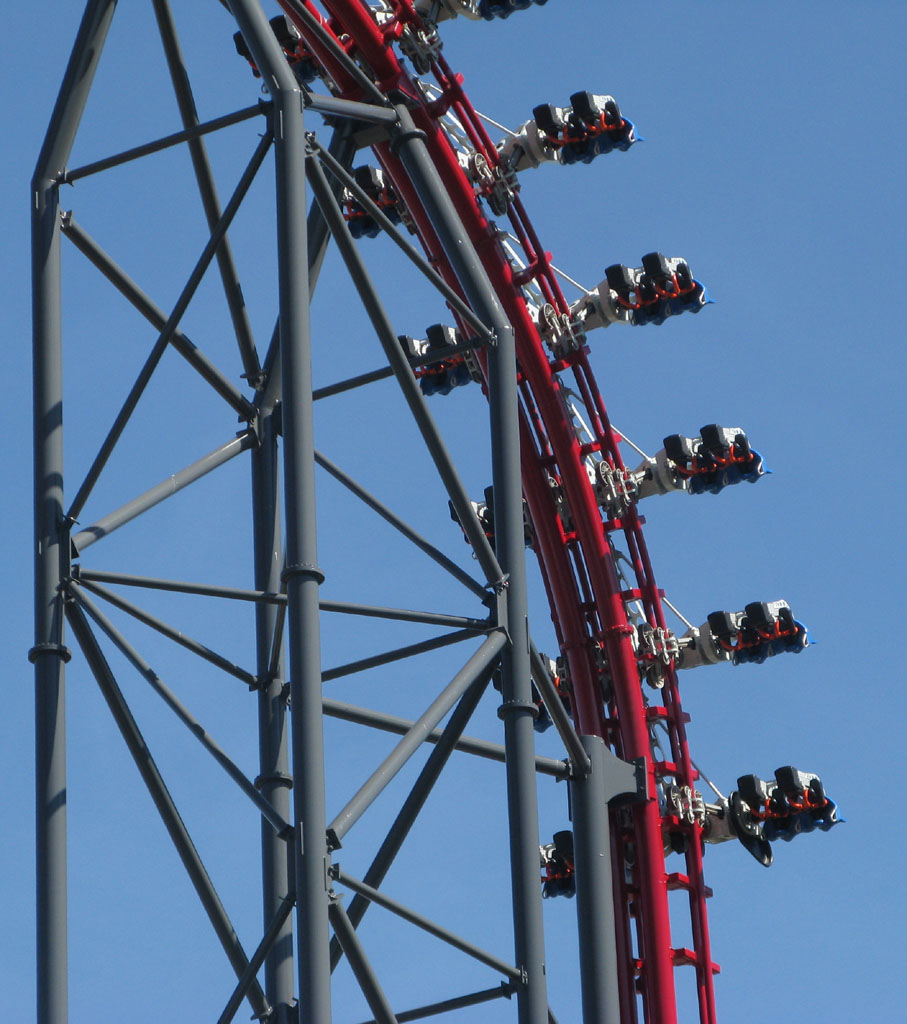
- 'X2' (formerly 'X') was the first fourth-dimension roller coaster in the world.
- Status: In production
- First manufactured: 2002
- No. of installations: 18
- Manufacturers: Arrow Dynamics (discontinued), S&S Worldwide, and Intamin
- Riders per row: 4
- Restraint Style: Over-the-shoulder

A fourth-dimension roller coaster is a type of steel roller coaster where riders are rotated independently of the track's orientation about a horizontal axis perpendicular to the track. This feature allows riders to experience inversions without the track rotating upside down. Some fourth-dimension roller coaster's seat are controlled, with seats that rotate based on the spacing of two additional rails on the track. Others are free-spinning, where the seats flip primarily due to forces exerted by the ride's elements, offering a different experience during each ride.

== History ==
In 1996, John F. Mares, a corporate attorney, invented a fourth-dimension roller coaster concept and holds six US patents related to the technology of their spinning seat systems: U.S. patent 5,791,254, U.S. patent 6,098,549, U.S. patent 6,227,121, U.S. patent 6,386,115, U.S. patent 6,477,961 & U.S. patent 6,606,953. In this concept, riders control the spinning action themselves.

The first fourth-dimension roller coaster to be built, X2, which opened at Six Flags Magic Mountain in 2002, was designed and patented by Alan Schilke. In 2007, Intamin launched a variation of the fourth-dimension roller coaster under the name ZacSpin.

== Design ==
=== Arrow Dynamics and S&S Worldwide ===
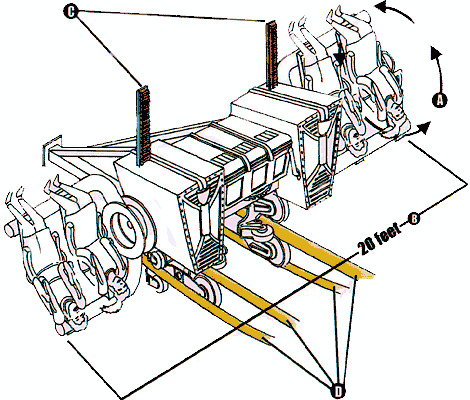
A) Rotation of seats B) Seat on axle C) Rack gear D) Four rails

Arrow Dynamics was the first company to produce a fourth-dimension roller coaster, lending its name to the ride style. The trains feature seats capable of rotating forward or backward, 360 degrees in a controlled spin. This is achieved by having four rails on the track; two acting as per normal, and two to control the spin of the seats. The two rails that control the spin of the seats, known as "X Rails", vary in height relative to the track, and spin the train using a rack and pinion gear mechanism.

The first installation, X, was a prototype and cost Arrow Dynamics and Six Flags itself a lot of money due to technical difficulties and design flaws. In 2002, the park sued Arrow Dynamics, which went into bankruptcy. Since then, Arrow was bought out by S&S Worldwide and became the company's steel coaster division, S&S Arrow. In 2006, a second installation opened at Fuji-Q Highland in Japan under the name Eejanaika. A third installation opened in 2012 at China Dinosaurs Park in China under the name Dinoconda. The original X coaster at Six Flags Magic Mountain reopened as X2 in 2008 with new, lighter trains and improved reliability and effects.

=== Intamin ZacSpin first generation ===
The Intamin ZacSpin was developed in response to the Arrow Dynamics fourth-dimension roller coaster. Some of the main differences between the Intamin and Arrow Dynamics/S&S Worldwide versions are the uncontrolled rotation of the seats, which produces a different ride each time, no need for an additional rail, and single cars with two riders back-to-back. Since these single cars do not rotate around the riders but around a common point quite far back behind their backs, this gave rise to complaints of rider discomfort. Another notable difference is the absence of any lateral movements, causing some enthusiasts to not consider the rides to be fourth-dimension roller coasters due to the fact that all movement is restricted to a two-dimensional plane.

The roller coaster Kirnu at Linnanmäki in Helsinki, Finland, opened for the 2007 season and was the first of its kind. Later that year Inferno opened at Terra Mítica in Benidorm, Spain with an identical compact layout. In 2009, Insane opened at Gröna Lund in Stockholm, Sweden with a different track layout. In 2011, the first ZacSpin in the United States opened at Six Flags Magic Mountain as Green Lantern: First Flight, and was themed to the DC Comics superhero of the same name. It features the same layout as Insane.

=== S&S Free Spin ===
In late 2012, S&S Worldwide unveiled a new concept called Free Spin which features a similar ride to Intamin ZacSpin. Each vehicle features two seating rows, and each row rotates independently. As the axis of rotation is at the center of mass of each guest, rider comfort is significantly improved. Like with ZacSpin, Seats spin freely, but during several track sections a system of magnets forces a controlled inversion. The first installation of a 4D Free Spin was Batman: The Ride at Six Flags Fiesta Texas in 2015.

=== Intamin ZacSpin second generation ===
In 2016, Intamin announced an updated version that like Free Spin also features a vehicle with two seating rows rotating independently, and an axis of rotation at the center of mass of each guest to improve rider comfort.

=== Pax Bumerang ===
In 2023, Russian amusement ride manufacturer Pax unveiled two concepts for shuttle fourth-dimension coasters. Like the S&S and Intamin versions, the track is vertically stacked, and the seats spin freely. The smaller model pulls a 16-passenger train up the outside of an approximately 98-foot (30 m) spike, then drops it into an outside raven turn. The train then travels up a shorter spike before rolling back down it and traversing the same layout backwards. This model is listed at a length of 390-foot (120 m) and a price of 42,000,000 ₽, or US$492,836.27. The larger model pulls a 20-passenger train up the inside of an approximately 130-foot (40 m) spike, dropping riders into an inside raven turn, then an outside raven turn stacked above it. The train then reaches the top of the 560-foot (170 m) track and rolls back, traversing the layout backwards to the station. This model is listed at a price of 72,000,000 ₽, or US$844,862.18. The first Bumerang opened in 2025 as Boomerang at Sky Park Baytik in Kyrgyzstan.

== Inversion ambiguity ==
There is considerable debate within the roller coaster community as to whether or not the spinning of these coasters qualifies as an inversion for the purpose of records. Guinness World Records gave Eejanaika the record with 14 inversions. However, other more coaster-specific record bodies such as the Roller Coaster Database do not recognize this claim and instead count only track inversions, which gives the record of 14 to The Smiler at Alton Towers in Staffordshire, United Kingdom.

== Installations ==
Name	Park	Years	Model	Status	Image
Batman: The Ride	(United States) Six Flags Fiesta Texas	2015 to present	S&S Worldwide 4D Free Spin	Operating	
Batman: The Ride	(United States) Six Flags Discovery Kingdom	2019 to present	S&S Worldwide 4D Free Spin	Operating	
Arashi	(Japan) Nagashima Spa Land	2017 to present	S&S Worldwide 4D Free Spin	Operating	
The Joker	(United States) Six Flags Great Adventure	2016 to present	S&S Worldwide 4D Free Spin	Operating	
The Joker	(United States) Six Flags Great America	2017 to present	S&S Worldwide 4D Free Spin	Operating	
The Joker	(United States) Six Flags Over Texas	2017 to present	S&S Worldwide 4D Free Spin	Operating	
The Joker	(United States) Six Flags New England	2017 to present	S&S Worldwide 4D Free Spin	Operating	
Wonder Woman Coaster	(Mexico) Six Flags México	2018 to present	S&S Worldwide 4D Free Spin	Operating	
Dinoconda	China Dinosaur Park	2012 to present	S&S Worldwide 4th Dimension	Operating	
Dragon Slayer	(United States) Adventureland Park	2021 to present	S&S Sansei 4D Free Spin	Operating	
Eejanaika	(Japan) Fuji-Q Highland	2006 to present	S&S Arrow 4th Dimension	Operating	
Inferno	(Spain) Terra Mítica	2007 to present	Intamin ZacSpin	Operating	
Insane	(Sweden) Gröna Lund	2009 to present	Intamin ZacSpin	Operating	
John Wick: Open Contract	(United Arab Emirates) Motiongate Dubai	2022 to present	S&S Worldwide 4D Free Spin	Operating	
Boomerang	(Kyrgyzstan) Sky Park Baytik	2025 to present	Pax Bumerang	Operating	
Kirnu	(Finland) Linnanmäki	2007 to present	Intamin ZacSpin	Operating	
Tumbili	(United States) Kings Dominion	2022 to present	S&S Sansei 4D Free Spin	Operating	
X2; Formerly X	(United States) Six Flags Magic Mountain	2002-2026	Arrow Dynamics 4th Dimension	Closed	
Green Lantern: First Flight was to be relocated to La Ronde as Vipère	(United States) Six Flags Magic Mountain	2011-2017: operated 2017-2019: inactive	Intamin ZacSpin	Removed	
Green Lantern: First Flight was to be relocated to La Ronde as Vipère	(Canada) La Ronde	2019-2022: stored 2022: cancelled	Intamin ZacSpin	Cancelled; in storage	

== See also ==
- Wing Coaster – a type of ride by Bolliger & Mabillard which features similar trains to the S&S/Arrow design
