= Texas Tornado (disambiguation) =

Texas Tornado is a Junior A hockey team.

Texas Tornado may also refer to:

- Texas Tornado (roller coaster), Wonderland amusement park, Amarillo, Texas
- "Texas Tornado" (song), a 1995 song by Tracy Lawrence from the album I See It Now
- Kerry Von Erich (1960–1993), professional wrestler also known as "The Texas Tornado"
- Colin Edwards (born 1974), motorcycle racer also known as the "Texas Tornado"
- The Texas Tornado (1932 film), an American western film
- The Texas Tornado (1928 film), an American silent western film
- Texas Tornado (album), the second solo album by Doug Sahm
- Vivian Villarreal, a professional pool player also known as the Texas Tornado

== See also ==
- Texas Tornados, a Tejano band
  - Texas Tornados (album)
- Texas Tornados, Buddy magazine's annual Texas musician hall of fame roster since 1978
- Texas Tornadoes (NAFL), a semi-professional floorball team
- Category:Tornadoes in Texas
