= Splashdown (log flume) =

Theme park feature

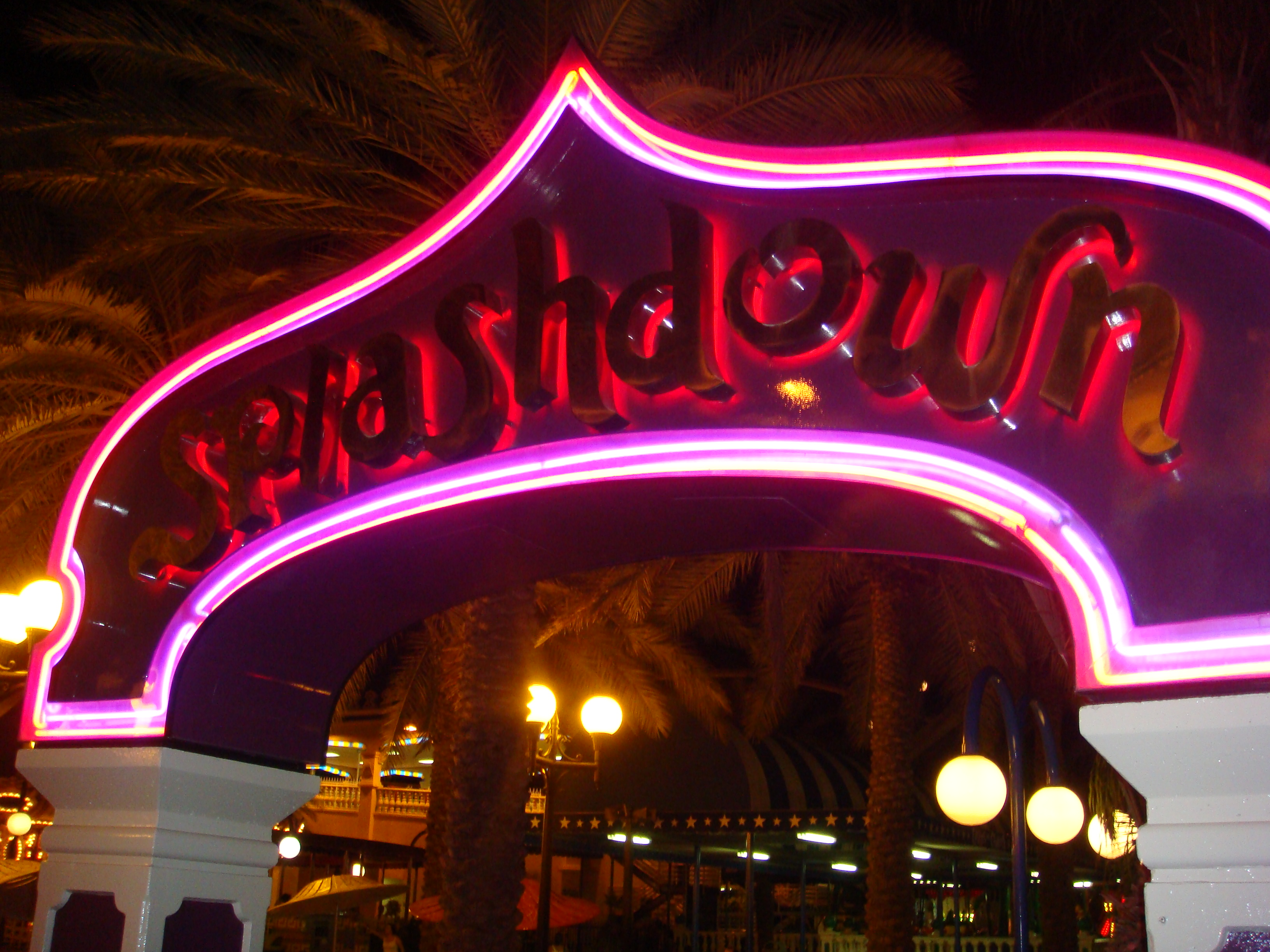
- Entrance sign for the attraction.

Castles N' Coasters
- Coordinates: 33.57162°N 112.11911°W
- Opening date: 1991

General statistics
- Type: Log flume
- Manufacturer: Hopkins Rides
- Lift system: 2 lift hills
- Drop: 30 ft (9.1 m)
- Duration: 3.5 minutes
- Height restriction: 36 in (91 cm)

Splashdown is a log flume located at Castles N' Coasters, a theme park in Phoenix, Arizona. It is noted for its two drops, as well as many other special features. The whole ride is themed after a logging expedition through Polynesia. Splashdown is also known for narrowly being dodged by the nearby Desert Storm roller coaster.

== Theme and experience ==
At the beginning of the ride, the "logs" disembark through a "logging town" with buildings such as banks or other stores. The logs then approach a tunnel. This tunnel has waterfalls and small geysers decorating the outside. The tunnel and ride narrowly turn and climb the first, smaller hill. After sliding down, the logs pass two realistic sculptures of African elephants that squirt water just above riders' heads. While turning again, the logs pass wrecked pirate ship, a Polynesian village, small gardens, and fountains. Eventually, the logs go up the largest, most notable hill, do a U-turn and take a steep plunge, does yet another U-turn, passing by the wreck once more before returning to the boarding dock.

== Features ==
- Two hills, each with separate lifts
- Tunnel
- "Logging Town"
- "Polynesian Village"
- Pirate ship wreck
- Fountains, geysers, and waterfalls
- Squirting African elephant sculptures
- Small gardens

== 2015 incident ==
On November 27, 2015, a 12-year-old boy fell from Splashdown. According to reports, he fell into the water after his foot became caught while he was standing on the ride. He sustained injuries including traumatic brain injury and was transported to Phoenix Children's Hospital for treatment.

== See also ==
- Castles N' Coasters
- Desert Storm (roller coaster)
- Log flume (attraction)
