= Knighty Knight Bugs =

1958 film by Friz Freleng

- Title card
- Directed by: Friz Freleng
- Story by: Warren Foster
- Starring: Mel Blanc
- Edited by: Treg Brown
- Music by: Milt Franklyn
- Animation by: Gerry Chiniquy; Arthur Davis; Virgil Ross
- Layouts by: Hawley Pratt
- Backgrounds by: Tom O'Loughlin
- Color process: Technicolor
- Production company: Warner Bros. Cartoons
- Distributed by: Warner Bros. Pictures
- Release date: August 23, 1958
- Running time: 6:28
- Language: English

Knighty Knight Bugs is a 1958 Warner Bros. Looney Tunes cartoon directed by Friz Freleng. The short was released on August 23, 1958, and stars Bugs Bunny and Yosemite Sam.

Knighty Knight Bugs is the only Bugs Bunny cartoon and the final Warner Bros. cartoon to win an Academy Award for Best Animated Short Film, which was awarded in 1959. The short was later included in the 1981 compilation film The Looney Looney Looney Bugs Bunny Movie. The cartoon's title is a pun on the phrase "nighty-night".

== Plot ==
Bugs Bunny aims his mallet at Black Knight Yosemite Sam

In the realm of King Arthur, trouble ensues when the infamous Black Knight Yosemite Sam steals the Singing Sword. King Arthur, looks to the Knights of the Round Table, as a volunteer to recover the stolen artifact, to which all of them reject, citing cowardice. Reluctantly, court jester Bugs Bunny is assigned the mission by King Arthur, facing execution if he fails.

Upon infiltrating the castle of the Black Knight, Bugs encounters a dragon, a companion to Yosemite Sam, suffering from a cold-induced sneezing fit. Taking advantage of the situation, Bugs retrieves the Singing Sword from the castle's chest. When Bugs wonders aloud why it is called the Singing Sword, it starts humming "Cuddle up a Little Closer, Lovey Mine" and causes Sam to wake up from his nap. As Bugs escapes, Yosemite Sam gives chase of the dragon, leading to a series of comical encounters. Bugs outsmarts Yosemite Sam by utilizing the castle's defenses against him, causing various mishaps, including Sam falling into the moat and being flattened by a failed catapult launch. Despite Sam's persistent pursuit, Bugs ultimately traps him and the dragon in an explosives stockade within the castle.

As Bugs departs with the Singing Sword, the dragon's sneeze triggers an explosion that propels Sam and the dragon towards the moon. Bugs bids them farewell as the Singing Sword plays "Aloha 'Oe" at the end.

== Awards ==
Knighty Knight Bugs is the fifth Merrie Melodies/Looney Tunes entry to win the Academy Award for Best Animated Short Film in 1959. In doing so, it beat out cartoons Walt Disney Studios' Paul Bunyan and Terrytoons' Sidney's Family Tree. It was the third Oscar-nominated Bugs Bunny cartoon, after A Wild Hare in 1941 and Hiawatha's Rabbit Hunt in 1942. The Oscar was presented to John W. Burton, the producer of this cartoon. After Burton's death, the Oscar was handed to the director, Friz Freleng. Also, this animated short film would be the last to win an Oscar for Warner Bros. Cartoons before its closure in 1963.

In the Tiny Toon Adventures episode "Who Bopped Bugs Bunny?", the Oscar win of Knighty Knight Bugs is a major plot point. Mirroring the real-life loss of the Terrytoons short at the Academy Awards, a character named Sappy "Slaphappy" Stanley (a parody of "Silly" Sidney, here voiced by Jonathan Winters) was defeated for the Shloscar Award. As a result, Stanley scorned the U.S. film industry. He relocated to France, where despite becoming a national star, he still nursed a bitter grudge against Bugs, culminating in the episode's plot.

== Home media ==
This cartoon is featured uncut on Disc 1 of the Looney Tunes Golden Collection: Volume 4 DVD set, Disc 1 of the Warner Bros. Home Entertainment Academy Awards Animation Collection DVD set, Disc 1 of The Essential Bugs Bunny DVD set, Disc 1 of the Looney Tunes Platinum Collection: Volume 3 Blu-ray and DVD sets, and Disc 3 of the Bugs Bunny 80th Anniversary Collection Blu-ray set.

== Attractions ==
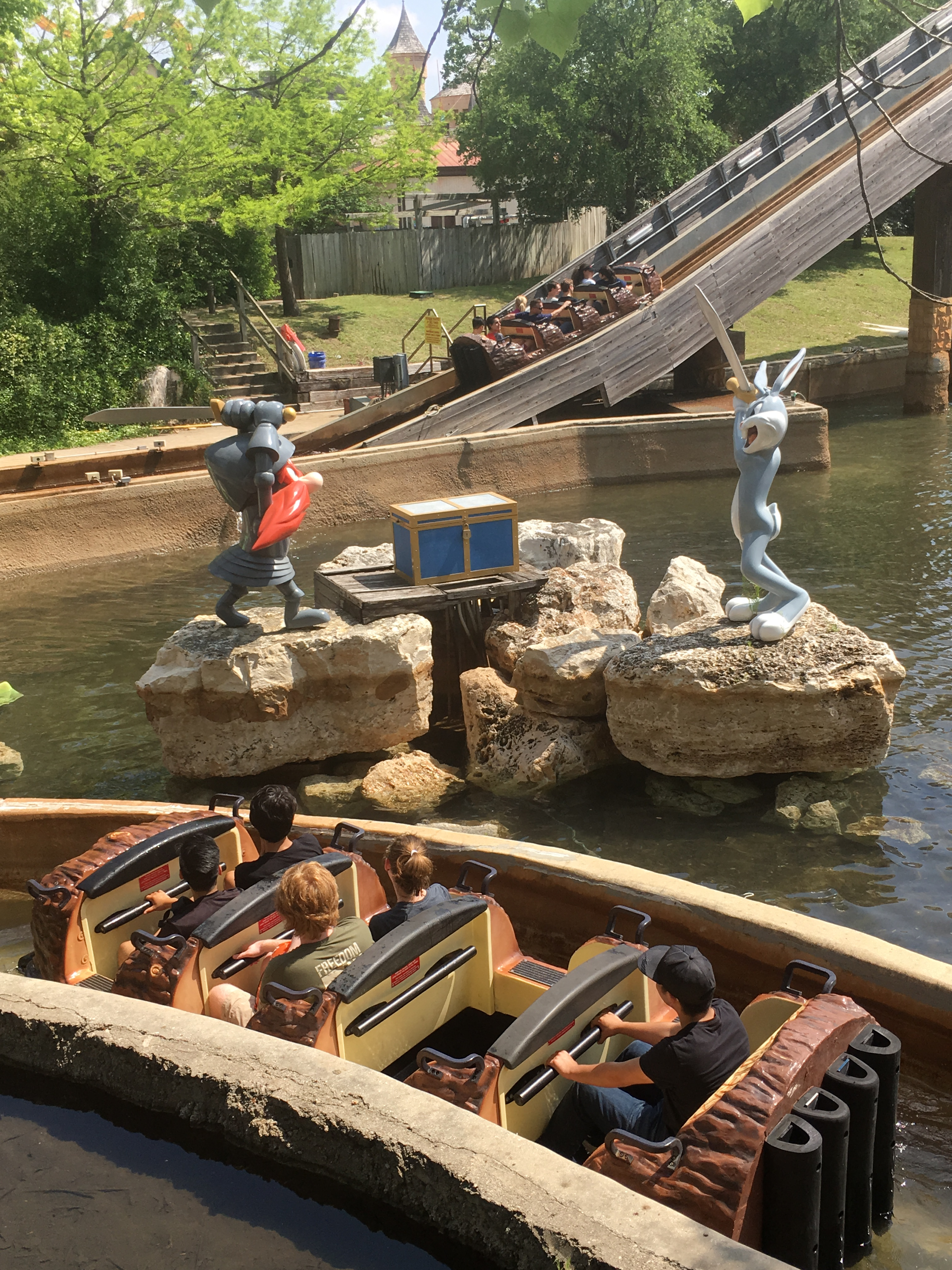
Bugs' White Water Rapids at Six Flags Fiesta Texas

Bugs' White Water Rapids is a Hopkins Rides log flume themed to Knighty Knight Bugs that opened in 1998 at Six Flags Fiesta Texas in San Antonio, Texas.

== See also ==
- List of Bugs Bunny cartoons
- List of Yosemite Sam cartoons

Preceded by Now Hare This	Bugs Bunny Cartoons; 1958	Succeeded by Pre-Hysterical Hare
