= Hopkins Rides =

American amusement ride manufacturer

- Industry: Manufacturing
- Predecessor: O.D. Hopkins Associates, Inc.
- Founded: 1962
- Founder: O.D. Hopkins
- Defunct: 1992
- Successor: Hopkins Rides, Inc.
- Headquarters: Palm City, Florida, United States
- Area served: Worldwide
- Products: Amusement rides, roller coasters
- Website: www.whitewaterwest.com

Hopkins Rides was an amusement ride manufacturer located in Palm City, Florida, United States. Founded in 1962, the company was primarily involved in producing water rides, although for a brief time, it also built and designed seven roller coasters. They also helped reprofile and retrack two Arrow Dynamics coasters. Hopkins Rides was acquired by Canadian company WhiteWater West Industries in 2012.

== History ==
In 1962 O.D. Hopkins incorporated Hopkins Engineering of Contoocook, New Hampshire and started installing ski lifts for J.A. Roebling & Sons of Trenton, New Jersey. In 1965, Hopkins purchased the ski lift division and all the related assets from Roebling & Sons. Soon afterwards a competitor, Universal Design Ltd., discontinued manufacturing Sky Rides, and their customers turned to Hopkins Engineering for parts. Hopkins' first customer in the amusement business was Charles Wood of Storytown USA.

In 1971, the name of the company was changed to O.D. Hopkins Associates Inc. In 1979, Hopkins was approached by Paul Roads, owner of Wonderland Park (Texas), to build a reasonably-priced log flume for his park. The success of that project started Hopkins in the water ride manufacturing business. The aerial ropeway/sky ride division was spun off to Skyfair, Inc. on January 1, 1986.

In November, 2001, O.D. Hopkins and Associates Inc. filed for bankruptcy protection. The company reorganized and emerged as Hopkins Rides, LLC in May 2002, and was for a brief time in partnership with Reverchon Industries of France.

In August 2012 water slide manufacturer WhiteWater West acquired assets and intellectual property from Hopkins Rides, LLC. Although WhiteWater Attractions has adopted the Hopkins Rides technology, it is not a parent company to Hopkins Rides, LLC and the companies operate independently. WhiteWater sells its products under the Water Rides brand.

== Manufacturing ==
The company originally manufactured Sky Rides, but in the 1980s, with the increase in popularity of their water-based attractions, those rides became the company's primary product. In addition to the water-based attractions, Hopkins built seven roller coasters from 1985 to 1996. They also occasionally made other amusement ride types such as a SkyGlider, tube slides, and a water jet ride known as an Aqua Drag. Santa's Village still operates its SkyGlider, and Wonderland Park still operates its Aqua Drag and SkyGlider in addition to its other Hopkins rides.

Hopkins also re-fabricated portions of track on two Arrow Dynamics-built coasters: Dahlonega Mine Train at Six Flags Over Georgia received 1,400 feet of new track and supports in 1986 and Canobie Corkscrew at Canobie Lake Park received new track and supports in 1990.

The company currently focuses only on water ride attractions:

- Shoot the Chute rides
- Flumes and larger capacity Super Flumes
- River Raft ride
- Water Transportation Systems

== List of roller coasters ==
As of 2019, Hopkins Rides has built 7 roller coasters around the world.

Name	Model	Park	Country	Opened	Status	Ref
Texas Tornado	Looping Coaster	Wonderland Amusement Park	United States	1985	Operating	
Polar Coaster	Junior Coaster	Story Land	United States	1987	Operating	
Cliff Hanger; Formerly Red Devil	Looping Coaster	Ghost Town Village	United States	1988	Closed	
Dragon	Looping Coaster	Adventureland	United States	1990	Removed	
Desert Storm	Looping Coaster	Castles N' Coasters	United States	1992	Operating	
Patriot	Junior Coaster	Castles N' Coasters	United States	1992	Operating	
New Wild Mouse Coaster	Wild Mouse	Misaki Park	Japan	1996	Closed	

== List of other attractions ==
=== Flumes ===
Unless otherwise specified, all flumes feature at least one lift and a drop into a splash pool.

Opened	Name	Park	Notes	Status
1980	Big Splash Log Flume	Wonderland Park	Elevated section	Operating
1981	Log Flume	Hamel's Amusement Park		Defunct
1981	Log Flume	Camden Park	2 drops	Operating
1981	Sawmill River	Crystal Beach	2 drops, elevated section	Defunct
1982	Big Splash log flume	Western Playland	Elevated section	Defunct
1982	Policy Pond	Canobie Lake Park	2 drops	Operating
1983	Yule Log Flume	Santa's Village		Operating
1983	Mystery River Log Flume	Frontier City		Operating
1984	Log Flume	Seabreeze		Operating
1984	Log Flume	Myrtle Beach Pavilion	2 drops, elevated section	Defunct
1984	Frightful Falls	Holiday World		Operating
1984	Thunder Falls Log Flume	Funtown		Operating
1985	Rocky Mountain Rapids	Cliff's Amusement Park	Elevated section	Operating
1985	Zoom Phloom	Morey's Piers	2 drops, elevated section	Operating
1985	Log Jam	Joyland Park		Defunct (Note: Park closed in 2006, site is currently abandoned.)
1989	Splash Mountain	Disneyland	5 drops, elevated sections	Defunct
1989	Log Flume	Great Basin Adventure at Rancho San Rafael		Closed (Note: Park is open to the public but the rides do not operate due to lack of funds.)
1989	Log Ride	Castle Amusement Park	2 drops, elevated section	Operating
1990	Flume	Knoebels Amusement Resort	2 drops, elevated section	Operating
1991	Splashdown	Castles N' Coasters	2 drops, elevated section	Operating
August 11, 1992	Log Chute	Nickelodeon Universe	2 drops, elevated section	Operating
1992	Canyon Falls Log Flume	Wonderland Pier	Elevated section	Defunct
1992	Log Jammer	Kiddieland Amusement Park	Elevated section	Moved (Note: Flume was purchased by Little Amerricka, currently in storage.)
1993	Splash	Bosque Magico		Operating
1993	Bamboo Chutes	Story Land	Elevated section	Operating
1993	Log Flume	Playland	2 drops	Operating
1994	Timber Wolf Howling Log Ride	Timber Falls	2 drops, elevated section	Operating
1995	Jungle Log Jam	Enchanted Kingdom	2 drops, elevated section	Operating
1995	Menhir Express	Parc Astérix	2 drops, elevated section	Operating
1996	Thunder River	Waldameer & Water World	2 drops, elevated section	Operating
1995	Log Flume	Wonderland Family Fun Park (Dubai)		Operating
1996		Bali Festival Park	2 drops	Closed (Note: Park closed in 2000, site is currently abandoned.)
1998	Flume Ride	Qingdao International Beer City	2 drops	Defunct
1998	Monkey Falls	Ratanga Junction	3 drops, elevated section	Defunct
1999	Twin Mercury	Space World	3 drops, elevated section	Defunct
1999	Log Flume	Family Kingdom	2 drops	Operating
2000	Ozarka Splash	Jazzland/Six Flags New Orleans	2 drops, elevated section	Closed (Note: Park closed in 2005, site is currently abandoned.)
2000	Old No. 2 Logging Company	Magic Springs	2 drops	Operating
2001	Legend of the Labyrinth	Lagunasia Park	2 drops	Operating
2001	Flume	Tokyo Dome	2 drops, elevated section	Operating
2001	Race for Your Life Charlie Brown	Kings Island	Rebuild of 1968 Arrow flume	Operating

=== Shoot the Chute rides ===
Opening Date	Name	Park	Country	Height	Status
1986	Splashwater Falls	Six Flags Great America	United States	50 feet (15 m)	Defunct
1986	Splashwater Falls	Six Flags Over Georgia	United States	50 feet (15 m)	Defunct
1987	Aquaman	Six Flags Over Texas	United States	50 feet (15 m)	Defunct
1987	Splashwater Falls	Six Flags Great Adventure	United States	50 feet (15 m)	Defunct
March 1988	Whitewater Falls	Carowinds	United States	50 feet (15 m)	Defunct
1989	Timberwolf Falls	Canada's Wonderland	Canada	50 feet (15 m)	Operating
May 1991	Tidal Wave	Six Flags St. Louis	United States	50 feet (15 m)	Defunct
1992	Water Rollercoaster – Splash	Duinrell	Netherlands	50 feet (15 m)	Operating
1992	The Wave	Valleyfair	United States	50 feet (15 m)	Operating
1992	Tidal Wave	Misaki Park	Japan	50 feet (15 m)	Operating
1993	Shipwreck Falls	Six Flags America	United States	50 feet (15 m)	Defunct
1993	Pittsburg Plunge	Kennywood	United States	50 feet (15 m)	Operating
1993	Splash	Mitsui Greenland	Japan	50 feet (15 m)	Operating
1993	Splash	Reino Aventura/Six Flags México	Mexico	50 feet (15 m)	Operating
1994	Tidal Force	Hersheypark	United States	100 feet (30 m)	Defunct
1994	Mile High Falls	Kentucky Kingdom	United States	90 feet (27 m)	Operating
1994	Super Splash	Dream World	Thailand	50 feet (15 m)	Operating
1994	Adventure Falls	Michigan's Adventure	United States	50 feet (15 m)	Operating
1994	Splash Boat	Fuji-Q Highland	Japan	100 feet (30 m)	Defunct
1994	Shoot the Chute	Nagashima Spa Land	Japan	100 feet (30 m)	Operating
1997	Shipwreck Falls	Elitch Gardens Theme Park	United States	50 feet (15 m)	Operating
1997	Skloosh!	Knoebels Amusement Resort	United States	50 feet (15 m)	Operating
1998	Boston Tea Party	Canobie Lake Park	United States	50 feet (15 m)	Operating
May 29, 1999	Flash Flood	Noah's Ark Water Park	United States	50 feet (15 m)	Operating
1999	Niagara; 2017 - Eldorado Falls	Mirabilandia	Italy	100 feet (30 m)	Operating
April 7, 2000	Tidal Wave	Thorpe Park	United Kingdom	85.8 feet (26 m)	Operating
2000	Tsunami	Western Playland	United States	50 feet (15 m)	Operating
2000	Shoot the Chute (Note: Smaller ride with 12-passenger boats and narrower boat channel)	Wonderland Park (Texas)	United States	50 feet (15 m)	Operating
2000	Shipwreck Falls	Geauga Lake	United States	50 feet (15 m)	Relocated to Celebration City
2001	Airship Surfing	Guilin Merryland Theme Park	China	50 feet (15 m)	Operating
2001	Playland Plunge (Note: Smaller ride with 12-passenger boats and narrower boat channel)	Playland (New York)	United States	50 feet (15 m)	Operating
2005	Spillway Splashout	Jazzland	United States	50 feet (15 m)	Closed
2008	Roaring Falls	Celebration City	United States	50 feet (15 m)	Closed
May 24, 2012	Pirate Reef	Legoland California	United States	25 feet (8 m)	Operating
2012	Submarine Splash	Gyeongju World/Kyongju World	South Korea	Unknown	Operating
Unknown	Poseidon 30	Kijima Kogen	Japan	100 feet (30 m)	Operating

=== River Raft rides ===
Opened	Name	Park	Notes	Status
1988	Rattlesnake River Raft Ride	Wonderland Park	6-passenger rafts	Operating
1989	Dr. Geyser's Remarkable Raft Ride	Story Land	6-passenger rafts	Operating
1990	Grand Canyon	Dream World	8-passenger rafts	Operating
1990	Raging Rapids	Holiday World	8-passenger rafts	Closed
1990	Renegade Rapids	Frontier City	8-passenger rafts	Operating
1993	Arung Jeram	Dunia Fantasi	6-passenger rafts	Operating
1993	Hydro Surge	Myrtle Beach Pavilion	6-passenger rafts	Defunct
1994	Renegade Rapids	Six Flags America	8-passenger rafts	Closed
1995	Disaster Canyon	Elitch Gardens	8-passenger rafts	Operating
1995	Río Rápido	Bosque Magico	8-passenger rafts	Operating
1996	Rio Grande Rapids	Enchanted Kingdom	8-passenger rafts	Operating
1996	Thunder River	Lake Compounce	8-passenger rafts	Operating
1997	Airship Surfing	Guilin Merryland Resort	8-passenger rafts	Operating
1998	River Rafting Ride	Wonderland (Dubai)	8-passenger rafts	Operating
1998	Rapids Raft Ride	Happy Valley, Shenzhen	8-passenger rafts	Operating
1998		Qingdao International Beer City	8-passenger rafts	Operating
1999	Blizzard River	Six Flags New England	8-passenger rafts	Operating
1998	Wild River Canyon	Lihpao Land	8-passenger rafts	Operating
		Haikou Tropical Ocean World	8-passenger rafts	Operating
	Grand Canyon Adventure	Gyeongju World/Kyongju World	8-passenger rafts	Operating

=== Super Flumes ===
Opened	Name	Park	Notes	Status
1998	Log Flume	Hamanako Pal Pal, Japan		Operating
April 1998	Daredevil Falls	Dollywood		Operating
1998	Bugs' White Water Rapids	Six Flags Fiesta Texas		Operating
December 26, 1998	Wild West Falls Adventure Ride	Warner Bros. Movie World		Operating
1999	Wild-Crazy Flume	Lihpao Land, Taiwan		Operating
2016	Thunder Falls	Everland, South Korea		Operating
