= Castles N' Coasters =

Amusement park in Phoenix, Arizona

Castles ~N~ Coasters
- Previously known as Golf n' Stuff (1976-1992)
- Interactive map of Castles ~N~ Coasters
- Location: 9445 North Metro Parkway East, Phoenix, Arizona, U.S.
- Coordinates: 33.5723°N 112.1188°W
- Status: Operating
- Public transit: Metro Parkway
- Opened: 1976
- General manager: Darsey Grantham
- Slogan: Arizona's Finest Family Fun and Thrill Park
- Attendance: 20,000 annually
- Area: ~14 acres

Attractions
- Total: 14
- Roller coasters: 2
- Water rides: 2
- Website: Official website

Castles N' Coasters is an amusement park and family amusement center located in Phoenix, Arizona. The approximately 14-acre (57,000 m^{2}) park features four outdoor 18-hole miniature golf courses, several rides, and an indoor video game arcade. The park was built in 1976, and is designed in a Middle-Eastern motif though other eras are featured such as the Wild West-themed miniature golf course and log flume ride.

Other attractions includes a go-kart track, bumper cars, bumper boats, 2 roller coasters called Patriot and Desert Storm, some thrill rides including Magic Carpet, Sea Dragon, Free Fall and Sky Diver drop rides, and a log flume called Splashdown.

== History ==
In 1976, the entertainment park originally opened under the name "Golf N' Stuff". It later turned into "Castles N' Coasters" in December 1991 after adding its Ride Park. Also expanding to 14 acres which brought two roller coasters, Desert Storm and Patriot, as well as a multilevel arcade.

The bumper boats were originally batting cages.

== Rides and attractions ==
Roller coasters

Name	Year opened	Manufacturer	Description
Desert Storm	1992	Hopkins Rides	A looping roller coaster that uses a simple lap bar restraint. It is one of the park's main attractions and has two loops. Manufactured by Hopkins.
Patriot	1992	Hopkins Rides	A mild roller coaster that is colored red, white and blue as its name suggests. It is centered around a large American flag and does two circuits. Manufactured by Hopkins.

Amusement rides

Name	Year opened	Manufacturer	Model	Description
Splashdown	1991	Hopkins Rides	Log Flume	Features a logging town, tunnel, waterfalls, fountains, squirting African Elephant statues, native huts, and two large drops. The first drop measure 10 feet and the second drop measures 30 feet.
Skydiver	2008	Larson	Super Shot	A 120 foot tall free-fall drop tower.
Free Fall	2012	Moser	Spring Ride 5+5	A smaller version of Sky Diver (above).
Sea Dragon	2012	Chance	Spring Ride 5+5	A large swinging Viking ship.
Ram Rods	2000	Majestic	Bumper Cars	Riders steer their cars in any direction across the metal rectangular floor bumping other cars out of their way.
Magic Carpet	2003	Preston & Barbieri	Music Express	A quick circular ride that travels forward and backward clockwise around an undulating track and goes through Aladdin's Castle.
Carousel	1970		Carousel	Features 60 hand painted horses and circus animals
Flying Bugs & Spinning Tops	2002	Zamperla		Two kiddie rides located near the queue line for Desert Storm.
Dixie Jr. Wheel	1992		Miniature Ferris Wheel	

- Li'l Indy is a go-cart track that passes under the Desert Storm roller coaster (above).
- Bumper Boats
- Arcades
- Miniature Golf features four courses. Each have trick shots, multiple themes, and many water features.

== Incidents ==
On May 1, 2005, eleven people were left stranded for nearly three hours after a free fall ride malfunctioned. Reports indicate that the floorless, four-sided passenger cabin jerked as it ascended the tower. The cabin, guided by cables, normally drops to the bottom of the 120-foot-tall tower and comes to a stop, however when it reached the halfway point on its ascent, it made loud screeching noises and came to a sudden halt. It took firefighters nearly three hours to rescue the riders, who were locked in their seats about 30 feet above the ground.

The park's manager says that the ride would be closed until investigators determined what caused the malfunction.

On March 30, 2015, two young boys suffered burns when the bumper boat they were in caught fire.

On November 28, 2015, a twelve-year-old boy named Dominick Leal was seriously injured after falling from the park’s Splashdown attraction after standing during the ride, and required immediate emergency brain surgery.

On May 15, 2021, fire crews rescued 22 people that were stuck on the Desert Storm roller coaster. Investigators said the cars on the coaster stalled and the riders were stuck about 20 feet up on a horizontal loop. A long bolt broke and scraped against the wheel railing where the coaster eventually ground to a halt.

On November 24, 2024, a man jumped out of the Desert Storm roller coaster onto the staircase catwalk as the train ascended the lift hill. According to the man, his lap bar restraint came loose, prompting him to act quickly before the train plunged into the ride's first drop.
