= Golf N' Stuff =

American amusement park and miniature golf company

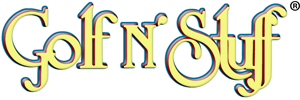

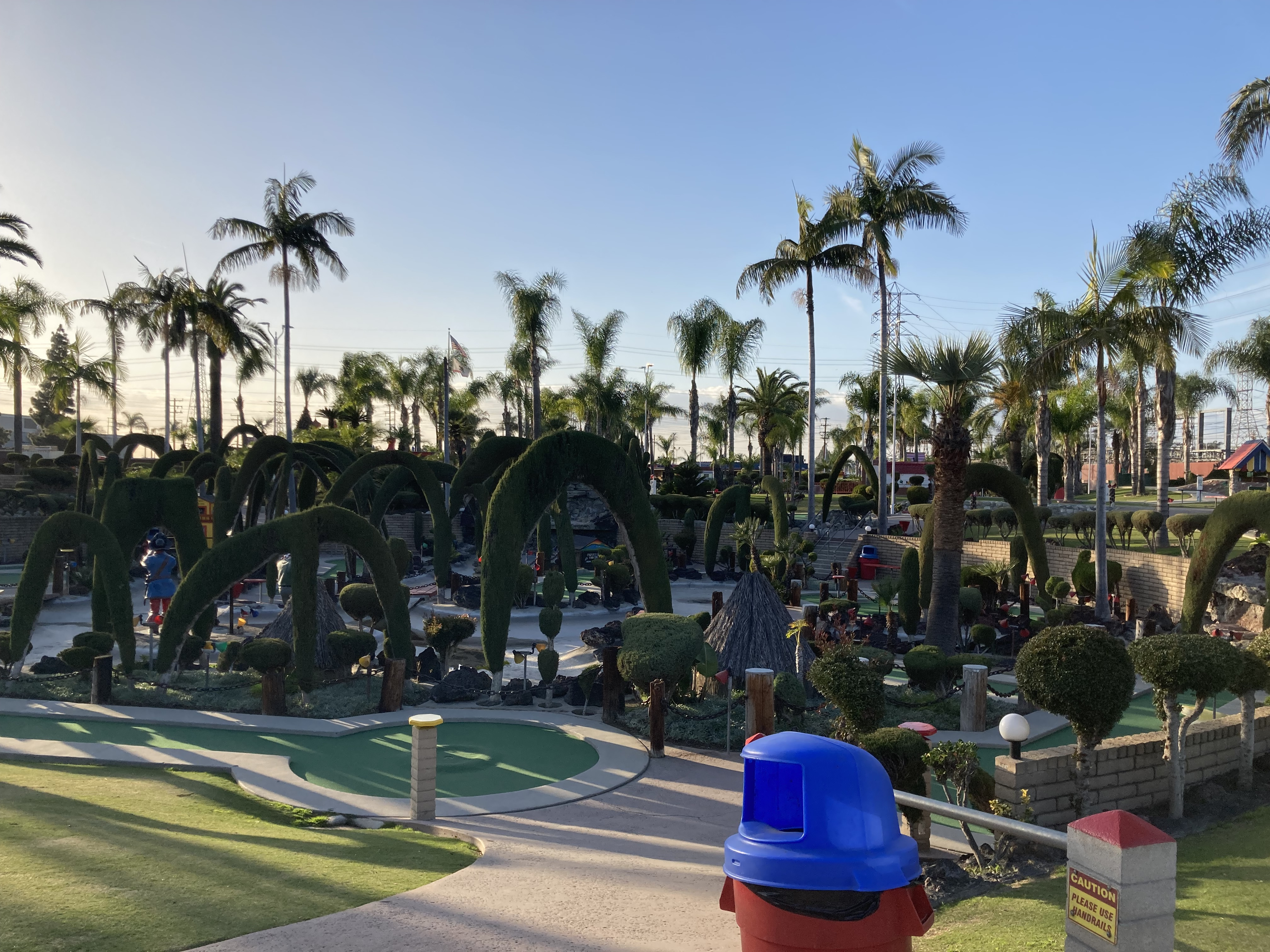
- The Norwalk, California location in 2025
- Formerly: Golf N' Things
- Company type: Private
- Industry: Family entertainment center
- Founded: 1969
- Number of locations: 3 (2023)
- Area served: Arizona; California
- Owner: George Brimhall
- Website: golfnstuff.com

Golf N' Stuff is an American brand of three family entertainment amusement parks and miniature golf courses located in the Southwestern United States cities of Norwalk, Ventura, and Tucson. It has a sister park in Phoenix, Castles N' Coasters. It has an estimated million visitors each year.

== History ==
The first Golf N' Stuff was opened in Norwalk, in 1969. The second Golf N' Stuff was opened in Ventura on August 10, 1974. The Golf N' Stuff in Tucson opened as Golf N' Things in 1976, with a medieval theme. A fourth location opened in Phoenix also in 1976, which was rebranded as Castles N' Coasters in 1991 following the addition of amusement rides. After the company was bought in 1979, its name was changed to its current one.

The 29-year-old Timothy Roy broke the treehouse-sitting record at Golf N' Stuff Norwalk by sitting in a prebuilt 6 by 8 ft (1.8 by 2.4 m) treehouse in the park for 431 days, two hours, and thirty minutes between July 4, 1982, and September 8, 1983. The treehouse was 15 ft (4.6 m) above the ground and contained a sink and working toilet. Local restaurants provided the unemployed actor with food in the hope of publicity, and the many visitors also offered company and aid. The previous record, 182 days in 1978 by Glen Woodrich, was also set in the same treehouse.

During the COVID-19 pandemic, guests were required to constantly wear face masks, and half the arcade games were shut off. Staff were required to clean the games and restrooms hourly.

== Attractions ==
The Norwalk location has four 18-hole miniature golf courses, with varying obstacles. There is no general theme throughout the park. Some holes contain alternate paths that may result in an automatic hole in one. It contains a Disk'O, go-karts, bumper boats, and a small train. It also contains an arcade with over 100 games and a snack bar, as no outside food is allowed. In Ventura, 80's music plays continuously, and there are only two courses. It still has go-karts, an arcade, and bumper boats, but also contains bumper cars. The Tucson location is the same, but instead of bumper cars, it has laser tag and batting cages. Birthday parties can be scheduled throughout all parks, and are popular there.

== In popular culture ==
Golf N' Stuff's Norwalk location is known for being the site of both a scene in The Karate Kid and Cobra Kai. Midnight Madness, known for being the debut of Michael J. Fox, was filmed here, along with the music videos "Shoots and Ladders" by Korn, "Girlfriend" by Avril Lavigne, and "Person of Interest" by Rebecca Black. The Norwalk location was also featured in a fifth season episode of the television show CHiPs entitled "The Killer Indy".

In The Karate Kid, the golf course is the site of Daniel LaRusso and Ali Mills' first date, while in Cobra Kai, the season one episode "All Valley," Miguel takes Sam to the course. While the scene in The Karate Kid was filmed onsite, the one in Cobra Kai was actually filmed in Fun Spot America – Atlanta, in Georgia.
