= O.D. Hopkins =

Amusement ride manufacturer (1926–2010)

- Born: 1926; Beijing, China
- Died: April 3, 2010 (aged 83–84)
- Known for: Hopkins Rides
- Spouse: Hope Smith

O.D. Hopkins (1926, Beijing–April 3, 2010) was the founder of the amusement ride manufacturing firm O.D. Hopkins Associates Inc. Hopkins' family moved from Beijing to New Jersey when he was two years old. He first worked as a farmer, then in logging and road and bridge contracting, then in pre-poured concrete].

Hopkins incorporated Hopkins Engineering in 1962 and from 1962 to 1964 operated as a general contractor installing ski lifts for J.A. Roebling & Sons of Trenton, New Jersey. In 1965 Hopkins purchased the ski lift division and all the related assets from Roebling & Sons. Business improved after a competitor, Universal Design Ltd., discontinued manufacturing Sky Rides, and their customers turned to Hopkins Engineering for parts. Hopkins' first customer in the amusement business was Charles Wood of Storytown USA who owned a Universal Design ski lift and contracted Hopkins to provide parts and maintenance. In 1969 Hopkins sold his first Sky Glider chairlift to Paragon Park in Massachusetts. In 1971 Hopkins changed the name of his company to O.D. Hopkins Associates Inc.

O.D. Hopkins had a long business relationship and friendship with Paul Roads of Wonderland Park (Texas), which currently operates eight Hopkins rides, many of them prototypes, including Hopkins' first flume, first Sky Rider (monorail), first Rapids Ride, and first Roller Coaster.

Hopkins retired in 1991.
