= Bugs' White Water Rapids =

Flume ride at Six Flags Fiesta Texas

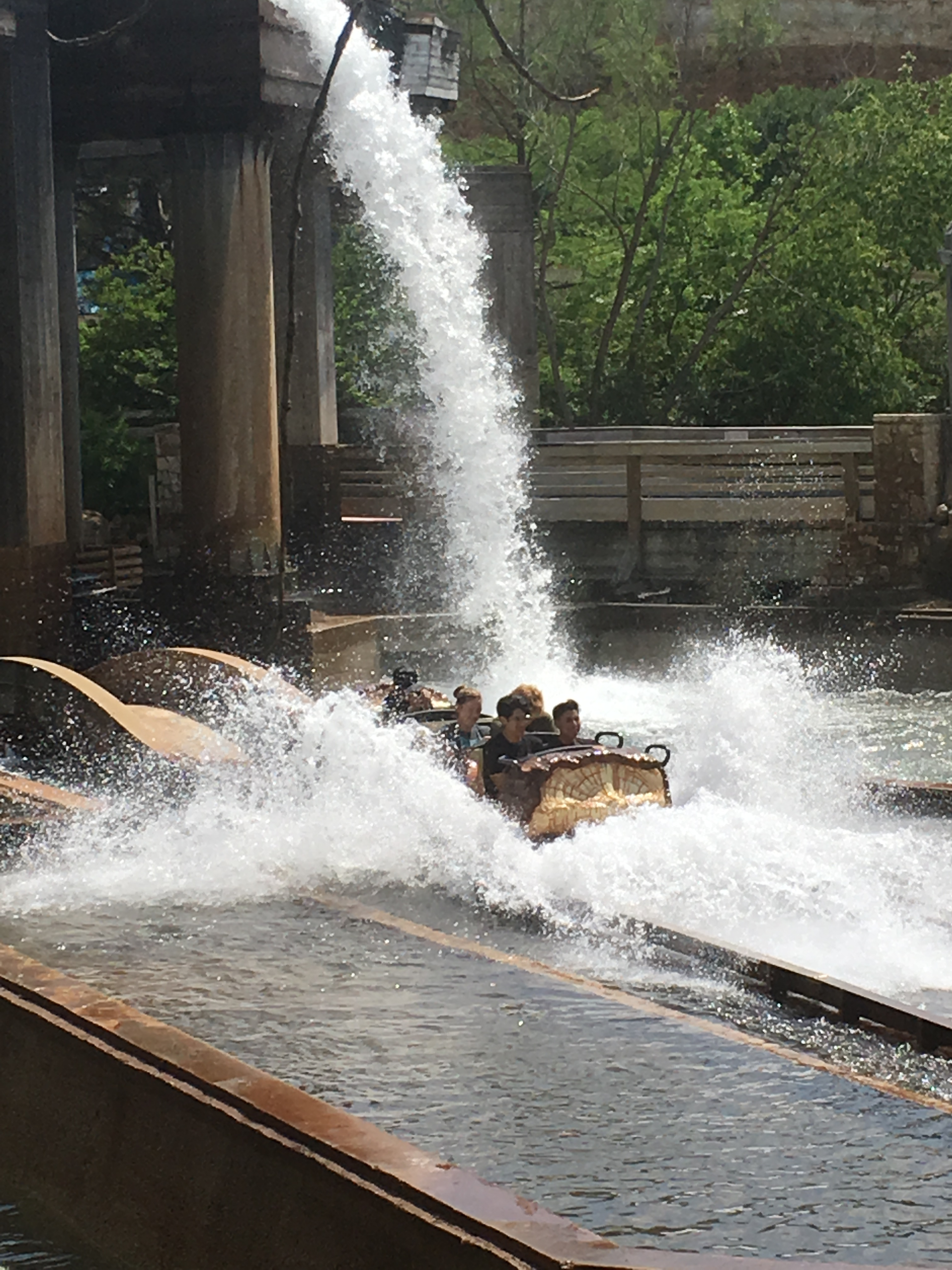

Six Flags Fiesta Texas
- Area: Spassburg
- Status: Operating
- Opening date: 1998

General statistics
- Type: Log flume
- Manufacturer: Hopkins Rides
- Lift system: 2 chain lift hills
- Height: 30 ft (9.1 m)
- Duration: 4:40
- Boats: Several boats. Riders are arranged 2 across in 4 rows for a total of 8 riders per boat.
- Restraint style: None
- Height restriction: 36 in (91 cm)
- Theme: Knighty Knight Bugs
- Fast Lane available

Bugs' White Water Rapids is a flume ride located in the Spassburg section at Six Flags Fiesta Texas in San Antonio, Texas, since 1998.

== General information ==
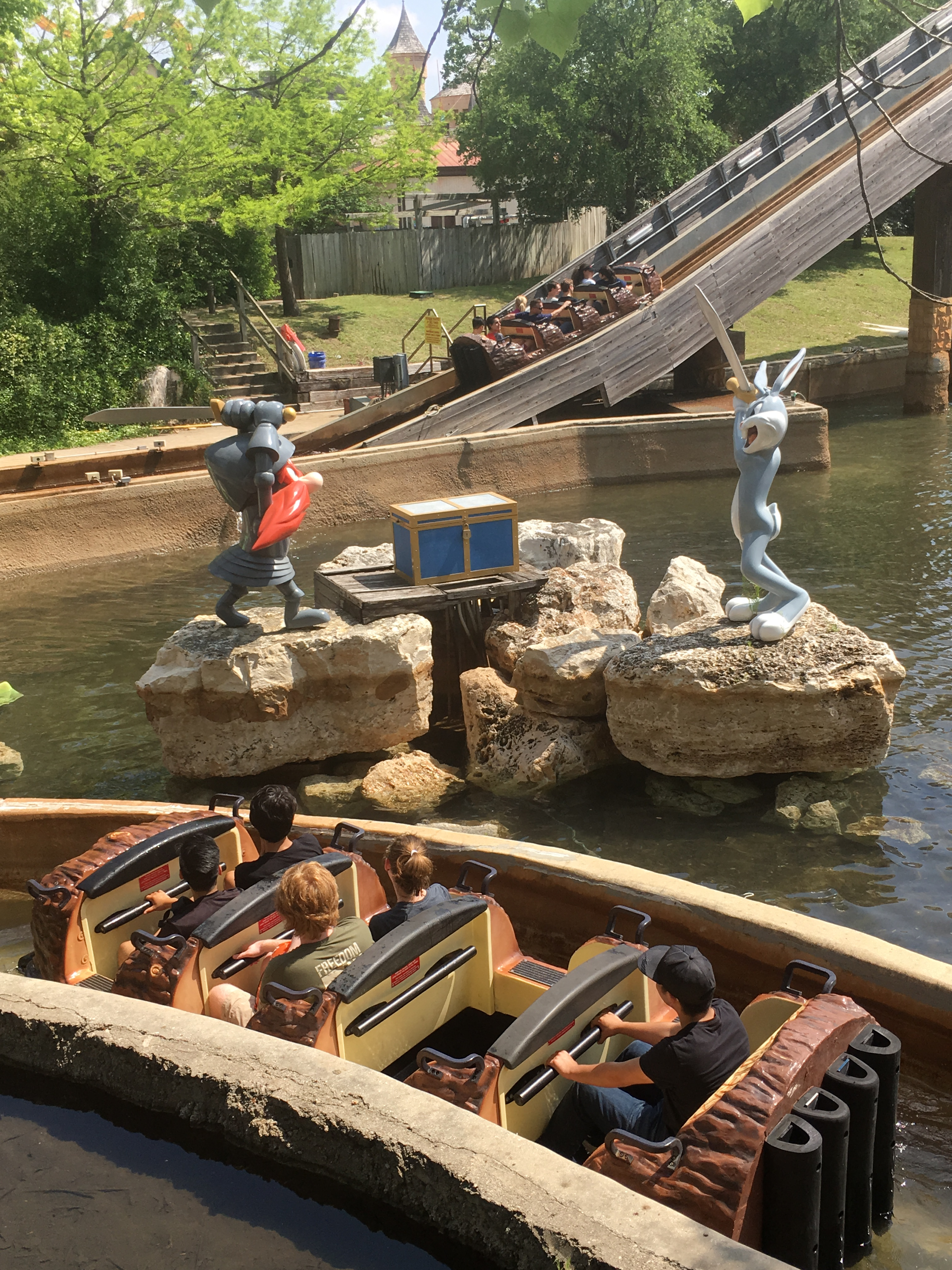
Bugs Bunny and Yosemite Sam theming on the ride

Bugs' White Water Rapids has two lift hills and two drops. The ride is the longest operating water ride in the park each season, operating from opening day through Fright Fest and Holiday in the Park.

The ride was manufactured by Hopkins Rides and constructed by Martin & Vleminckx.

== Ride ==
Once riders get on Bugs' White Water Rapids, the flume takes a right coming out of the station where the ride begins traveling towards the first lift hill. After the small first drop, then flume makes an almost complete circle to the right, and then takes you up to the second tallest section of the ride. Once at the second highest part of the ride, you dip down and curve through turns, back and forth along DC Universe and over the ride below it. Then the flume will take you to the highest part of the ride at 30-foot (9.1 m). Once at the top, you go straight down to the water with a big splash. After the big drop, the boat will travel through more turns until it reaches back to the station, and then riders can depart.

== Theme ==
Bugs' White Water Rapids is themed to the famous Looney Tunes character Bugs Bunny and also Yosemite Sam. While riding the flume, it tells the story of the Academy Award winner, 1958 Looney Tunes cartoon Knighty Knight Bugs by the ride Medieval scenery. The station of the ride and the queue is located inside the "Black Knight's Castle" where guests experience the antics of Bugs Bunny, the court jester, as he is commissioned to use his wits and reclaim the Singing Sword.

== See also ==
- Hopkins Rides
- Knighty Knight Bugs
