= Santa's Village (Jefferson, New Hampshire) =

Christmas-themed amusement park in US

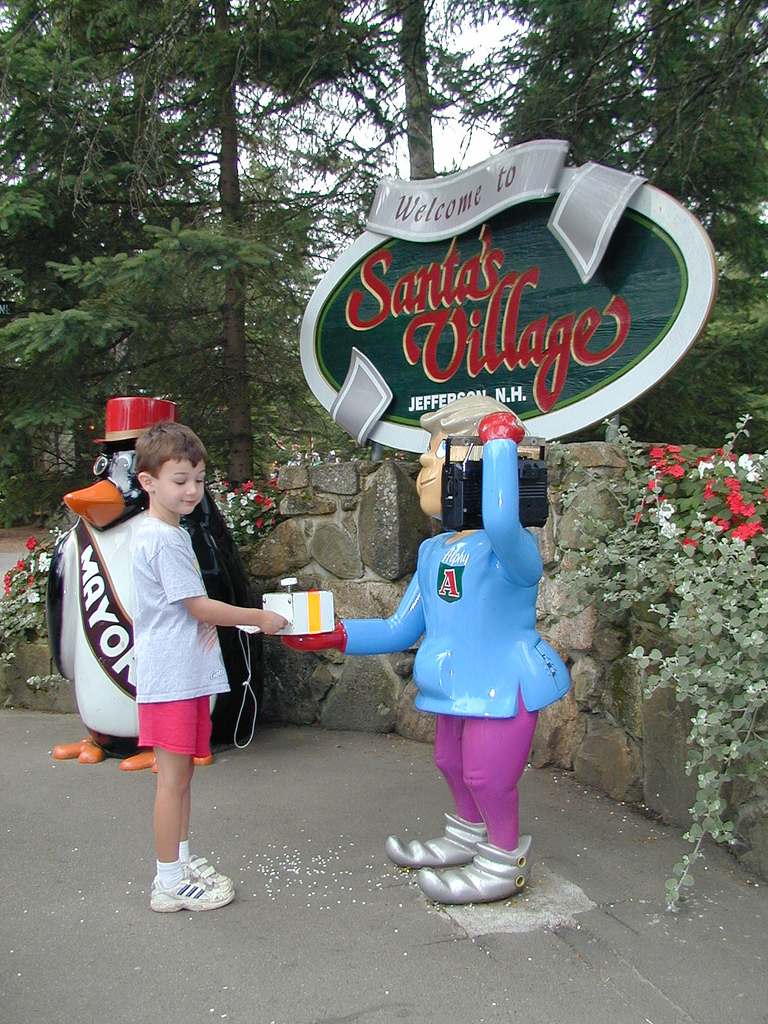
- A welcome sign at Santa's Village
- Interactive map of Santa's Village
- Location: Jefferson, New Hampshire, New Hampshire, USA
- Coordinates: 44°25′35″N 71°29′45″W
- Status: Operating
- Opened: June 21, 1953
- Owner: Santa's Village, Inc.
- Theme: Christmas
- Operating season: May through December

Attractions
- Total: 23
- Roller coasters: 2
- Water rides: 4 including Ho Ho H2O Water Park
- Website: www.santasvillage.com

Santa's Village is a Christmas-themed amusement park located in Jefferson, New Hampshire.

Most of the 23 rides have Christmas or winter-themed names, such as "Midnight Flyer" and "The Great Humbug Adventure". The rides are designed for families with children under age 13. There are also three theatres, two of which present live shows and a third that features a 3-D film called A Tinkerdoodle Christmas. Visitors can visit Santa's home, sit in his rocking chair, and have a picture taken with Santa.

== History ==
Santa's Village was the brainchild of Normand and Cecile Dubois who, in the early 1950s, wanted to create something novel to their region. Seeing deer crossing the road sparked Norman's belief that the North Country in New Hampshire would serve well as Santa and his reindeers' home. On Father's Day, in 1953, the family amusement park was opened for the first time to the general public. In its first year, the park had pony rides and showcased Francis the Famous Mule in a mule performance. The amusement park staff frequently gave her oats from a whiskey bottle to wheedle her to move. The Duboises also invited Santa Claus to the park; he was accompanied by real reindeer and numerous elves. The park was later enlarged to include a "Santa Schoolhouse", a "Blacksmith Shop", "Santa's Workshop" and a chapel. In 1955, the park was open from June to October.

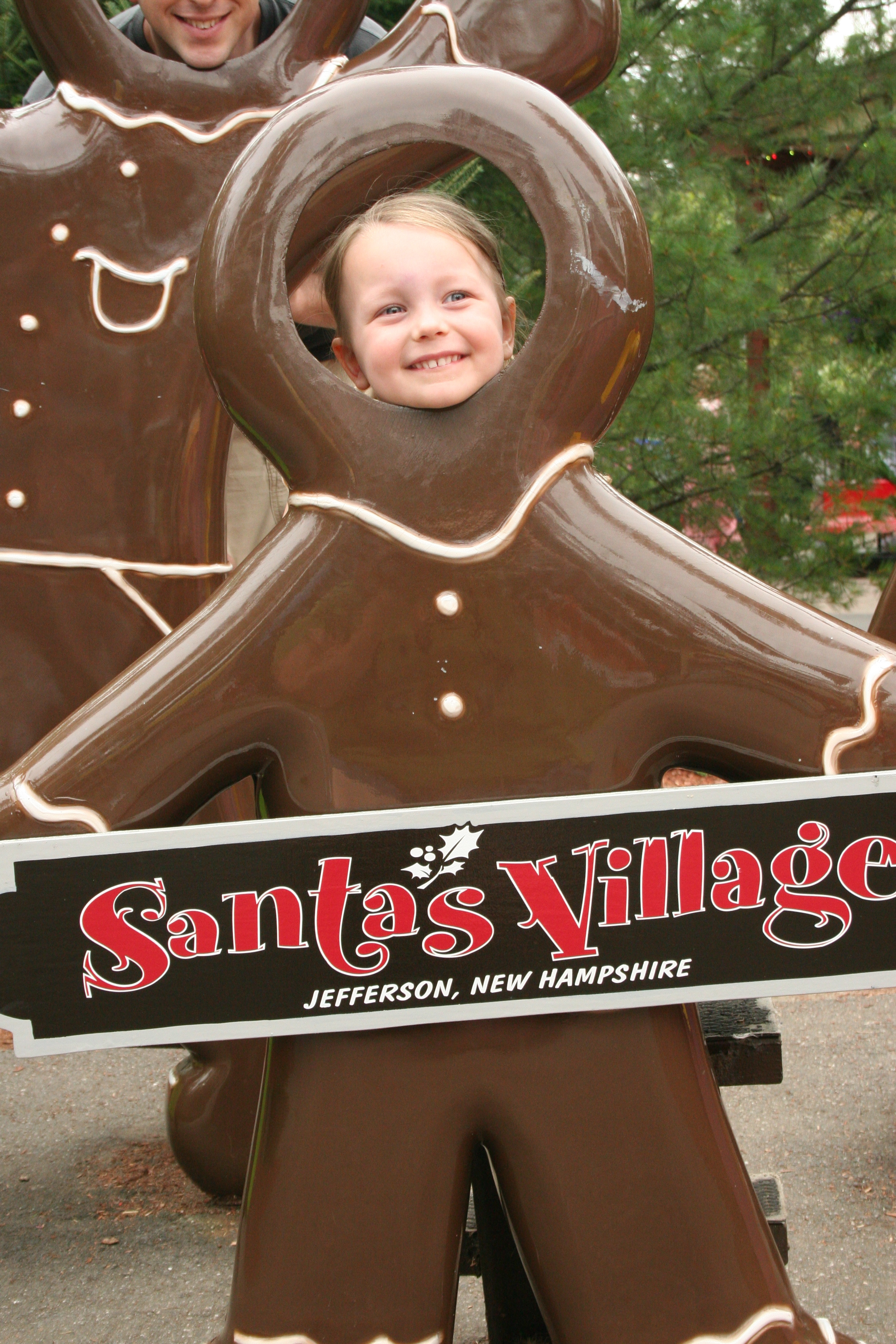
A child poses for a picture through the head of a gingerbread man

By 1969, the park also had playgrounds, restaurants, and a "Jingle Jamboree". The Dubois family added a dancing chicken and rabbit performance to the park's activities. By 1974, the Dubois' son-in-law, Michael Gaynor, took over the park's management after the couple retired. The admission for people over four years old in 1974 was $3. Peggy Newland of The Nashua Telegraph wrote in 2010 that "[b]y the 1980s, the park had grown to a 'real' amusement park". The park was further expanded, with a "Yule Log Flume" that glided down a Christmas-themed river, carrying people around the park. Macaws performed in the park, roller-skating around the stage and balancing bikes on a tightrope.

In 1986, Jack Barth of Spy wrote that Santa's Village has a "strange arrangement", in that to take pictures, people poke their heads out of a cake made of plaster. The grandchildren of Normand and Cecile Dubois manage the park. They added a "Polar Theater" with 3D shows that include elves that dance and a tree that sings, as well as "Skyways Sleighs", which transport people through the sky to different parts of the park.

Near the park's duck pond is a life-size Nativity scene. The park also has a wishing well, where children can make a wish and toss coins in. The money from the wishing well is given to marginalized children through the form of Christmas gifts. In the first year of the village, more than $1000 from the well was used to buy gifts for marginalized children.

Mick Foley wrote in his autobiography The Hardcore Diaries that he has a Christmas fixation and that "every good thing in my life somehow leads me back to Jefferson, New Hampshire, and the trip to Santa's Village my parents took me on when I was only three years old". In his list of top ten amusement parks, Foley placed Santa's Village first, writing that "[w]hat it lacks in rides, it makes up for in personal nostalgia, a beautiful location, and the magic of Christmas in the summer".

== Attractions ==
=== Roller coasters ===
| Name | Manufacturer | Model | Opened | Details |
|---|---|---|---|---|
| Midnight Flyer | Vekoma | Family Coaster (Horus) | 2024 | Junior coaster that stands 41 feet (12 m) tall, travels 1,148.3 feet (350.0 m) of track, and reaches a top speed of 24.9 mph (40.1 km/h). |
| Poogee Penguin's Spin Out | SBF Visa Group | Compact Spinning Coaster (MX609 3 Loops) | 2016 | Compact spinning roller coaster with penguin-themed ride vehicles. |

=== Rides ===
| Name | Manufacturer | Model | Opened | Details |
|---|---|---|---|---|
| Antique Cars | Gould Manufacturing | Antique Cars | Unknown | Classic antique cars attraction. Includes "Kringle Car Wash" structure riders drive through. |
| Bumper Cars | Preston & Barbieri | Bumper Cars | Unknown | Classic bumper cars attraction. |
| The Chimney Drop | Moser's Rides | Spring Ride 5+5 | Unknown | Small drop tower themed to a chimney. |
| Christmas Ferris Wheel | Eli Bridge Company | Ferris Wheel | Unknown | Classic Ferris Wheel with sixteen benches. |
| The Great Humbug Adventure | Sally Dark Rides | Dark Ride | Unknown | Interactive, multi-level dark ride where guests shoot at targets. Renovated for 2020 season by Sally Dark Rides with larger vehicles, new decor, and a new targeting and scoring system. |
| Himalaya | Unknown | Mini Himalaya | Unknown | Circular ride. |
| Hot Shots Fire Brigade | Zamperla | Fire Brigade | Unknown | Rotating ride where guests shoot water at a faux fire. |
| Jingle Bell Express Train | Allan Herschell Company | Miniature Railway (S24 Iron Horse) | 1969 | Miniature railway. The engine is named the "Jingle Bell Express". Unit #43 |
| The Little Drummer Boy | Unknown | Mini Teacups | Unknown | Small spinning ride with six drum-themed ride vehicles. |
| Little Elf Flying School | Allan Herschell Company | Unknown | Unknown | Rotating children's ride. Originally was a helicopter ride. Was converted to sleighs. |
| Pixie Mix | North Country Inc. | Unknown | Unknown | Small spinning flat ride. |
| Red Hot Racers | Unknown | Raft Slide | Unknown | Small racing raft slide. |
| Reindeer Carousel | Unknown | Carousel | Unknown | Carousel with reindeer and sleigh ride vehicles. |
| Rockin' Around the Christmas Tree | Unknown | Chairswing | Unknown | Classic chairswing ride with the structure themed as a Christmas tree. |
| S.S. Peppermint Twist | Zamperla | Rockin' Tug | Unknown | Spinning boat that rolls back-and-forth on a small track. |
| The Skyway Sleigh | O.D. Hopkins Associates | Unknown | Unknown | Elevated monorail ride with sleigh-shaped ride vehicles. |
| You Tubing | Unknown | Unknown | Unknown | Racing slide comparable to sledding down a hill. |
| Yule Log Flume | O.D. Hopkins Associates | Log Flume | 1983 | Classic log flume attraction through the Yule Forest. |

=== Santa’s Water Park ===
The waterpark is typically open seasonally from May to September, featuring various waterslides and pools.

| Name | Type | Opened | Description |
|---|---|---|---|
| Ho Ho H2O | Water Play Structure | Unknown | Water play structure with numerous waterslides and water features. |
| JOY Ride Slides | Water Slides | 2013 | Trio of waterslides. The wooden tower on which they were built upon was replaced with an updated steel structure for the 2024 season. |
| Polar Paradise | Pool area | 2019 | Interactive water play area for children featuring a wading pool, multiple splash features, and various small waterslides. |
| Poogee’s Splash Pad | Splash pad | 2019 | Splash pad for younger children. |

=== Former attractions ===
- Rudy's Rapid Transit; A steel Zierer Tivoli roller coaster with a reindeer-themed train, which prior to Santa's Village operated at New England Playworld in Hudson, New Hampshire. The ride was replaced by Midnight Flyer (1988 - 2023).

=== Animal attractions ===
Reindeers rendezvous at reindeers' barn, where children can feed reindeers "cookies" (carrots - available from Santa's helper).
