= Ghost Town Village =

Amusement park in North Carolina

- Previously known as Ghost Town in the Sky
- Interactive map of Ghost Town Village
- Location: Maggie Valley, North Carolina, United States
- Coordinates: 35.528769°N 83.102378°W
- Status: Defunct
- Opened: May 1, 1961 (65 years ago)
- Closed: 2016
- Owner: Ghost Town Adventures as of May 2018
- Theme: Wild West
- Slogan: North Carolina's Mile High Theme Park
- Operating season: Spring-Fall
- Attendance: 500,000
- Area: Indian Village, Mountain Town, Mining Town

Attractions
- Total: Tilt-a-whirl, a scrambler, bumper cars, merry-go-round
- Roller coasters: Red Devil Cliffhanger

Ghost Town Village (formerly "Ghost Town in the Sky at Ghost Mountain Park") is an abandoned Wild West-themed amusement park in Maggie Valley, North Carolina, United States whose status is, as of March 2023, the subject of an ongoing lawsuit. It sits atop Buck Mountain, with a top elevation of 4,650 ft (1,420 m). Ghost Town was promoted as "North Carolina's mile-high theme park."

== History ==
=== Location ===
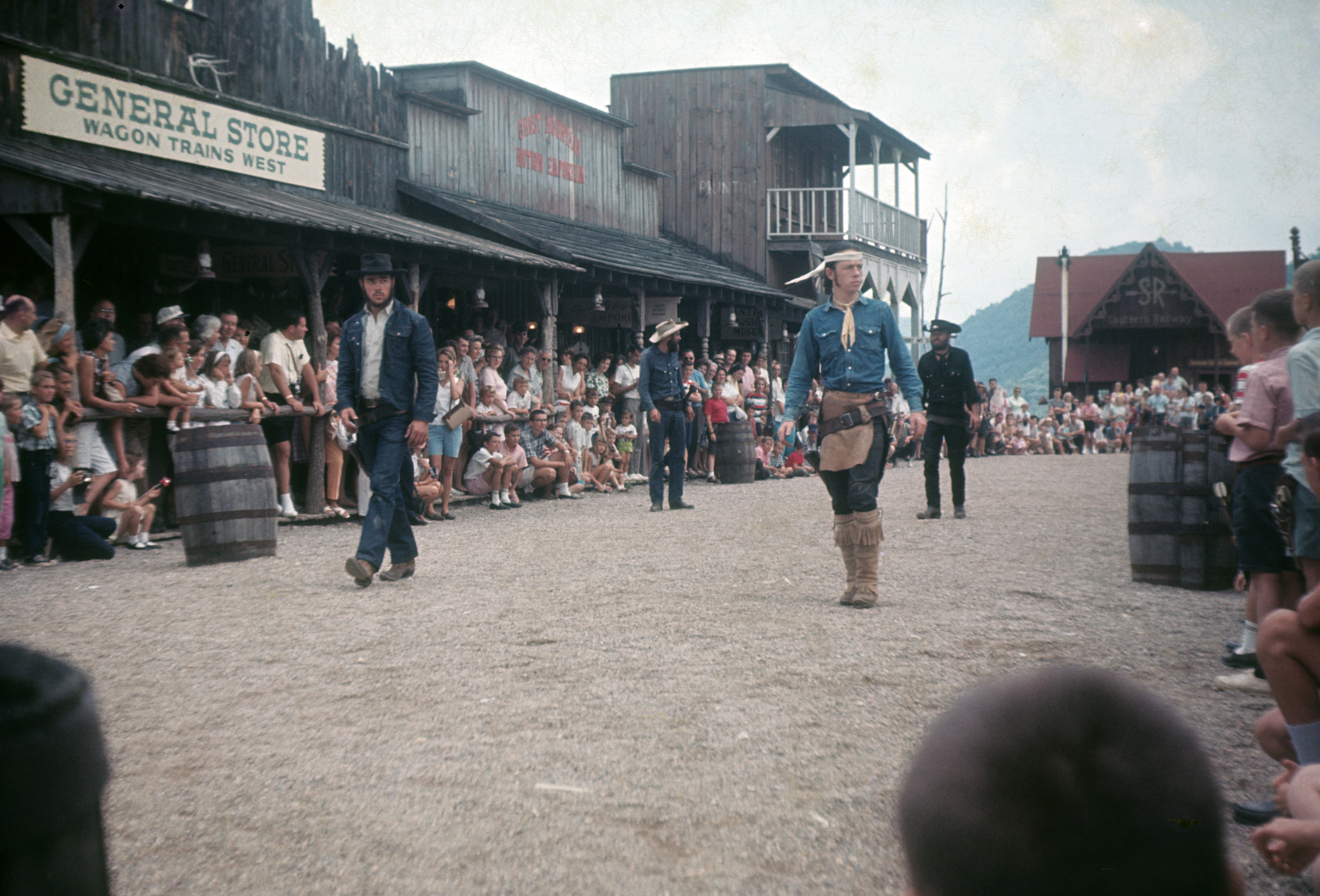
A mock gunfight enacted for tourists at Maggie Valley Ghost Town 1964

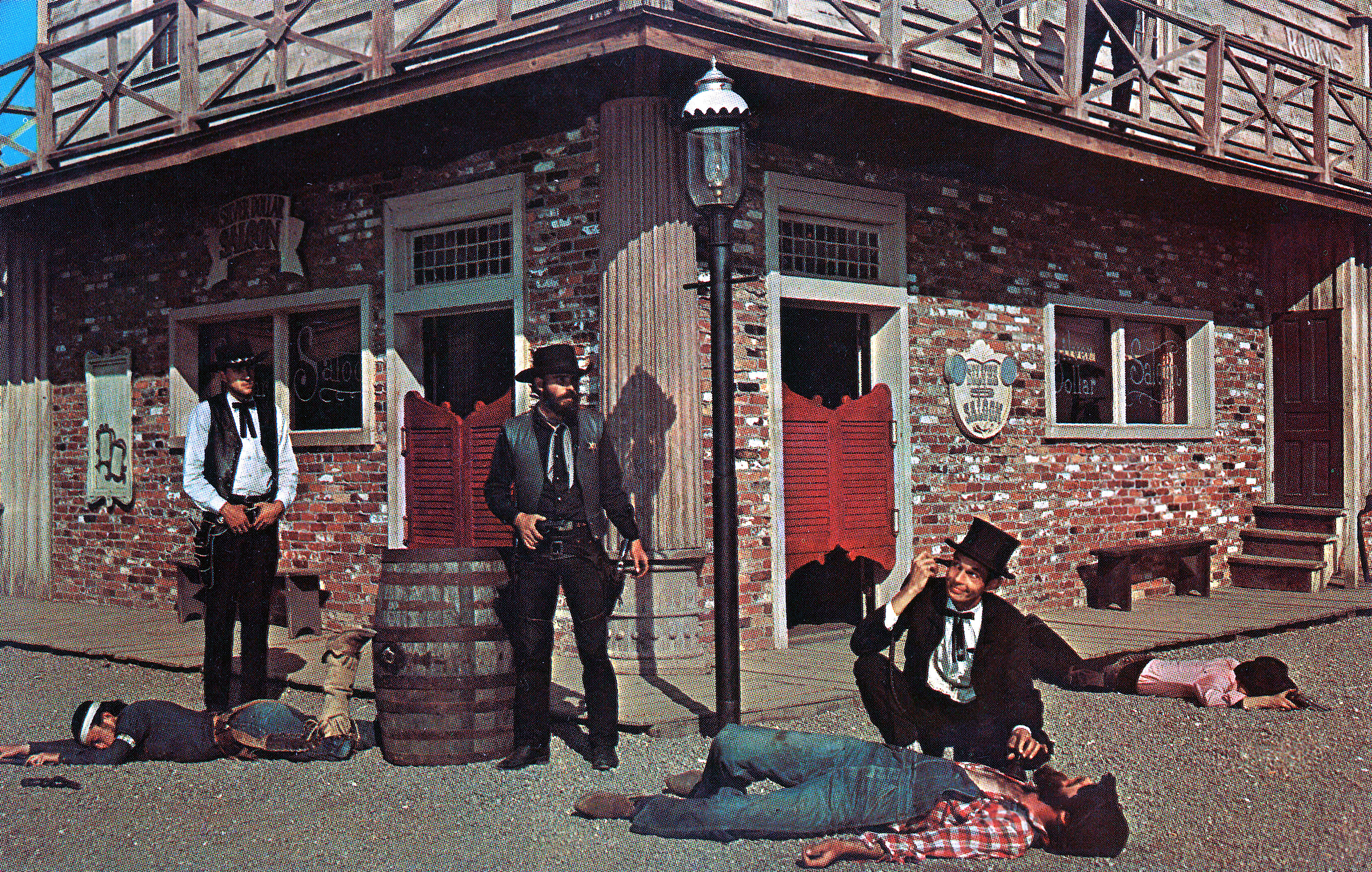
Postcard made by photographer Pal Parker Jr in 1963. In this photograph are Robert Bradley "The Apache Kid"; Harry Valentine; Tic Rich holding gun; Herbert 'Cowboy' Coward lying on ground; Robert Doyle Teaster as the first "Digger the Undertaker".

The park is located on a ridge extending from Buck Mountain border, an extension of the Cataloochee Divide, to the Great Smoky Mountains National Park. The park's entrance is located on U.S. Highway 19, the main road through the town of Maggie Valley. An unusual aspect of this park is that it is located atop a mountain which originally could only be accessed by visitors via a 3,370-foot-long (1,030 m) chair lift or an inclined funicular railway. Attempts to move visitors to the park by bus proved problematic.(At one time visiting the closed park was possible via an abandoned road, but it is a private property and as of October 2019 the new owners have increased security and limited access.) These methods of transport to the park started at the parking area beside Jonathan Creek at an elevation of 3,150 feet (960 m), climbing to the lower level of the park at 4,400 feet (1,300 m), a climb of 1,250 feet (380 m). The recreated "Ghost Town" sits at 4,600 feet (1,400 m), with the highest elevation in the park being about 4,650 feet (1,420 m).

=== Folklore ===
The land to build the park was purchased from a local land owner named Uncle Dan Carpenter in 1960. The story is told that R.B. Coburn had overheard a story of Uncle Dan Carpenter losing his sheep in a large cavern on top of Buck Mountain. R.B. approached Carpenter so he could show him the caverns. R.B. Coburn thought it would be a tourist draw to add mountain cavern tours along with his idea of a western town. They attempted to find them again but when they got to the general area where he had heard his sheep crying, the land had closed up and no cavern entrance was found. Since the park's construction in 1960, this very same area of land continues to collapse between the Indian Village and the main Frontier Town which was later named Mountain Town. Starting in 1960, R.B. Coburn began filling in the area between the two entertainment sections and eventually paved over making it a stable area to place rides. Even as recently as 2007, the park experienced a minor landslide from this paved area of the amusement rides. The existing retaining wall that holds up this paved area was rebuilt with great care by experienced contractors. Then in 2010, the park experienced a major landslide and collapse of the retaining wall. Some people have discounted this story as folklore and others think this is due to the caverns swallowing up land mass slowly after rainfalls.

=== Construction ===
Ghost Town was the brainchild of R.B. Coburn, a Covington, Virginia native who moved to Maggie Valley, North Carolina. Originally, it was planned that the park would be placed between the towns of Waynesville, North Carolina and Clyde, North Carolina, but future owner Alaska Presley suggested the mountain top locale. Local investors provided much of the needed capital for the park in the form of debenture bonds, beginning in 1959. The name of the park was provided by the child of one of the investors. The park was designed by Russell Pearson and constructed for approximately $1 million in 1960, and inspired by Coburn's trips to the western United States. Over two hundred locals help construct the 40 replica buildings that comprised the Western Town, located at the Mountain's peak. About 120,000 square feet of building were constructed, using 300,000 feet of lumber, 200,000 feet of plywood, and 20,000 pounds of nails.

=== Opening ===
The park opened on May 1, 1961, and quickly became one of Western North Carolina's most popular tourist attractions. It showcased a double incline railway to bring park visitors to the top of Buck Mountain, a journey of more than 3,300 feet. The park added a two-seat chairlift, which at the time was the longest in North Carolina and the second longest in the USA. In the early 1960s, the park hosted several stars of TV Westerns, such as Laramie and Wagon Train. Hourly staged gun fights on the main street were a big draw as well.

=== 1960s-1986 ===
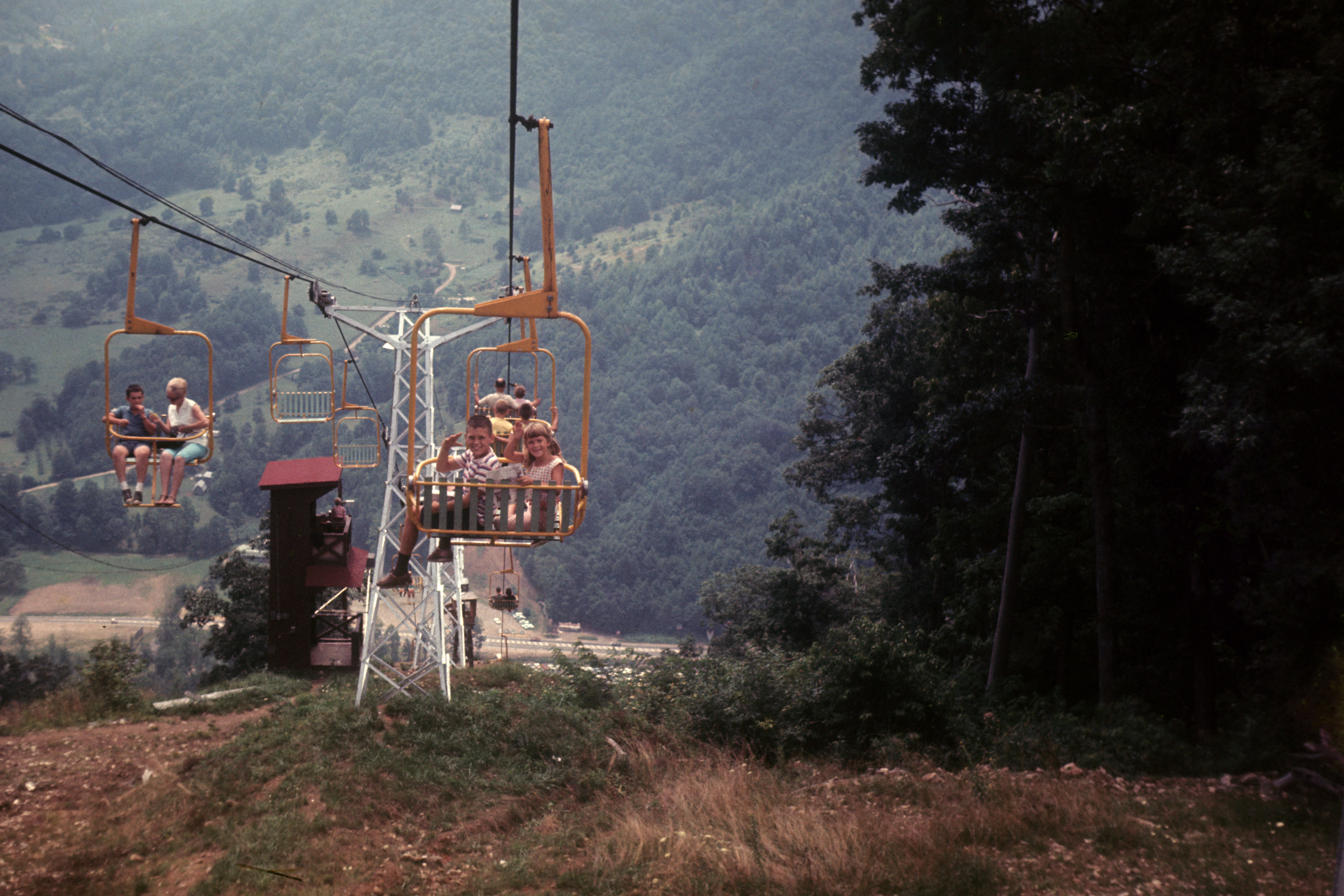
Chair lift carrying tourists to and from the top of the mountain summer 1964

At one point, 620,000 people visited Ghost Town each year. It averaged about 500,000 visitors per year, with the chairlift moving 1,200 people per hour. The park became a major economic driver for the town.

The park was sold in 1973 to National Services for a stock swap. One source stated that the park suffered under this ownership as the small park was not a major concern for the company.

In 1982, performers from the park performed at the World's Fair in Knoxville, Tennessee.

In 1984, a roller coaster was planned, sponsored by Coors Beer at a cost of one million dollars. The name of the coaster was a nod to the sponsor. The area was cleared for the coaster.

In 1986, Coburn bought it back and constructed the park's famous Red Devil roller coaster.

=== Decline ===
In its later years under Coburn's ownership, the park suffered from mismanagement and a lack of maintenance. The Red Devil, Goldrusher, Sea Dragon, Monster, Mountain Town Swings, Undertaker, Dream Catcher, Casino, Round Up, Lil Devil and Silver Bullet rides were regularly breaking down and rarely opened. The chairlift and incline railway also required constant maintenance and repair. Coburn spent thousands of dollars maintaining them. The attendance number declined to 340,000 by 2008.

=== Initial closure ===
On July 16, 2002, the chairlift stopped, stranding passengers for over two hours. With fewer people visiting Ghost Town because of the bad condition of the park, Coburn closed Ghost Town a few days after the chairlift failure and put the park up for sale. The park remained closed and unmaintained for the next four years, leading many to believe that nobody would buy the park because of the bad condition of the rides.

=== Re-opening ===
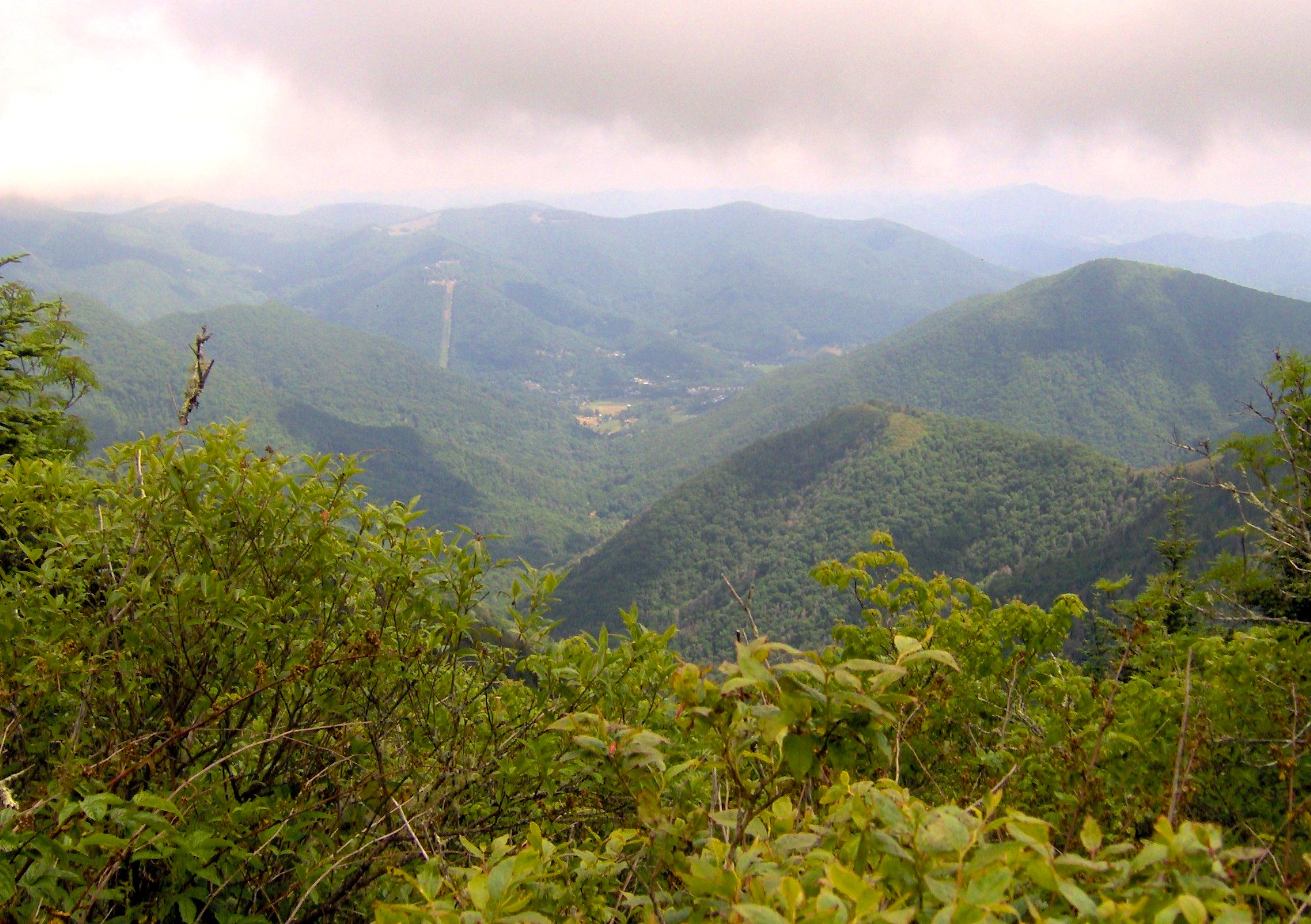
Maggie Valley, North Carolina, viewed from the summit of Waterrock Knob in 2008. The incline railway path that leads to Ghost Town in the Sky is visible left of center.

Ghost Town was sold in August 2006 to Ghost Town Partners, LLC and reopened on May 25, 2007, after $38 million was spent on renovations and improvements. Loans of $10 million were obtained from BB&T; All of the rides were reopened except the incline railway, the train and the Monster. The opening of the park in May was scheduled closely by Dean Teaster and Hank Woodburn so the motion picture Dean Teaster's Ghost Town, which was filmed in the western town could premiere that same weekend. While attendance numbers were not announced, tourism to Haywood County increased 22%. Plans were announced to restore the railway, the train and the monster in the next season.

The 2008 financial crisis had a negative effect on tourism and attendance at the park.

In 2009, after more than $11 million had been spent, $6 million of that on the Cliffhanger roller coaster, Ghost Town filed for bankruptcy. The economy and high gas prices the previous year were blamed for the park's problems, but managing partner Lynn Sylvester said reopening was planned for May 15 and the park would continue to operate.

By mid-May 2009, the park's rides had not been inspected and Ghost Town claimed to need a $330,000 loan in order to reopen for the summer on May 22. The park asked the town for that money. Failure to secure the loan would have probably meant the loss of 200 jobs and a $2 million payroll, as well as impacting local businesses who benefited from park visitors. An anonymous investor provided the money, according to park president Steve Shiver, so a vote by the town on the loan request became unnecessary and the park opened as planned except for rides that had not been inspected. The park also added a new ride, Geronimo Drop, which had been at Libertyland in Memphis, Tennessee and was bought by Ghost Town in 2007. Shiver said the park had a $27 million plan to improve the park over four to five years, including moving and adding rides and introducing new events.

Ghost Town continued to struggle financially until the end of the 2009 season, when the park closed while the owners dealt with bankruptcy issues amid complaints that employees were not being paid. Owners of the Smokey Mountain Railroad in Bryson City attempted to purchase the property, but were unable to obtain financing.

== Attempted re-openings ==
=== 2010 ===
On February 5, 2010, a massive mudslide occurred when retaining walls on the Ghost Town property gave way. Although there were no injuries, more than 40 homes had to be evacuated and three homes were damaged around the mountain. The park itself sustained damage, but to what extent is not publicly known. This led to speculation that the park would not open at all for the 2010 season. Shiver announced on a local news program that the park was still slated to open on Memorial Day weekend, but this did not happen. Federal funding was granted to the park in the amount of $1.3 million for the clean-up of its main access road, Rich Cove, which was buried in the slide.

In early March, 2010, a judge ruled in favor of the park's largest creditors, SunTrust and BB&T, to proceed with foreclosure on Ghost Town and sell the property to begin paying off the park's $9 million debt to SunTrust and $5 million debt to BB&T. Ghost Town partners negotiated a separate deal with SunTrust and BB&T which gave them until May 31 to come up with an alternate plan to allow the park to continue operating if funding was obtained. On May 4, a judge approved a takeover bid by American Heritage Family Parks, who pledged to pay SunTrust $7 million of its debt, BB&T its entire $5 million of debt and pay $100,000 in back taxes to Haywood County. The park was said to be allowed to open for the season while details of the sale were worked out. Instead, the park remained closed.

=== 2011 ===
In April 2011, the bankruptcy administrator recommended dismissing the case, citing the failure of Ghost Town partners to submit a sufficient reorganization plan to pay its debts. This allowed foreclosure proceedings to continue as the park was no longer protected under Chapter 11.

=== 2012 ===
In February 2012, the park was purchased at public auction by Alaska Presley for $2.5 million. Presley, a Maggie Valley businesswoman involved with the park since its beginning, hoped to have at least a portion of the park open for the end of the 2012 season.

On June 29, 2012, the park's A-frame entrance opened to the public for the first time in four years for gifts to be sold. The chairlift was also open and tours of the town could be taken.

=== 2013 ===
A limited opening of the park was planned for 2013. During the four years the park was idle and without security, the property was subject to vandalism and theft. In addition, damage from the 2010 retaining wall failure had to be repaired.

New laws required millions of dollars to be spent on labor and time lost due to state inspections. Wells for private water were condemned because they were too close to potentially unacceptable objects. Four new wells were drilled and all were failures except one of limited output. The option of city water was decided and virtually every piece and part of an old system had to be replaced.

During the Winter, Presley began plans for Resurrection Mountain, a replica of the Holy Land.

=== 2014 ===
In February, Presley attempted to develop a winter attraction for the area but funding was an issue.

In July, the park opened later than planned after having issues with ride inspections.

In November 2014, Ghost Town was listed for sale with an asking price of $3 million by Action Creak Realty. The sale of the lower half of the property, which housed the Western theme park, was placed up for sale to attract investors for Presley's redevelopment of the upper portion of the property as a "Holy Land replica theme park." On January 24, 2015, the property was taken off the market, prompted by major progress in the redevelopment of other parts of the property.

=== 2015 ===
Despite a planned opening, many issues including water pressure problems as well as issues with the chair lift prevented the park from opening.

On October 22, 2015, the park announced the rebranding of the park to Ghost Town Village with a planned opening on June 1, 2016. The rebranded park was to feature gunfights, the chairlift, Appalachian themed gift shops, ziplines, a museum, a paintball course, arcade and horseback riding. According to park management, the rebranding was due to the park's inability to reopen any of its former roller coasters and rides as the repair costs were too high. On June 2, 2016, park management announced that the park would not open in 2016 and was again being offered for sale. Issues were reported with vendors and staff.

=== 2018 ===
As of July 2018, the park was being called Ghost Town Adventures and planned to reopen in fall 2018, after renovation and work on the skylift. Lamar Berry and his partners were working on a purchase agreement for the park property from Alaska Presley. Investors however bailed on the project.

An unaffiliated group attempted to purchase the park, Ghost Town Maggie Valley LLC (some of the members had also worked with Berry), but they failed to get funding as well.

=== 2019 ===
Later, a reopening was planned for spring 2019, with a planned expansion and a renaming to Appalachian Village, but as of July 2019, it was being sold again, with an asking price of $5.9 million. Vandalism was one of the reasons the park had not reopened.

As of October 2019, new investors had a contract and were completing due diligence with an eye to reopen the park.

=== 2020s ===
As of July 2020, work at the site and purchase of the property was still proceeding. With the purchase of the park complete in 2021, the new owners planned a $200 million investment to revitalize the park, in addition other upgrades for Maggie Valley are planned to help accommodate the expected increase in tourism. These plans include niche retail, a hotel and a Biltmore Village style housing area. The goal of the new owners is to preserve the original experience. The plan included a Broadway at the Beach style attraction at the base and an RV resort, as well as local businesses to enhance the entire area. It was hoped that at least a portion would open in late 2021, although the COVID pandemic and local concerns about the impact of increased tourism combined to delay the opening.

On April 4, 2022, Ghost Town owner Alaska Presley died at the age of 98. Following her death, the future of Ghost Town was uncertain as Presley was still the titled owner of the park property at the time of her death. As of August 31, 2022, various lawsuits had been filed.

North Carolina Business Court Judge Adam Conrad dismissed with prejudice a lawsuit by Presley's niece Jill McClure, who inherited 50 percent of Ghost Town. McClure wanted to dissolve Ghost Town in the Sky, LLC and sell the property. The other 50 percent of Ghost Town was owned by an LLC managed by Frankie Wood, who Presley named managing partner. Conrad wrote that regardless of whether McClure and Wood disagreed, Wood had the final say. The ruling meant that development could continue.

Frankie Wood died in 2024, further complicating the legal situation.

== Features ==
The park is divided into several "towns" located at different elevations of the mountain, each with a different theme. Among these are the "Indian Village", "Mountain Town" and "Mining Town." The heart of the park is the recreated Old West town, complete with two saloons, a schoolhouse, bank, jail and church and various other businesses. Each hour, a gunfight was staged in the street, with visitors lining up to watch on the board sidewalks. The "Silver Dollar Saloon" featured hourly shows of Old West can-can dancers, while the "Red Dog Saloon" featured live country and bluegrass music performances throughout the day. "Indian Village" featured shows about Indigenous life in Old West days, including a deer hunt and a raid on a frontier settlement. "Mining Town" had areas where people could pan for gold and silver. It also had shows about life in mining settlements. "Mountain Town" featured shows about life in the Smoky Mountains.

At the terminus of the chairlift and incline railway is the "Heritage Town Square," a 2007 addition to the park. This area featured a museum chronicling the history of "Ghost Town", a restaurant, the Freefall, the casino and the Cliffhanger.

Originally opened in 1988, Red Devil was renamed Cliffhanger in 2007 and given a new paint job. The coaster is unique in that rather than boarding the train and being towed up the lift hill, its boarding station is at the top of the hill. Once riders boarded, the train rolled out of the station, around a 90-degree curve and then over the main drop and into its one inverted loop. The rest of the track extends over the edge of the mountain with great views of the surrounding mountains. Cliffhanger's reopening was pushed back through the 2007 and 2008 seasons because of necessary major repairs.

It opened on June 30, 2009, but was closed less than two days later after a ride operator detected something wrong with one of the train's seats. State inspectors on site discovered a hairline crack in the seat's frame next to a bolt that attached the seat to the rest of the car. Rotational Motion, who built the custom cars for Ghost Town, was tasked with finding a solution. The coaster began operating again during the last few weeks of the 2009 season with no reported problems.

During a test run the day before Ghost Town's 2010 season began, there was a problem with one of the train's wheel chassis. Contrary to reports, the train did not derail, but came to an abrupt halt. Shiver said that Cliffhanger would be closed until a new train was purchased.

The other roller coaster operating at Ghost Town is a children's small coaster, Tumbleweed. It was originally named Lil Devil, but received a name change along with Red Devil/Cliffhanger.

Above Ghost Town, a section of the park hosts a variety of standard amusement rides and the "Mountain Top Music Hall" and "Indian Dance Hall." All of the rides are situated at the edge of the mountain, with one ("The Gun Slinger") that swings out over the mountainside.

A new feature in 2009 was "The House of Terror," a haunted house open during the Halloween season.

| Rides | Manufacturer (Model) | Description |
|---|---|---|
| Bumper Cars | Bertazzon (Bumper Cars) | The Bumper Cars closed in 2002 and reopened in 2007. |
| Chairlift | Carlevaro-Savio (Chairlift) | The chairlift's re-opening was slightly delayed when the park opened in 2007 after a five-year hiatus. The chairlift is now fully operational and the only method to get to the park other than the narrow, steep road since the Incline Railway is still not in operation. |
| Cliffhanger | O.D. Hopkins (Roller Coaster) | The park's original steel loop roller coaster operated from 1988 until the closure of the park in 2002. It was originally scheduled to reopen in the 2007 season, but was delayed until 2009 due to safety and necessary state code updates. The ride reopened June 30, 2009, but was closed two days later when state inspectors found a hairline crack on one of the new train's frames. It reopened during October 2009, but closed again a few days later after more mechanical issues. The Cliffhanger features only one inversion and travels at a top speed of around 40 mph (on the first drop). The lift hill is unique in that it is located at the end of the ride. (The coaster was originally called the Red Devil when it first opened.) |
| Sea Dragon | Chance Rides (Sea Dragon) | The Sea Dragon opened in 1995 and operated until the park's closure in 2002. It reopened in 2008 after being closed for a year. |
| Dream Catcher | Hrubetz (Paratrooper) | The original paratrooper was operated until the park's closure in 2002. It reopened in 2007 as "Dream Catcher," featuring a new wooden floor and enclosing fence. |
| Geronimo Drop | Fabbri (Drop Tower) | Drop Tower was bought from Libertyland and opened in May 2007 as new addition to the park. |
| Gunslinger | Chance Rides (Yo-Yo) | The original gunslinger was operated until the park's closure in 2002. It reopened in 2007 with a new red and yellow color scheme. Permanent park model. |
| Incline Railway | (Incline Railway) | Safety and code delays prevented the ride's planned reopening for the 2007 season after the park's five-year hiatus. |
| Silver Bullet | Flume on Rail/Prototype ride | The Silver Bullet never opened as a cart derailed during a test run and was destroyed. The entire ride was a custom-built in-house ride. |
| Merry-Go-Round | (Carousel) | The Merry-Go-Round operated until the park's closure in 2002. It reopened in 2007. |
| Round Up | Hrubetz (Round Up) | The original Round Up operated until the park's closure in 2002. It reopened in 2007 with a new color scheme and a new underwall. |
| Monster | Eyerly Aircraft Company(Monster) | The Monster opened in 1992 and closed in 2000, two years before the park closed. Monster suffered from numerous mechanical breakdowns. |
| Train | (Train) | The Train was originally set to reopen with the park in May 2007 after the park's five-year hiatus, but was delayed for more than two years. The Train reopened in September 2009, but closed with the rest of the park in 2010. |
| Tumbleweed | Schiff (Kiddie Coaster) | Opened as Lil Devil in 1992 and operated until 2002. It reopened in 2007, although it was closed for three weeks after a mechanical malfunction. |
| Mining Town Swing | Sellner (Swing) | The Mining Town Swing opened in 1966 and operated until the park's closure in 2002. It reopened in 2007, but was closed in 2009 after a mechanical malfunction caused several riders to be injured. |
| Tilt-A-Whirl | Sellner (Tilt-A-Whirl) | Tilt-A-Whirl operated from 1961 until the park's closure in 2002. It was closed from 2007 through 2009. It reopened in 2010, but was closed for two weeks after more mechanical problems. |
| Casino | Chance Rides(Trabant) | Casino opened in 2000 and operated for two years before the park closed in 2002. It was closed for a year before reopening in 2008. |
| Undertaker | Eli Bridge Company(Scrambler) | The original indoor scrambler called Black Widow was operated until the park's closure in 2002. It reopened in 2007 with a new color scheme, was moved to an outdoor location and renamed "Undertaker." |

== Sister parks ==
Pearson and Coburn also opened Frontierland in Cherokee, North Carolina in 1964, then another Wild West theme park: Six Gun Territory in Florida. Attempts by R.B. Coburn to open a park in Ocala, Florida from profits from the sale of this park failed to succeed.

== Ghost Town: The Movie ==
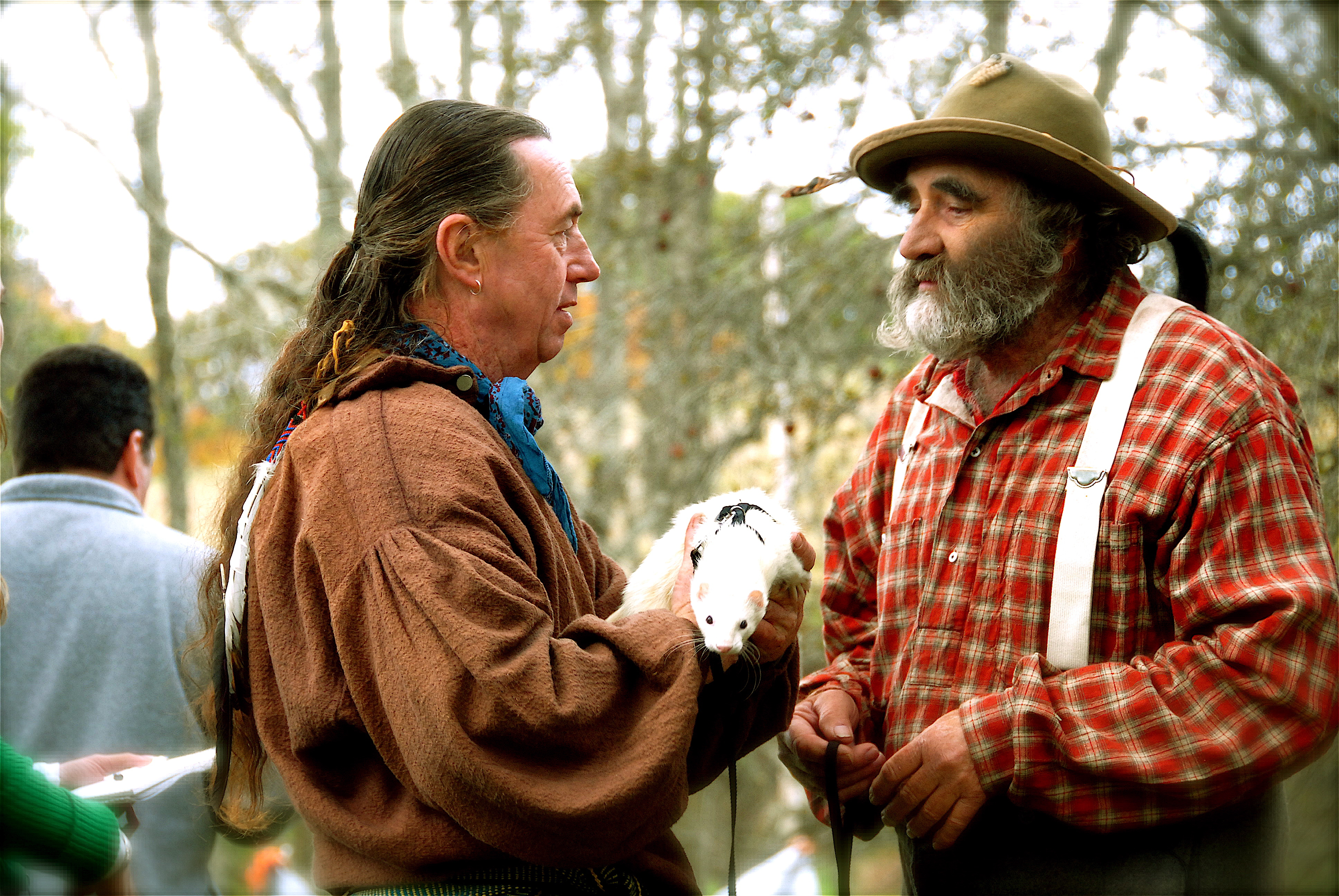
On the movie set of Dean Teaster's Ghost Town, with Robert Bradley (Apache Kid) as Jim Jumper and Herbert 'Cowboy' Coward (Deliverance 1973) as Harmon Teaster. Both are original Ghost Town in the Sky gunfighters from the original 1961 crew.

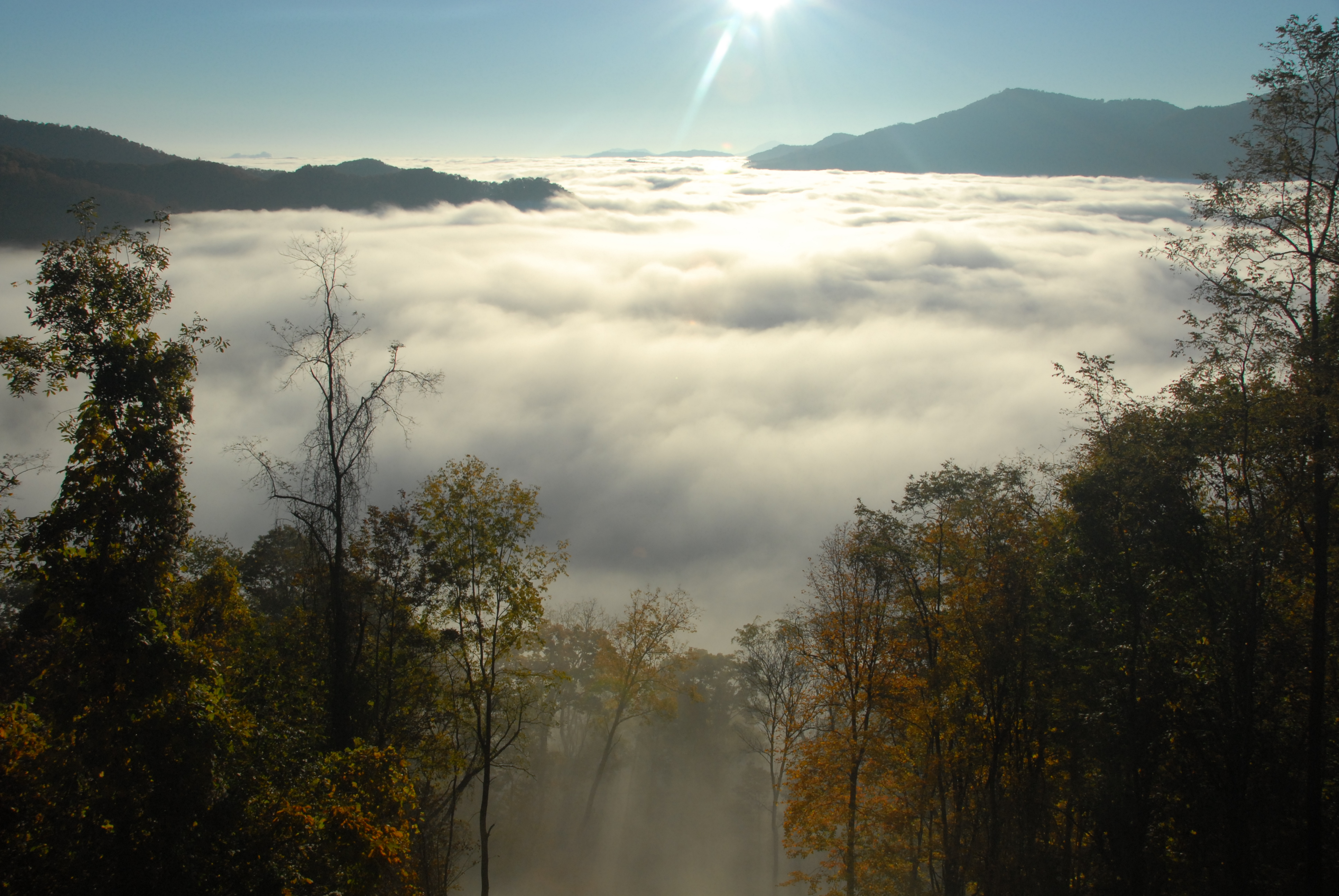
View from Rich Cove Road, which is only road going up to Ghost Town in the Sky.

In October and November 2006, a movie was filmed at the park. The film, titled Ghost Town: The Movie, was directed by Haywood County native Dean Teaster and technical director Jeff Kennedy. The film starred Bill McKinney and Herbert Coward, DJ Perry, Renee O'Connor, Terrance Knox, and Princess Lucaj with appearances by Rance Howard and Stella Parton (Dolly's sister). The movie was based on the legend of Harmon Teaster, a Haywood County native from Cold Springs now named Harmon Den Game Refuge Area, and premiered at the Eaglenest Entertainment Center in Maggie Valley on June 2, 2007. The inspiration of the movie came from Haywood County native Dean Teaster who had a story to tell about his ancestor Harmon Teaster and Ghost Town in the Sky, where he spent many summers as a child. Teaster's desire was to capture Ghost Town in the Sky as how it might have looked in the late 1870s.

Ghost Town: The Movie, later titled Dean Teaster's Ghost Town, at the time of release on Lionsgate label was listed the most rented Western film by "Rentrax" reporting service. This position held for sixteen weeks after its release. The rename was due to Paramount releasing their movie titled Ghost Town a month prior to the Lionsgate release of Ghost Town: The Movie. The movie brought elements of the original gunfight staged plays written by RB Coburn and Hubert Presley from the early 1960 era. Some of the gunfighters in the movie were the original gunfighter crew of 1961. From the 1960s gunfighter crew were Robert Bradley, Johnny Rich, Harry Valentine, and several others from the late 90's gunfighter crew. These men were highly trained and experienced gunfighters who brought R.B. Coburn's original dream to the film. Dean Teaster's desire was to capture some of the original park design by Coburn and Russell Pearson, to keep it forever forged on film. Dean Teaster also brought his fathers character "Digger the Undertaker", back to life in the film to give tribute to his fathers original first creation of Coburn's fictional character "Digger the Undertaker". While Robert Teaster is noted as being one of the original "Internationally Famous Ghost Town Gunfighters" as well as the first undertaker, many other original gunfighters shared in this movie tribute to the first gunfighter crew. A marble stone was erected at the base of the mountain after filming as a tribute to the first gunfighter crews and the Hollywood stars that performed there.

Private investors stepped forward to make this movie a reality. There was Robert Bradley, the original "Apache Kid" from the 1960s gunfighter crew who first stepped forward with half of the movie's budget. Shortly after his announced investment, Alaska Presley came forward and invested the other half. Alaska Presley was the wife of Hubert Presley, one of Ghost Town's original partners with R.B. Coburn.

Ghost Town's Robert Bradley, often referred to as "that Bradley boy from the old road," held a special role in the film as well as being the primary investor. His role was a tribute to his grandfather, Mr. Jim Jumper, who himself was a full blooded Eastern Band Cherokee. Dean Teaster's vision with Robert Bradley, was to highlight Bradley's many years of acting experience going back to the days of acting with Burt Reynolds; Frank McGrath; Clint Walker; Clu Gulagar and many other Hollywood greats. Robert's career began in 1961 when he was asked to be in a gunfight by R.B. Coburn in the summer of 1961. Roberts performance on that day set in motion a lifetime career as R.B Coburn would not let him return to his previous job. He performed a fall in a gunfight that was so spectacular that R.B. was noted as saying, "Don't let him go back to the bottom of the mountain again, he stays here, he's my gunfighter." As of that day, he was considered to be one of the top highlighted character performers bringing to life, R.B. Coburn's vision of "The Apache Kid," better known as Haskay-Bay-Nay-Ntayl. R.B. Coburn had an avid interest in the life this U.S. Army scout who would later become a notorious renegade active in the borderlands of Arizona and New Mexico. R.B. Coburn was taken by the resemblance between the 1800s Apache Kid and Robert Bradley. Dean Teaster's Ghost Town: The Movie brings many elements of Ghost Town's "The Apache Kid," in the depiction of Jim Jumper.

== See also ==
- List of funicular railways
- List of amusement parks in the Americas
