= Magic Landing =

Former American theme park

Coordinates: 31.6708°N 106.2575°W

Magic Landing was a theme park located in El Paso, Texas, operating from 1984 to 1988. Magic Landing was one of two amusement parks operating in El Paso during the 1980s, the other being Western Playland. Reportedly the park was built on a budget of $10,000,000.

Magic Landing was planned to open on memorial day 1984 but was pushed back to July 4, 1984. When the park opened admission was free because the rides weren't ready to operate. A crowd of about 30,000 were in attendance. The park included the Old Galveston Railway, a 3 ft (914 mm) narrow-gauge railroad within the park. The Locomotive was a replica from the 1850s designed for 200 passengers.

The park had bought several items from a defunct arcade named Castle Park Arcade. These included Arcade Machines and props from the golf course as well as animatronics that would play in the Bijou Theater an Amphitheatre with six stages.

During Magic Landing's brief run, rumors of various incidents were circulated, but one confirmed incident caused the park's attendance numbers to fall over the next three years and may have led to its closure. In the summer of 1985, Frank Guzman Jr, an 18-year-old male employee, was killed at the park. He was asked by a patron to retrieve his baseball hat for him from off the roller coaster track. The teenager climbed up the track and rested his arm on the active part of the track. Within a few minutes, the roller coaster went down the track and cut his arm off. After an hour on the track, the young man was rushed to William Beaumont Army Medical Center and died three hours later. This recounting of events was contested by Franks family and other sources. A lawsuit was filed against the park and was later settled. This incident made many people nickname the park "Tragic Landing".

In 1988, Magic Landing closed to the public mid-season due to low attendance and problems obtaining the $1 million insurance policy required by the state. The park was reportedly placed for sale but was never sold. (The high insurance rate stemmed from the above-mentioned roller coaster death.) There were attempts to reopen the park for the proceeding 5 years but they failed. Since its closing, Magic Landing's buildings have stood out in the El Paso desert, many of them falling apart, for over 20 years. (The rides, though, only remained until the early to mid-1990s.) In 2009, by the county's request, the remaining buildings and rubble on the property were demolished due to multiple incidents of vandalism and arson over the previous few years. CFI Trucking now uses the land as a lot for their trailers. The frame for the sign and the bases for the ticket booths are among the only remnants of the park. Western Playland, El Paso's only other amusement park, has since been relocated to Sunland Park, New Mexico.

== Attractions ==
Ride	Year opened	Year closed	Manufacturer	Type	Description
Old Galveston Railway	1984	1988		Train	The Old Galveston Railway would travel around the park. The train is now permanently located at El Paso Connection. Train formerly ran at Legend City amusement park in Tempe Az in the 1960's and 1970's. The "lost Dutchman" faces are still on the passenger cars.
Wildcat	1984	1985	Schwarzkopf	Roller Coaster	This was a wildcat 65m model designed by Ing.-Büro Stengel GmbH and manufactured by Schwarzkopf. The ride originally opened in 1973 at Six Flags Magic Mountain as Mountain Express before it was closed in the 1982 season. It was than purchased by Magic Landing and opened during the 1984 season. It was located near the back of the park. The ride closed after the 1985 accident and was left SBNO from 1985 to 1990. The ride would then be sold to a park in Mexico named Bosque Mágico where it would open as Montaña Rusa. The ride would eventually be scrapped sometime after 2006.
Buck Sawyer's Mill	1984	1988	Arrow Dynamics	Log Flume	This was an Arrow Dynamics Log Flume Ride.
Ferris Wheel	1984	1988		Ferris Wheel	When the park opened the Ferris Wheel was being advertised by Magic Landing as the "Largest Ferris Wheel in Texas". The ferris wheel was 15 stories tall and had 40,000 light bulbs.
Swinging Ship	1984	1988		Pirate Ship	
Merry-Go-Round	1984	1988		Carousel	
Rainbow					
Wave Swinger	1984	1988		Swing Ride	
Enterprise	1984	1988		Enterprise	

== Notable Appearances ==
Guitarist Charlie Sexton performed in 1986 at Magic Landing

Kickboxer Cliff "Magic" Thomas was at the park on July 26th, 1987 for a meet & greet.

== Media ==
The Herrera Family Collection, no. 9 - Magic Landing (1985)
