= Desert Storm (roller coaster) =

Roller coaster in Phoenix, Arizona, US

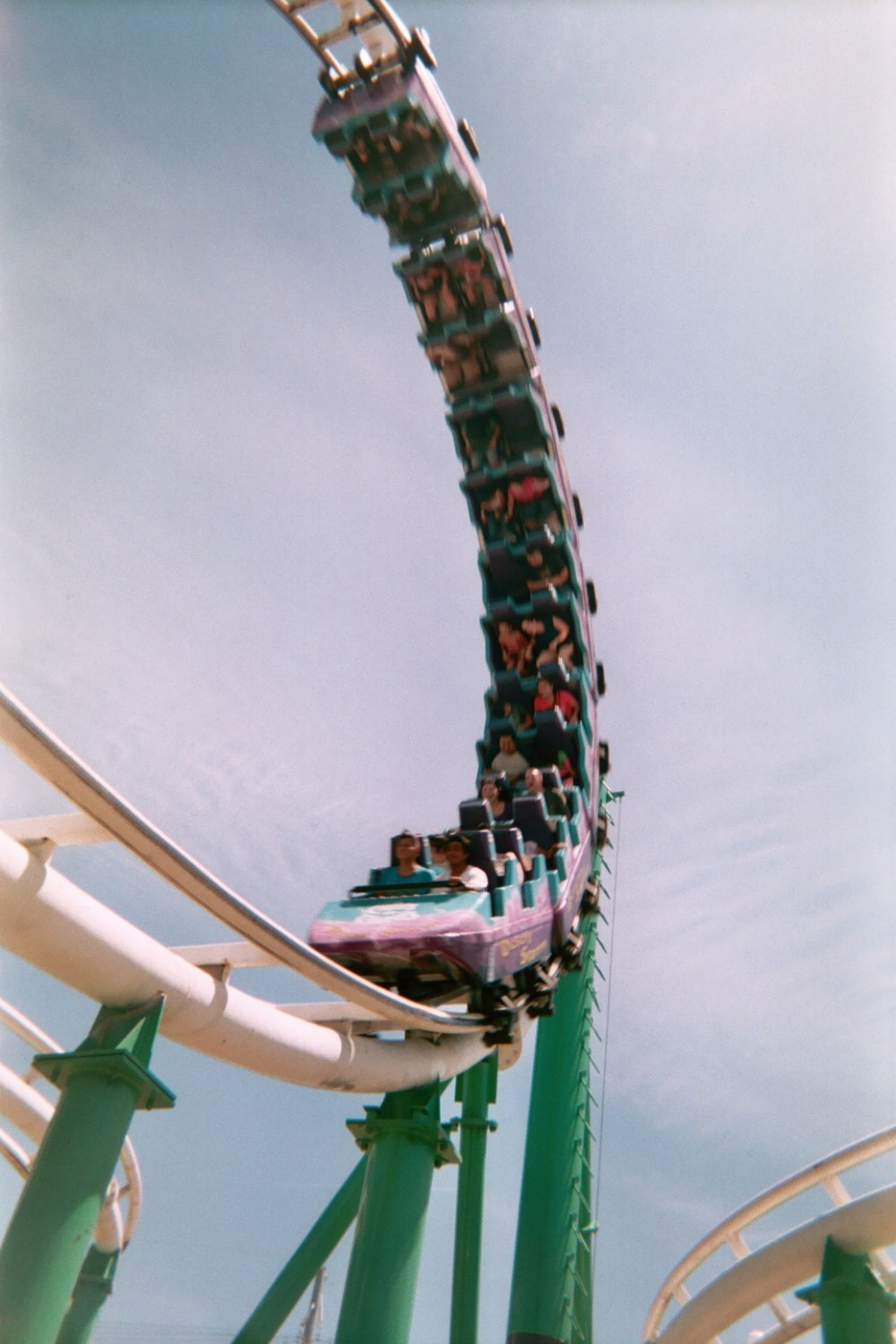

Castles N' Coasters
- Location: Castles N' Coasters
- Coordinates: 33.571848°N 112.118752°W
- Status: Operating
- Opening date: 1992

General statistics
- Type: Steel
- Manufacturer: Hopkins Rides
- Lift/launch system: Chain lift hill
- Inversions: 2
- Height restriction: 42 in (107 cm)
- Trains: Single train with 7 cars; riders arranged 2 across in 2 rows for a total of 28 riders per train
- Desert Storm at RCDB

Desert Storm is a steel roller coaster located at Castles N' Coasters amusement park in Phoenix, Arizona, United States. Manufactured by Hopkins Rides, it opened in 1992 and is one of two roller coasters in the park. In 2017, Desert Storm was featured in the Macgillivray Freeman film Dream Big: Engineering Our World. The ride contains two looping inversions.

== Track layout ==
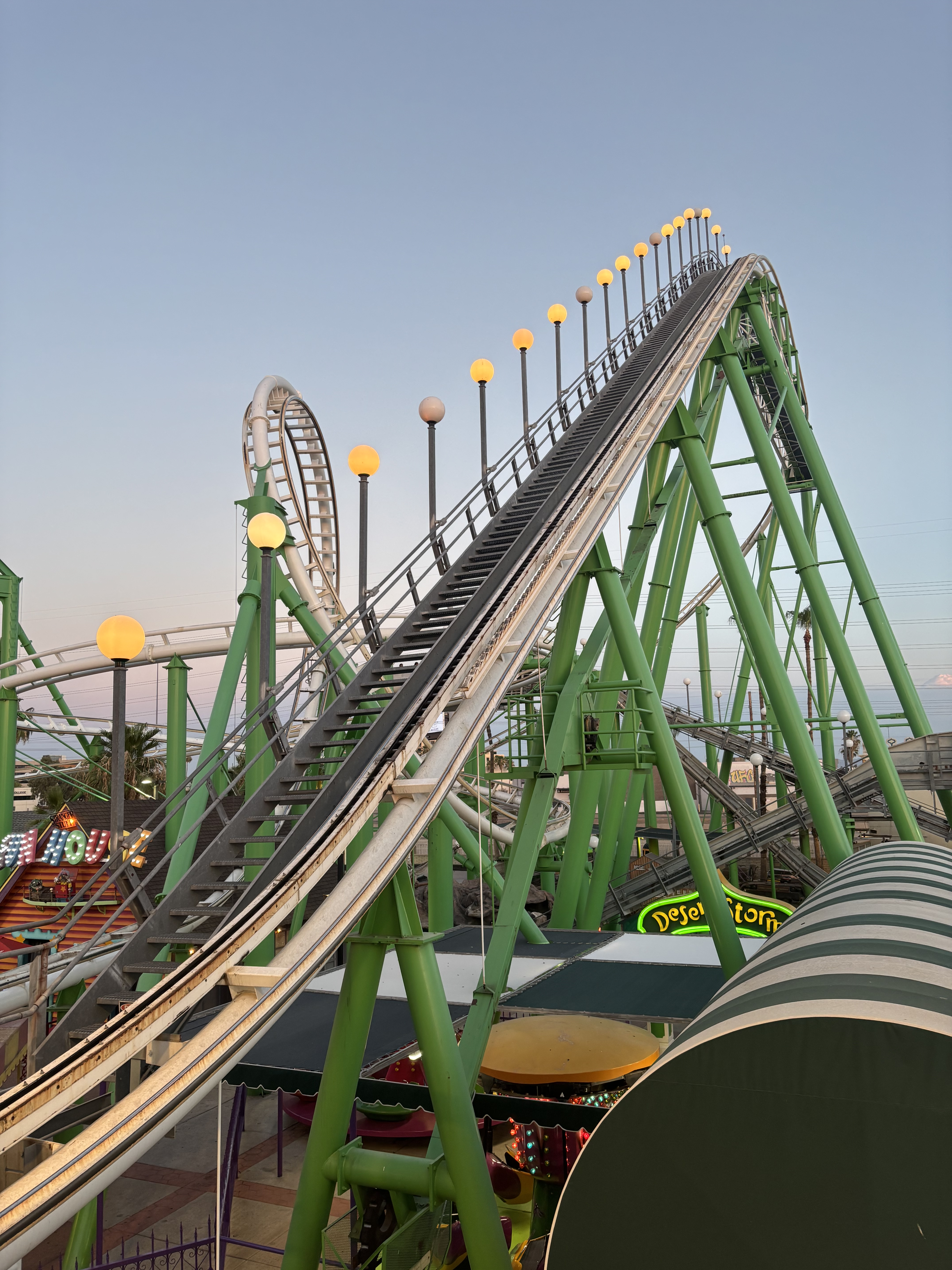
The lift-hill of Desert Storm in 2026.

After riders board and are secured by a lap restraint, the train moves forward and into a chain lift hill. At the top, it takes a narrow turn as it makes a steep dive into a vertical loop. This is followed by a wide turn into its second looping inversion, which is interlocked with a lateral circular turn. Another circular turn follows before the train enters another drop and one addition turn as it returns to the station.

=== Ride elements ===
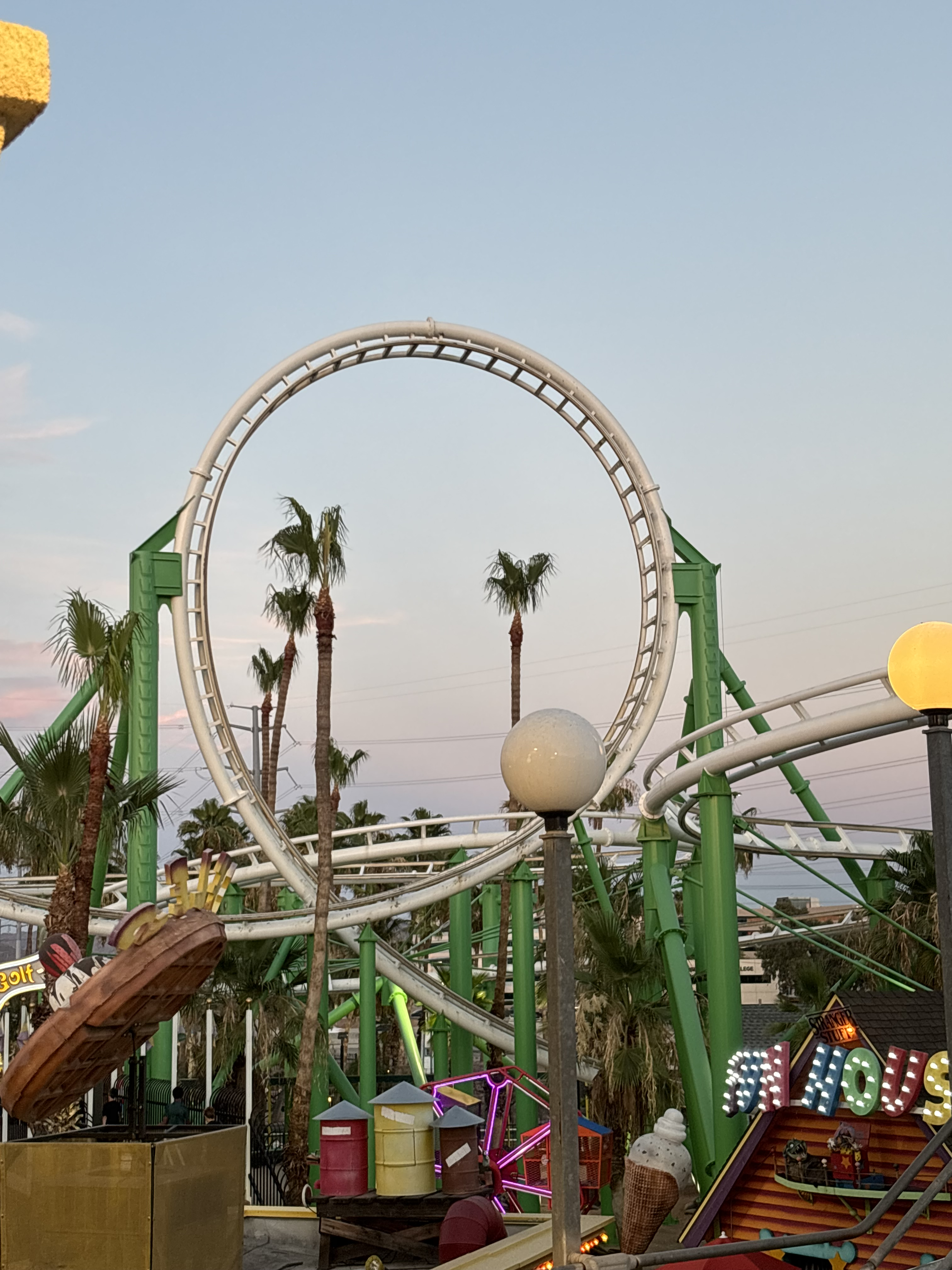
A vertical loop on Desert Storm

- Chain lift
- Curved Drop To The Left
- Two loops

== Incident ==
On November 24, 2024, a rider on the Desert Storm narrowly escaped injury after claiming that his lap bar restraint unlocked while ascending the lift hill. He jumped from the moving train onto an emergency catwalk moments before the first drop. The park did not address requests for comment in the days following the event.
