= Wonderland Park (Texas) =

Amusement park in Amarillo, Texas, United States

- Previously known as Kiddieland Park (1951-1966)
- Interactive map of Wonderland Park
- Location: 2601 Dumas Drive, Amarillo, Texas, United States
- Coordinates: 35.240752°N 101.832090°W
- Status: Operating
- Opened: August 12, 1951; 74 years ago
- Owner: Roads family Borchardt family
- Slogan: WOW!
- Operating season: May through September
- Area: 10 acres (4.0 ha)

Attractions
- Total: 43
- Roller coasters: 4
- Water rides: 4
- Website: www.wonderlandpark.com

Wonderland Park is an amusement park located in Thompson Memorial Park, Amarillo, Texas, United States.

== Park history ==
The park was founded in 1951 by Paul and Alathea Roads. In 1969, several new rides were added that appealed to people of all ages, including a bumper car ride. The park is still run by the Roads family. It has been described by most of the Amarillo population as an important part of the local culture.

The COVID-19 pandemic shut down the 2020 season from mid-March to mid-June.

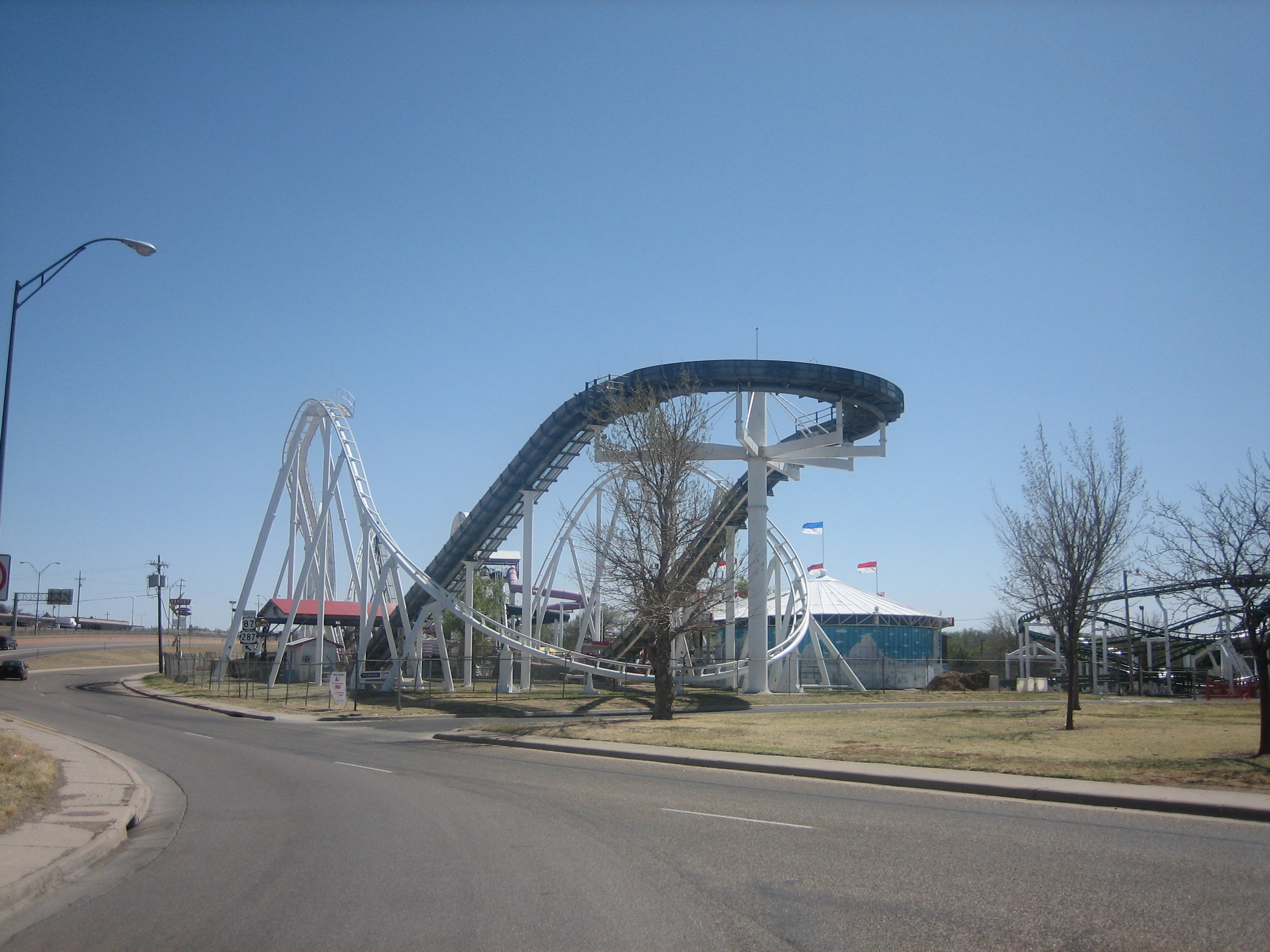
Looking south towards the Texas Tornado and Shoot the Chute

== Attractions ==
- Amusement Park Rides
- Miniature Golf
- Arcade/Games
- The Food Booth
- Drink Booth
- Cotton Candy Booth

=== Roller coasters ===
Name	Year opened	Type	Manufacturer	Comments
Texas Tornado	1985	Custom Steel Looping Roller Coaster	Hopkins	
Hornet	2009	Custom MK-700	Vekoma	Formerly operated at Boblo Island Amusement Park in Amherstburg, Ontario, Canada, and Six Flags AstroWorld in Houston, Texas.
Mouse Trap	1975	Zyklon (Z64)	Pinfari	
Cyclone	1968	Wild Mouse	Miler Manufacturing	Formerly operated at Springlake Park in Oklahoma City, Oklahoma, and Funtown in Atlanta, Georgia.

=== Major rides ===
Name	Year opened	Manufacturer	Type	Comments
Drop Of Fear	2004	Moser's Rides	Drop Tower	Purchased from a traveling carnival group based out of the Florida Everglades. Not currently operating.
Fantastic Journey	1974	Paul Roads	Dark Ride	
Texas Intimidator	2009	Moser's Rides	Flipping Action Arm	
Old Tymer	2021	Gould Manufacturing	Antique Cars	
Fiesta Swing	2007	Chance Rides	Yo-Yo	Formerly operated at Six Flags AstroWorld in Houston, Texas.
Bumper Cars	1970	Soli of Italy	Bumper Cars	
Himalaya	1988	Reverchon Industries	Himalaya	
Sky Ride	1960	Hopkins Rides	Chairlift	
Sky Rider	1960	Hopkins Rides	Monorail	Not currently operating.
Pirate Ship	1990	Intamin	Swinging Ship	
The Rainbow	1990	HUSS	Rainbow	Not currently operating.
Scrambler	1989	Eli Bridge Company	Scrambler	
Balloons	1985	Bradley & Kaye	Balloon	
Tilt-A-Whirl	1999	Wood Amusement Rides B.V.	Tilt-A-Whirl	
Wonder Wheel	1980	S.D.C.	Ferris Wheel	

=== Water rides ===
Name	Year opened	Manufacturer	Type	Comments
Rattlesnake River	1988	Hopkins Rides	River Rapids	
Thunder Jet Racers	1980	Hopkins Rides	Two-man Raft Ride	
Pipeline Plunge	1986	Hopkins Rides	Dual Raft Slide	
Big Splash Log Flume	1980	Hopkins Rides	Log Flume	
Shoot the Chute		Hopkins Rides	Boat Flume	

=== Children’s rides ===
Name	Year opened	Manufacturer	Type	Comments
Helicopters	1977	Venture Manufacturing	Helicopters	
Boats	1951	Allan Herschell Company	Boat Ride	
Frog Hopper	1999	S&S Power	Frog Hopper	
Kiddie Bumper Cars	2002	Duce	Kiddie Bumper Cars	
Umbrella Car Ride	1970	Hampton	Umbrella Ride	
Merry-Go-Round	1951	Philadelphia Toboggan Company	Carousel	
Train		Chance Rides	Train ride	Contains an air whistle, electric powered swinging bell and smoke maker. Not currently operating.
