= Texas Tornado (roller coaster) =

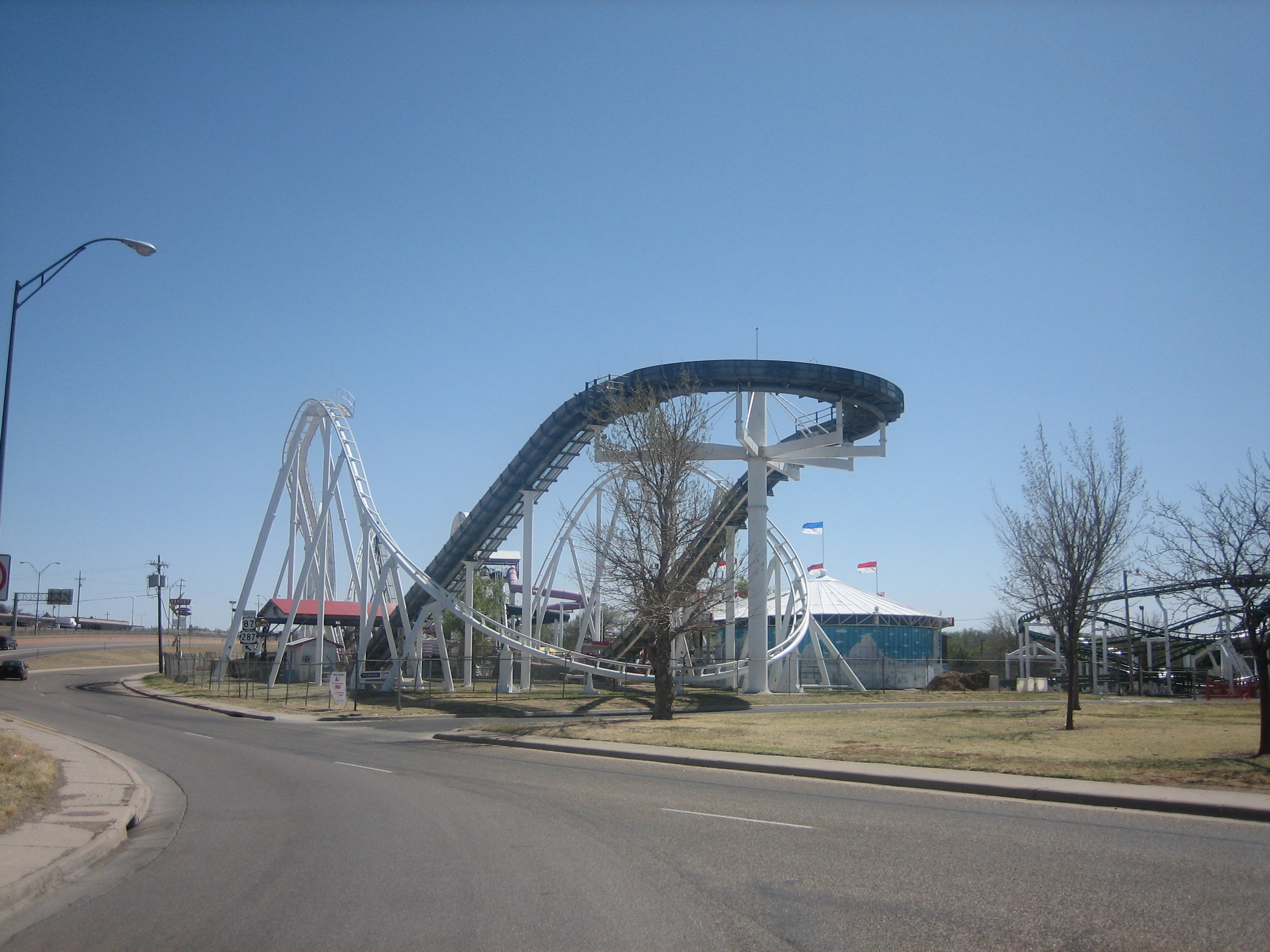
- Looking south towards the Texas Tornado and Shoot the Chute in 2008

Wonderland Park (Texas)
- Location: Wonderland Park (Texas)
- Coordinates: 35.243721°N 101.832064°W
- Status: Operating
- Opening date: 1985

General statistics
- Type: Steel
- Manufacturer: Hopkins Rides
- Height: 80 ft (24 m)
- Length: 2,050 ft (620 m)
- Inversions: 2
- Height restriction: 50 in (127 cm)
- Trains: Single train with 5 cars. Riders are arranged 2 across in 2 rows for a total of 20 riders per train.
- Texas Tornado at RCDB

The Texas Tornado is a steel roller coaster at Wonderland amusement park in Amarillo, Texas. It is the first coaster to be designed by North American water ride company Hopkins Rides. The design for Texas Tornado was scribbled on a napkin at a cocktail party at a trade show.

During testing, the loops were reprofiled while retaining their original structures due to the trains being unable to complete the loop. During the park's 2009 winter off-season, the all-white coaster was repainted red, white and blue.

== Ride Layout ==
Riders begin by climbing the chain lift hill beside the highway to the coaster's highest point of 80 ft (24.4 m) before it heads down the first drop. Immediately after the drop, the train powers through a 72 ft (21.9 m) tall vertical loop before heading along an elevated section nearly level section of track with a slight dip to the right. The train turns downwards and left and then back up and left towards the second 52 ft (15.8 m) tall vertical loop. After the second loop, the train heads down and through a 13 ft (4 m) deep, 200 ft (61 m) long tunnel before climbing back to the brake run. The Texas Tornado's famous double loops do not occur in a row, but are lined up to appear that way.
