= Western Playland =

Amusement park in New Mexico

- Interactive map of Western Playland
- Location: Sunland Park, New Mexico, United States
- Coordinates: 31.80304°N 106.55988°W
- Opened: 1960
- Owner: Traders Village
- Theme: Theme Park
- Area: 25 acres (10 ha)

Attractions
- Total: over 30
- Roller coasters: 2
- Water rides: 1
- Website: westernplayland.com

Western Playland is a 25-acre (10 ha) amusement park located in Sunland Park, New Mexico. It was located in Ascarate Park in El Paso, Texas, from 1960 until 2006, but after conflicts with El Paso County, owner Pat Thompson decided to move it to Sunland Park where the owner of Sunland Park Casino donated land right across from his casino.

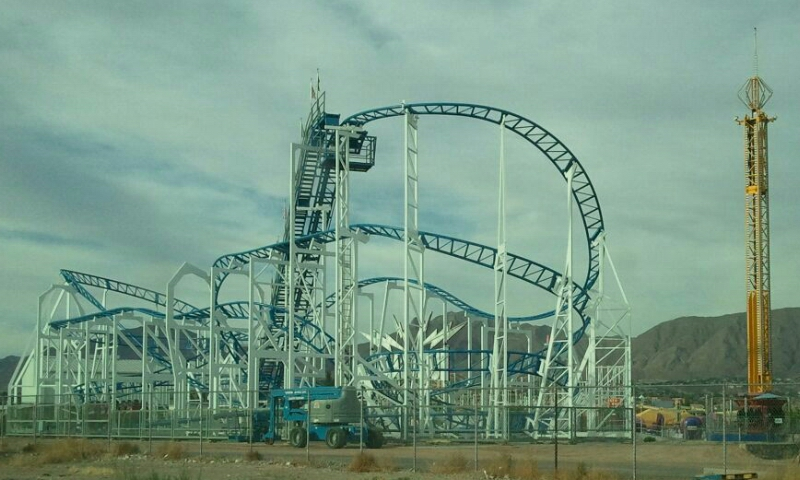
New coaster "The Hurricane"

It is home to the rides The Hurricane, Tsunami, El Bandido Roller Coaster, Tilt-a Whirl, Pharaoh's Fury, Scrambler, Himalaya, and more.

The park is opened seasonally, usually March to October. It opens only during the weekends for most of the season, except for summer, its peak season, when they also open during the week.

== See also ==
- Magic Landing, former rival
