= List of incidents at Warner Bros. Movie World =

This is a list of notable incidents that have taken place at Warner Bros. Movie World in Gold Coast, Queensland Australia.

The term incident refers to major injury, injuries, deaths, and significant crimes. While these incidents are required to be reported to regulatory authorities for investigation, attraction-related incidents usually fall into one of these following categories:

- Negligence on the part of the park, either by ride operator or maintenance.
- Caused by negligence on the part of the guest. This can be refusal to follow specific ride safety instructions, or deliberate intent to break park rules.
- The result of a guest's known, or unknown, health issues.
- Act of God or a generic accident (e.g. slipping and falling) that is not a direct result of an action on anyone's part.

== Green Lantern Coaster ==
- On 8 January 2013, the coaster stopped on the tracks twice. Before noon, eight teenagers were stuck on the ride for 70 minutes due to a minor wiring issue. Later, eight more teenagers were stuck on the ride for 30 minutes while the problem was identified and fixed.
- On 15 March 2015, one car of a train became detached from rails when a wheel mechanism broke. A Queensland Fire Service Inspector described it as "a fairly catastrophic failure of the carriage" that was the "first time we'd ever seen the actual failure of the machinery". An investigation revealed that there was a design flaw in the wheel assembly dealing with a bolted joint, and that there was "really nothing that Movie World could have done to prevent it." S&S Worldwide redesigned the flawed components, and tested the ride, before it reopened to the public on 16 December 2015.
- On 19 November 2016, the coaster stopped on the tracks for 30 minutes due to a "computer fault", leaving sixteen guests stuck on the ride.

== Looney Tunes Carousel ==
- On 5 April 2022, a 12-year-old boy was hospitalised with serious injuries after an accident on the carousel at around 1pm. According to the employee who was operating the carousel at the time of the incident, she noticed the boy was standing rather than sitting on the character he was riding on and immediately hit the emergency stop. The boy's head had entered an open aperture in the ceiling and was pinned between the edge of the aperture and machinery, causing an "ear-to-ear de-scalping injury" and several fractures. An independent safety report provided to the theme park eight months before the incident had identified the aperture as a risk and recommended the installation of plastic brushes to help prevent injury, which the park was considering installing before the incident. However, the park was cleared of any wrongdoing in court in May 2025. The carousel was shut down immediately after the incident and underwent a "hardcore engineering solution" before it re-opened several months later.

== DC Rivals HyperCoaster ==
- On 29 July 2019, a 10-year-old girl was struck in the face by an ibis while riding the DC Rivals Hypercoaster.

== Doomsday Destroyer ==
- On 31 January 2018, the ride safety operating system automatically engaged trapping guests upside down for three minutes. No firefighters or paramedics were called. The ride was due for maintenance in August 2018. The manager said "somehow it engaged by the system wires.

== Arkham Asylum – Shock Therapy ==
- On 10 January 2017, around noon, the coaster's lift chain malfunctioned, leaving 20 riders stuck on top of the lift hill for 40 minutes. Firefighters used a cherry picker to rescue four of the patrons while the rest descended via a staircase on the lift.

== Police Academy Stunt Show ==
- On 5 February 2003, three experienced pyrotechnic workers suffered serious burns to their faces, bodies and hands in a powerful explosion at the Warner Roadshow Studios on the Gold Coast.

== Guest altercations ==
- In December 2008, a 14-year-old boy was on a field-trip to Movie World when he was knocked down in a crowd, resulting in a broken wrist. He took the park to court, suing them for lost wages, due to him being unable to work as a paperboy with a broken wrist. The park settled out of court in 2010.

== See also ==
- Incidents at Warner Bros. parks
- Amusement park accidents
