= List of incidents at Warner Bros. parks =

The following lists of Incidents that occurred at various Warner Bros. theme parks are organized by resort area:

- List of incidents at Warner Bros. Jungle Habitat
- List of incidents at Warner Bros. Movie World

== See also ==
- Amusement park accidents
