= List of incidents at Herschend parks =

Amusement park incident list

This is a summary of notable incidents that have taken place at amusement parks, water parks or other attractions owned and/or operated by Herschend. This list is not intended to be a comprehensive list of every such event, but only those that have a significant impact on the parks or park operations, or are otherwise significantly newsworthy.

The term incidents refers to major accidents, injuries, or deaths that occur at a Herschend-owned or -operated facility. While these incidents were required to be reported to regulatory authorities due to where they occurred, they usually fall into one of the following categories:

- Caused by negligence on the part of the guest. This can be a refusal to follow specific ride safety instructions, or deliberate intent to break park rules.
- The result of a guest's known, or unknown, health issues.
- Negligence on the part of the park, either by ride operator or maintenance.
- Act of God or a generic accident (e.g. slipping and falling), that is not a direct result of an action on anybody's part.

== Adventureland (Iowa) ==
=== Dragon ===
- On June 8, 1991, four riders were injured when the chain lift broke. All of them were released from the hospital after treatment of their injuries; the ride was repaired.
- On August 5, 2018, an employee was struck by a roller coaster car and was hospitalized with injuries to his arm. The park was fined over $37,000 by the Occupational Safety and Health Administration following the incident.

=== Lighthouse ===
- On August 23, 1978, a 15-year-old employee suffered head injuries when he backed into the ride while it was still in motion.

=== Raging River ===
- On June 7, 2016, a 68-year-old Oklahoma man started working at the park as a seasonal employee. On his sixth day, he fell into the conveyor belt which moved the boats through the loading station, suffered a traumatic brain injury, and later fell into a coma. He was taken to Mercy Medical Center in Des Moines and died three days later from his injuries.
- On July 3, 2021, a raft on Raging River carrying six passengers overturned, sending four guests to a local hospital with severe injuries. One passenger, an 11-year-old boy, later died. The ride was inspected the day before the incident and was found to be in normal working order. A trial was held in June 2025.

=== Sky Seats ===
- On August 19, 1990, an 18-year-old park employee remained in serious condition at Methodist Medical Center after losing his arm when he got it stuck in the ride's mechanism while trying to retrieve his cigarette lighter.

=== Tornado ===
- On July 24, 2006, three people were injured when a piece of wood left over from ride inspections fell onto the car in which they were riding. One person was treated at the park's first aid center, another at a local hospital, and the third left without being hospitalized.

=== The Underground ===
- On July 30, 2019, a child's foot became lodged between the ride's vehicle and the loading platform. An operator emergency stopped the ride and the park's security staff called EMS to help get the child off the ride. The victim was taken to a local hospital where he was treated for ankle injuries. The ride was inspected and found to be operating normally.

== Dollywood ==
=== Dollywood Express ===
- On April 14, 2004, a female passenger fell out of one of the train's carriages while it was in motion. An investigation determined that a drink was spilled on the woman, who then lost her balance and fell out of the train. The attraction was closed after the incident but was re-opened the next day after it was determined to be operating normally. The passenger was taken to UT Medical Center in Knoxville, Tennessee, and was released a day later.
- On October 18, 2020, Locomotive No. 70 was being prepped for service when a grease fire started on the side of the engine, the fire was quickly put out and there were no injuries that occurred.
- On October 1, 2023, one of the steam locomotives was hauling a passenger train around the park when one of the passenger cars derailed due to a mechanical issue of a track switch, there were no injuries and the passengers were safety evacuated.

=== FireChaser Express ===
- On April 23, 2019, 40 passengers were stranded for 20 minutes when the safety sensor tripped.
- On May 22, 2021, at approximately 2:50 P.M, two full trains of passengers were stranded for two hours after a flywheel was flung from the switch track just outside of the ride's station.

=== Lightning Rod ===
- On June 13, 2016, after grand opening, the coaster was shut down temporarily due to a nation-wide mechanical recall.

=== Mountain Blown Glass Shop ===
- On July 12, 2020, a craftsman suffered injuries while working on a project inside the shop. It was the second incident that occurred at the park during that year, occurring only a day after a themed decoration fell on top of three people.

=== Parking lot ===
- On June 29, 2019, a parking lot tram collided with another, injuring at least 22 guests. Six people were taken to a nearby hospital by ambulance.

=== Thunder Express ===
- In 1989, on opening day, an incoming train bumped a second train parked in the station, slightly injuring 18 people.

=== Timber Tower ===
- On June 18, 2007, 44 people were stuck on Timber Tower for several hours.

=== Waltzing Swinger ===
- In December 2013, a woman suffered a brain injury after falling from the ride.

=== Wilderness Pass ===
- On July 11, 2020, three guests were injured when a chain decoration fell on top of them as they were walking in the themed area of the park near the Mystery Mine attraction. Two of them were taken to the hospital while another person, who was also involved in the incident, declined transport.

== Dutch Wonderland ==
=== Sky ride ===
- On July 19, 2008, a 44-year-old woman from Ann Arbor, Michigan, lost about a centimeter off the tip of her left index finger when it was caught in the safety bar.

== Idlewild ==
=== Rollo Coaster ===
- On August 12, 2016, a 3-year-old boy was injured when he fell out of the coaster train. He was airlifted to Children's Hospital in Pittsburgh. The ride remained closed for two years before reopening again to the public in 2018 with new coaster trains and improved safety features.

== Kennywood ==
=== Aero 360 ===
- On May 30, 2022, multiple riders were left suspended upside-down in midair when the ride stopped unexpectedly. Maintenance workers returned the ride to its loading position after several minutes. No injuries were reported, though 3 passengers visited the park's first aid office as precaution. The ride was closed for nearly one month for inspection following the incident.

=== Cuddle Up ===
- On May 30, 1979, a 6-year-old boy was thrown from the cup-shaped car after putting his arms up. He later died from his injuries at Braddock General Hospital. On March 18, 1980, his mother won $20,000 in a court settlement alleging wrongful death. Though it was unclear how the accident occurred, the park added safety measures to the ride vehicles and increased its height requirement.

=== Jack Rabbit ===
- On August 18, 2016, a 13-year-old boy collapsed while waiting in line to ride the roller coaster. He was treated by paramedics once they arrived and was taken to UPMC Children's Hospital by ambulance.

=== Journey with Thomas ===
- On July 31, 2018, soon after the grand opening of the area called Thomas Town, the railway train derailed. No guests were injured, but the ride closed for examination and repairs.
- On August 2, 2018, the Thomas Town train derailed for the second time in a week. No injuries were reported.

=== King Kahuna ===
- On July 6, 2008, twenty riders were stranded upside down for ten minutes when the ride malfunctioned and unexpectedly stopped for an undetermined reason. One of the riders sued Kennywood for negligence, claiming that the ride caused spinal damage. On March 26, 2013, a jury ruled that the plaintiff had a pre-existing spinal condition, and that any injury she suffered was not due to the ride.

=== Grand Carousel (Merry-Go-Round) ===
- On August 8, 2020, a woman was taken to the hospital after having a “non-ride related medical emergency” near the attraction.

=== Pirate ===
- On August 1, 2018, several passengers were stuck on the ride when it malfunctioned after its brakes failed, causing it to keep swinging with them on board. The operator maintaining the ride couldn't make it stop and had to wait for about 10 minutes in order for it to respond. No injuries were reported, but some guests that were riding when they got off were complaining of being nauseated and other situations.

=== Popover ===
- On August 7, 1968, a 15-year-old girl from Monongahela, Pennsylvania died and another 15-year-old girl from Monessen, Pennsylvania was seriously injured after falling 30 feet (9.1 m) from the ride when a bolt supporting one of the cages broke.

=== Raging Rapids ===
- On July 25, 1989, two rafts collided, throwing passengers off the ride. A park spokesperson reported human error as the cause. The ride temporarily ceased operation that same day and reopened the next day after safety inspections were made.
- On May 12, 1991, six teenagers were injured when a raft overturned. The accident occurred in 2.5 feet of water and all but one of the riders were treated and released from McKeesport Hospital. The sixth was admitted due to a strained arm and wrist along with swallowing some water.
- In 2012, a 51-year-old woman suffered two broken ribs and a punctured lung after riding.
- On July 2, 2017, a man's eye became infected by a microsporidia parasite. He underwent surgery to remove the parasite, but the operation was only partially successful. A lawsuit was filed claiming the ride's water was "dirty, stagnant, and sludge-like".

=== Steel Phantom ===
- On May 12, 1991, two days after its grand opening, the ride was temporarily shut down for maintenance after several riders complained of neck pain. Park officials determined it was running too fast. Trim brakes were added to slow it down and the coaster reopened on May 23, 1991.

=== Swing Around ===
- On July 12, 2002, the ride continuously ran its cycle for nearly 30 minutes with passengers onboard after a power surge caused a malfunction that prevented the ride from being stopped. The cycle began around 10:10pm and ended around 10:38pm. Before the incident, ride operators ran a test cycle which functioned normally. Deeming the ride in working order, the operators allowed passengers aboard. The ride was eventually safely brought to stop with assistance from a Kennywood supervisor. According to a park source, a similar malfunction occurred a few years earlier. No injuries were reported, but a few riders were nauseated due to motion sickness.

=== Thunderbolt ===
- On May 17, 1968, a 15-year-old boy from Greensburg, Pennsylvania fell to his death after standing up on the ride.
- On July 9, 1999, there was an accident on the Thunderbolt when operators failed to brake an incoming train, which collided with the train being loaded. 35 people were injured in the crash. After the accident, the headlights on the cars were partially removed because the electrical system did not hold up well against the vibration of the cars.

=== The Whip ===
- On May 31, 2002, a 29-year-old woman from Monroeville, Pennsylvania, was killed when the wooden roof of the pavilion housing The Whip collapsed during a microburst, pinning her against an iron fence. In 2007, the woman's family was awarded $1.2 million in damages. In 2010, both Kennywood and Landau Building Co., the contractor that built the pavilion, were found liable and paid $1.295 million and $650,000 to the family, respectively.

== Kentucky Kingdom ==
=== Chang ===
- On April 5, 1997, one day after the ride's official grand opening, a malfunction occurred on the lift hill chain, abruptly stopping the coaster train on its incline and necessitating an evacuation of passengers. The ride was temporarily shut down and remained closed for the remainder of the week.

=== Hurricane Bay ===
- On June 22, 2019, three people were riding the Deluge waterslide when their raft grazed an empty raft that was being removed. One of the riders was taken to a nearby hospital after complaining of neck pain.

=== Mile High Falls ===
- On July 28, 2018, a boat carrying 13 passengers derailed just after it descended down the drop. Five people were taken to the park's first aid center where two were treated with minor injuries. Two more were taken to a local hospital. Park employees shifted the boat back into place. The ride was closed for inspection and reopened a few days later.

=== Starchaser ===
- On July 26, 1994, five unidentified riders were injured when two cars collided in an incident inspectors attributed to operator error. After the accident, the park sued Louisville, Kentucky, television station WHAS-TV for misleading and malicious reporting about it. The station had inaccurately reported that the ride malfunctioned, was dangerous, and that the park had removed a "key component" of the ride. The station lost the lawsuit and was ordered to pay US$3 million to the park.

=== Superman: Tower of Power ===
- On June 21, 2007, a 13-year-old girl from Louisville, Kentucky had both feet amputated above the ankle when a cable snapped during operation. In reaction, at least nine similar rides around the world were closed for inspection at Gröna Lund in Stockholm, Sweden, Kennywood in Pittsburgh, and at parks run by Six Flags, Cedar Fair, and PARC Management. On July 3, 2007, the victim's family announced that doctors reattached her right foot. However, her left leg was amputated below the knee.

On July 13, 2007, the family filed a lawsuit for unspecified damages, claiming the park did not properly maintain the ride. On November 29, 2007, a judge in the Jefferson Circuit Court said that Six Flags could dismantle the ride beginning February 1, 2008. As of December 1, 2007, the ride's cable was still in storage awaiting lab tests. On May 30, 2008, the Kentucky Department of Agriculture released its report on the accident, concluding the cause was a deteriorated cable and poor operator training. Had the operator timely used the emergency, the report states, the victim would have only suffered minor injuries. The report also stated that the park was fined $1,000 for not properly maintaining the ride. Park officials admitted in deposition that it inspected the cables only visually, not hands-on, and that cables were not lubricated monthly or regularly replaced. However, it was not possible to determine any one factor which specifically caused the cable to snap. On November 21, 2008, a settlement to "provide lifetime care" was reached between Kentucky Kingdom and the victim's family.

=== T3 ===
- On July 29, 1997, 14 passengers were left stranded on the roller coaster for more than four hours after the train stopped on the lift hill. All were safely evacuated off the ride and lowered 75 feet (23 m) to the ground.
- On June 2, 2018, two trains collided in the station. Five guests were treated at the park's health center, and one of those riders were subsequently taken to the hospital. The ride reopened two days later but running only one train instead of two, pending further investigation. A park spokesperson stated that they believe the accident may have been caused due to a lightning strike that may have affected the coaster's electronic systems.
- On August 25, 2018, a woman was hit in the face by one of her accessories she brought into the park while riding the roller coaster. She suffered a cut on her temple and was taken to the hospital for treatment and recovered. The ride was shut down for inspection and later reopened.

=== Vampire ===
- On July 22, 1990, 24 passengers had to be evacuated by going down a staircase on the side of the tracks after the train stopped on one of its inversions. A park spokesperson claimed that the coaster's brakes were automatically triggered by a safety device due to the tracks being wet at the time the ride was in operation.
- On April 7, 1999, the ride stranded 27 people 60 feet (18 m) for as long as four hours. For the inconvenience, the staff gave the riders stuffed animals and water bottles. The incident was the result of a malfunction in the ride's automatic braking system.
- On May 29, 1999, the ride stranded 26 people for four hours. It was similar to the incident that happened one month before. Firemen were able to get the riders off using cherry pickers, and nobody was injured.

== Lake Compounce ==
=== Boulder Dash ===
- On June 13, 2001, a train from the Boulder Dash rollercoaster ride was sent on a 60 mph (97 km/h) preliminary run when it struck and killed a 23-year-old groundskeeper who had been cutting weeds by the side of the ride.

=== Gillette Railway ===
- On August 4, 1986, several riders were injured after two train engines collided at a switching station. Four people were taken to Bristol Hospital for treatment while one was treated at the park's first aid center. Investigators determined that the accident was caused by operator error. The ride resumed operation that evening with only one train engine running as the other needed repairs.

=== Lake Plunge ===
- On July 1, 2000, a 6-year-old boy fell into the lake when the tube he had used on the Lake Plunge water slide overturned. The boy was found unconscious after a twenty-minute search and died six days later as a result of the injuries. In response, Lake Compounce made stricter safety precautions and made life jackets a requirement for children.

=== Miniature Golf Course ===
- On May 16, 2004, a 5-year-old boy was killed when he was struck by a fallen tree branch from a decaying 80-foot red oak tree that hung above the park's miniature golf course.

=== The Tornado ===
- On August 20, 1999, a 16-year-old park employee was knocked over and then crushed by the Tornado ride. The employee died from his injuries 10 hours later.

=== Wildcat ===
- On July 19, 1981, a 16-year-old girl died after falling from the Wildcat after attempting to stand up.

=== Zoomerang ===
- On July 31, 1997, a month after the ride opened during the same year, 27 people were stranded on the ride for an hour and a half after its emergency system stopped the train the passengers were on as it was on the tracks. All were evacuated and no injuries were reported.
- On June 14, 2001, a train stopped on the ride's cobra roll with 28 people aboard after it somehow continued running on the track while its automatic braking system malfunctioned. Like the previous incident, there were no injuries and everyone was safely evacuated by firefighters. Park officials later determined the incident was caused by a safety sensor malfunction as the ride was shut down for inspection. This incident occurred one day after an employee was killed after being struck by a train from the Boulder Dash roller coaster.

== Silver Dollar City ==
=== Fire in the Hole (1972) ===
- On May 1, 1972, a 67-year-old woman from Rogers, Arkansas, suffered injuries after falling off a car near the end of its run. She was taken to Skaggs Community Hospital after being reported in satisfactory condition due to fracturing her nose and right arm.
- On July 9, 1980, 23-year-old James Fredrick Polley was killed and a 27-year-old woman injured while riding Fire in the Hole. A train on the roller coaster was accidentally switched to a maintenance track and storage area, which had low-hanging structures across the track. The male passenger's head struck one of these structures, killing him. The accident was ruled a case of human error, and after an investigation, the attraction reopened two days later. The overhanging structures were later removed from the maintenance area.

=== Frisco Silver Dollar Line Steam Train ===
- On October 26, 2022, six park guests and one employee were injured when the Frisco Silver Dollar Line Steam Train derailed as it was rounding a corner causing three passenger cars to overturn.

=== Lost River Of The Ozarks ===
- On July 15, 2002, a section of the queue line collapsed, injuring 19 people.

=== Other incidents involving guests ===
- On December 30, 2019, a 64-year-old woman from Lambert, Mississippi, was injured after falling off a parking lot tram. Her husband claimed that she suffered a brain hemorrhage and facial fractures during the incident.

=== Outlaw Run ===
- On July 28, 2015, a 10-year-old girl complained of neck pain after riding the roller coaster. She was taken to a nearby hospital and later recovered.

=== Thunderation ===
- On July 20, 2022, maintenance worker Joshua Outhouse suffered an injury to the head while testing out the coaster, he died in the hospital the following day. The ride closed for two weeks following the incident.

== Silverwood Theme Park ==
=== Corkscrew ===
- On November 29, 2013, a man lost his balance while trying to get into the coaster train and fell 5 feet (1.5 m) from the tracks. He was found unconscious and was attended to by park staff for an hour. He was then taken to a nearby hospital and the ride was shut down for several hours following an investigation.

== Wild Adventures ==
=== Paradise River ===
- On June 3, 2011, Splash Island lifeguards identified an unresponsive 3-year-old girl in Paradise River. A lifeguard, a supervisor and a park security officer performed CPR on the child and revived her before she was transported by emergency medical services to South Georgia Medical Center.

== Former properties ==
=== Ride the Ducks ===
The duck boats operated by Ride the Ducks have been involved in a number of incidents. In July 2010 one of the amphibious vehicles stalled on the Delaware River in Philadelphia, Pennsylvania and was struck by a barge, sinking the duck boat and killing two of the passengers, who were Hungarian tourists. The National Transportation Safety Board determined that the probable cause of the accident was the tugboat operator's inattention to his duties.

On May 8, 2015, a Ride the Ducks boat struck and killed a 68-year-old Beaumont, Texas, woman crossing the street in Philadelphia, Pennsylvania's Chinatown section. Witnesses at the scene say that the woman crossed against a red light while viewing content on a tablet and was struck while in the boat's front blind spot. The incident is still being investigated.

Ride the Ducks was sold to Ripley Entertainment in December 2017. The sale occurred before the Table Rock Lake duck boat accident in July 2018 near Branson, Missouri, where a Ride the Ducks boat sank on Table Rock Lake during a thunderstorm, killing 17 passengers. All locations of the attraction, outside of some locations in Guam, were permanently closed afterward.

== See also ==
- Amusement park accidents
