= List of incidents at independent amusement parks =

This is a summary of notable incidents occurring at all independently owned amusement parks, water parks or theme parks internationally. This is not intended as a comprehensive list of all such events, but only those with significant impact on the parks or park operations, or are otherwise significantly newsworthy.

The term incidents refers to major accidents, injuries, deaths and significant crimes. While these incidents are required to be reported to regulatory authorities for investigation, attraction-related incidents usually fall into one of the following categories:

- Negligence on the part of the park, either by ride operator or maintenance.
- Caused by negligence on the part of the guest. This can be a refusal to follow specific ride safety instructions, or deliberate intent to break park rules.
- The result of a guest's known, or unknown, health issues.
- Act of God or a generic accident (e.g. slipping and falling) that is not a direct result of an action on anyone's part.

== Action Park ==
=== Alpine Slide ===
- On July 8, 1980, a 19-year-old man was killed when his car jumped the track and his head struck a rock. Action Park claimed he was an employee, as a customer death would have to be reported to the state. However, while he previously worked at the ski resort that later became Action Park, he was never employed at Action Park itself.

=== Kayak Experience ===
- On August 1, 1982, a 27-year-old man from Long Island exited his tipped kayak on the Kayak Experience to right it and stepped on a metal grate that was either in contact with or too close to a section of live wiring for underwater fans, causing a severe shock and cardiac arrest. Several of his nearby family members were also injured. He was taken to a hospital in nearby Warwick, New York, where he died of the shock-induced cardiac arrest. The park first disputed that an electric current caused his death, saying there were no burns on his body, but the coroner responded that burns generally do not occur in a water-based electrocution. The ride was drained and closed for the investigation. Accounts differed on the extent of the exposed wiring: the park said it was "just a nick," while others said it was closer to 8 inches (20 cm). The state's Labor Department found that the fan was properly maintained and installed and cleared the park of wrongdoing but also that the current could cause bodily harm under certain circumstances. While the park claimed vindication, it never reopened the ride, saying that people would be afraid to go on it thereafter.

=== Tarzan Swing ===
- In 1984, a fatal heart attack suffered by a visitor was unofficially believed to have been triggered by the shock of the cold water in the pool beneath the Tarzan Swing. The water on the ride and in that swimming area was 50–60 °F (10–16 °C), while other water areas were in the 70–80 °F (21–27 °C) range, more typical of swimming pools. The Tarzan Swing and the Cannonball ride in this area were operated by spring water.

=== Tidal Wave Pool ===
- On July 24, 1982, a 15-year-old boy drowned in the Tidal Wave Pool.
- On August 27, 1984, a 20-year-old from Brooklyn drowned in the Tidal Wave Pool.
- On July 19, 1987, an 18-year-old from Queens drowned in the Tidal Wave Pool.

== Adventuredome ==
=== Canyon Blaster ===
- On July 23, 2008, a 12-year-old girl from Union City, California, was found unconscious after the train returned to the loading station at the conclusion of the ride. She was airlifted to University Medical Center where she was later pronounced dead. An autopsy revealed that she died from a heart attack.

=== El Loco ===
- On March 25, 2019, a woman in her mid-20s was taken to the hospital after sustaining unspecified injuries after being ejected from the ride and falling to the ground. Later reports say that the guest was a double amputee, but it was unclear which limbs this referred to.

== Adventureland Park (New York) ==
=== Haunted Mansion ===
- On August 11, 2007, a 6-year-old boy from Bellmore, New York, got his hand stuck between a moving platform and the sidewall of the attraction. He was rescued by his sister. Though he was not seriously injured, his family filed a $10M lawsuit against the park.
- On August 29, 2008, a 5-year-old girl suffered minor injuries and was taken to a hospital for treatment after a 10-foot prop of a skeleton riding a bicycle on a tightrope fell on top of her.

=== Ladybug Coaster ===
- On August 30, 2005, an 18-year-old employee from North Babylon, New York, was struck by a roller coaster train while performing maintenance on the ride. He died from his injuries the next day at Nassau University Medical Center.

=== Top Scan ===
- On August 31, 2005, a day after the Ladybug Coaster incident, a 45-year-old mentally disabled woman from Long Island was thrown from the Top Scan ride and crashed into a parked car in the parking lot after her safety harness gave way. She died from her injuries and the ride permanently ceased operations.

== Adventure Park at Grants Mill ==
- On May 10, 2018, the park management closed the park permanently and had the attractions dismantled, after receiving 49 code violations from city and fire inspections. Most of the violations were related to exposed wiring. The park originally opened on October 5, 2013.

== Adventure World ==
=== Sky Lift ===
- On March 30, 2014, 20 passengers were stuck on the Sky Lift due to a safety malfunction and were evacuated off the ride by firefighters. No injuries were reported.
- On January 5, 2016, a woman fell 3 metres (9.8 f) from the ride while trying to secure her son into his seat. It was reported that she was being careless and didn't follow the ride operator's instructions before getting on the ride.

=== The Kraken ===
- On November 18, 2017, a teenage boy broke his tibia when two rafts collided, causing him to be flung towards the exit funnel.

== Askari Amusement Park ==
=== Discovery ===
- On July 15, 2018, a 12-year-old girl was killed and 25 other people were injured when the ride collapsed in mid-air. The park (which officially opened a month before the incident) did not reopen to the public until February 13, 2019, six months after the incident occurred.

== Bay Beach Amusement Park ==
=== Zippin Pippin ===
- On June 20, 2016, a roller coaster train carrying three people collided with an empty train in the station. The riders suffered minor injuries and were taken to a local hospital. The ride remained closed following an inspection and reopened a week later.

== Beech Bend Park ==
=== Dragon Coaster ===
- On August 16, 2015, the ride derailed after a safety malfunction. There were no injuries reported.

=== Jet Star ===
- On August 30, 1975, a 17-year-old park employee was fatally struck in the head by a moving car while he and some other workers were trying to remove blocks beneath the ride prior to opening. He was taken to Bowling Green-Warren County Hospital and was pronounced dead after arrival.

=== Jitterbug ===
- On July 26, 2015, 12 people suffered injuries when the ride tipped over. They were all taken to a local hospital and later released.

== Bell's Amusement Park ==
=== Wildcat ===
- On April 20, 1997, a malfunction occurred on the ride after a coaster train that was near the top of the lift hill suddenly disengaged, rolled backward, and collided with another train. A 14-year-old boy was killed while six other people suffered injuries.

== Belmont Park ==
=== Giant Dipper ===
- On December 9, 2006, a maintenance worker fell 18 feet (5.5 m) from the roller coaster. He was tied to a safety wire at the time of the incident. He was taken to the hospital and later released. The ride remained closed for a week.

== Blue Bayou and Dixie Landin' ==
=== Over The Rainbow ===
- On June 9, 2006, a 4-year-old boy was injured after falling 25 feet (7.6 m) from his seat on the ride. His mother wanted to sit next to him, but the seat she wanted to sit on wasn't working properly. As soon as the ride started, the boy felt some jerking movement from his seat and he fell from the ride. The boy's parents sued the park afterward.

=== Xtreme ===
- On July 11, 2010, a 21-year-old woman from Lafayette, Louisiana, fell 30 feet (9.1 m) from the roller coaster. She was taken to the hospital and later died from her injuries. Investigators could not determine whether the ride's restraint system malfunctioned or was improperly fastened. The ride was inspected before opening but remained closed after the accident.

== Branson Mountain Adventure Park ==
=== Runaway Mountain Coaster ===
- On October 4, 2018, three people were taken to the emergency room after they suffered minor injuries when two cars collided on the tracks. The attraction was closed at the time for a private event. It reopened the next day after being inspected.

== Calaway Park ==
=== Theodore Tugboat play area ===
- On August 4, 2014, a mother filed a report to the park after her 18-month old daughter suffered second degree burns to her feet while playing at the Theodore Tugboat play area. Removal of shoes was required for the attraction, and due to high temperatures that day the rubber mats, directly exposed to sunlight, became hot enough to cause injury. The child was taken to the park's first aid area and had her feet bandaged. The attraction was closed permanently and removed in December 2014.

== Camden Park ==
=== Slingshot ===
- On May 12, 2018, a park employee was injured when he was pinned under the ride. He was taken to the hospital and received stitches.

=== Spider ===
- On July 23, 2011, three riders suffered minor injuries and were taken to the hospital after one of the ride's legs malfunctioned and broke apart.

== Canobie Lake Park ==
=== Guest altercations ===
- On June 16, 2014, a family from Sutton, Vermont, attacked several police officers after being told that they were not allowed to bring any weapons or any other harmful devices into the park. Three people were charged with felony riot.

=== Rocket Man: The Human Cannonball ===
- On August 6, 2016, a stuntman who was performing during the show fell 20 feet off a safety net. He was unharmed but was taken to an emergency room for an evaluation.

=== Yankee Cannonball ===
- On July 27, 2001, five people were injured when two trains collided.

== Casino Pier ==
=== Crazy Bus ===
- On July 5, 2018, a 51-year-old woman from Philadelphia, Pennsylvania, suffered minor injuries when she fell as she was taking her children off the ride. She was taken to nearby Community Medical Center. The ride was shut down for inspection.

=== Go-Karts ===
- On August 25, 2018, a 21-year-old woman was sent to Jersey Shore University Medical Center after losing consciousness while riding. The go-kart she was driving crashed into a wall of the track, injuring her. The ride was shut down for inspection and later reopened.

=== Jet Star ===
- On June 19, 1994, a worker was reported to be in fair condition at Jersey Shore Medical Center after being hit by a car during a test run. He was lubricating the tracks when another employee, unaware of his presence there, released a test car.

=== Sky Ride ===
- On July 11, 1997, two people were injured when they fell from the Sky Ride after trying to help a 4-year-old boy when his mother exited the ride.
- On July 7, 2012, a 17-year-old girl jumped off her seat from Sky Ride during a thunderstorm, and fell on the beach, suffering multiple bruises.

=== Star Jet ===
- On July 13, 2008, a 21-year-old park employee from Pleven, Bulgaria died from his injuries at Jersey Shore University Medical Center in Neptune, NJ after he was struck by a roller coaster train while retrieving a customer's hat from the restricted area of the ride.
- On October 29, 2012, strong waves and winds from Hurricane Sandy destroyed part of the pier and Star Jet was thrown into the ocean, leading to it being heavily damaged beyond repair, becoming a symbol of the storm's damage.

== Castle Park ==
=== Saw Mill Plunge ===
- On May 25, 2019, three people were injured when the ride malfunctioned, throwing them into the water. One was critically injured while the others suffered minor injuries; all were taken to Riverside Community Hospital for treatment. According to park staff, the mechanical pump that was used to operate the ride had a mechanical failure. The ride remained closed following an inspection.

== Castles N' Coasters ==
=== Bumper Boats ===
- On March 30, 2015, two young boys suffered burns when the bumper boat they were in caught fire.

=== Desert Storm ===
- On June 26, 2016, three people were stuck on the roller coaster and had to be evacuated by firefighters when the train got stuck on the tracks. No injuries were reported.
- On May 15, 2021, 22 people were evacuated from Desert Storm after the train they were on stalled halfway through the ride.

=== Splashdown ===
- On November 28, 2015, a 12-year-old boy was seriously injured after falling from a water log flume ride after standing up during the ride. He required emergency brain surgery.

== Chaohua Park ==
=== Travel Through Space ===
- On February 3, 2017, a 13-year-old girl was flung from the ride and suffered fatal injuries. Footage of the incident recorded by mobile phone later went viral on the Internet. It was later determined that her seatbelt was broken and the safety bar did not fit tightly enough to keep her safe. Two days after the accident, authorities announced that all rides of the same type will cease operation while an investigation is conducted.

== Children's Garden ==
- In July 2017, three people were injured when a rope walkway collapsed.

=== Water Slide ===
- On May 4, 2019, 2 people were killed and 12 injured when they fell from the slide.

== Clementon Amusement Park ==
=== Jack Rabbit ===
- On August 5, 1998, three people were injured after the coaster's train derailed and crashed into the park's management office.

== Coney Island amusement areas ==
=== Cyclone ===
- On August 23, 1988, a 26-year-old man was killed after falling from the Cyclone. The man, a maintenance worker and the only passenger at the time, was riding in the back seat of the train during his lunch break. Apparently, he eluded the safety bar and was seen standing up as the train began its descent down the first hill. He fell 30 feet (9.1 m) and landed on a crossbeam of a lower section of track. He was killed instantly. The ride was closed following the incident but reopened a day later after safety inspectors concluded that the ride was safe.
- On July 31, 2007, a 53-year-old man broke several vertebrae while riding the Cyclone. He died four days later due to complications from surgery.
- On March 30, 2015, a 52-year-old woman from Tucson, Arizona, was awarded $1.5M in a lawsuit after being severely injured while riding the coaster in June 2008. The lawsuit claimed that she sprained her neck.
- In March 2018, a 42-year-old man was struck in the neck by a 5-inch (12.7 cm) long metal bolt while waiting in the ride queue.

=== Guest accidents ===
- On June 12, 2005, a 24-year-old man from Queens, New York, drowned at the Coney Island Beach while playing with his friends. He was the third person to die there.
- On July 4, 2005, a 20-year-old man from Sunset Park, New York, drowned at the beach shortly after closing. The victim was airlifted to Coney Island Hospital where he was pronounced dead after arrival.
- On July 22, 2014, police reported that multiple witnesses saw a 10-year-old girl and her 9-year-old sister playing on the jetty at around 6:30 pm at the beach. The 10-year-old fell into the water and drowned. She was pulled out unconscious and airlifted to a nearby hospital in critical condition, but later pronounced dead after arrival at around 8:00 pm. There were no lifeguards on duty when the incident occurred since their shifts ended at 6:00 pm.

=== Hell Hole ===
- On July 30, 1995, 13 people were injured when the passenger compartment of the ride came apart after it spun out of control. Most injuries occurred as people tumbled to the floor of the ride's barrel after a park operator pressed the emergency stop button. A female passenger was severely injured when her leg became tangled in the wreckage when the barrel suddenly gave way. City officials reported that the ride had passed a safety inspection in April of that year.

=== Himalaya ===
- On June 12, 1999, a 17-year-old girl was killed and 8 others were injured when a car flew off the ride.

=== Jumbo Jet ===
- On May 25, 1996, the bolts on a rear wheel from the first car of the train came loose, causing it to derail and hit a nearby pole. Two people suffered injuries in the accident and were reportedly in stable condition with cuts and bruises.

=== Polar Express ===
- On August 5, 2007, a restraining lap bar broke causing an unidentified 15-year-old girl to fall out of her seat and into the center of the ride where she was briefly knocked unconscious. The ride was running in reverse at the time. The victim was taken to the hospital with head and leg injuries, and complained of neck and back pain.

=== Tornado ===
- On July 11, 1955, a 43-year-old park employee was struck by a moving roller coaster train while trying to inspect the ride. He fell 35 feet (11 m) below to the ground and later died from his injuries. The ride was temporarily shut down.

== Conneaut Lake Park ==
=== Blue Streak ===
- On July 24, 1949, a 40-year-old man was killed after falling 20 feet (6.1 m) from the ride. Park officials stated that the safety restraints were not properly secured.
- On October 29, 2013, two women were injured after riding the roller coaster. Reports said they may have hit their faces on the lap bar during their ride.

== Cowabunga Bay Water Park ==
=== Surf-A-Rama Wave Pool ===
- On May 27, 2015, a 6-year-old boy nearly drowned in the wave pool. His parents filed a lawsuit against the park saying there were insufficient lifeguards on duty while watching the guests and no children were wearing life jackets. The boy suffered a brain injury shortly after the incident.
- On June 19, 2017, an 8-year-old boy was found unresponsive and pulled from the water at the park's wave pool by a lifeguard who tried to revive him by performing CPR. He died after being taken to Sunrise Hospital.

== Daytona Beach Boardwalk ==
=== Sand Blaster ===
- On June 14, 2018, twelve guests were injured when the train derailed, with eight being taken to the hospital. Two of those guests fell 34 feet (10 m) to the ground from the train that was dangling from the track. FDACS hired an engineering firm to investigate the case. They found that the primary cause was the speed, however there were also rust on the tracks and issues with the seatbelts. Several victims who hired lawyers reportedly received compensation.

== Daytona Lagoon ==
=== Treasure Lagoon ===
- On August 3, 2019, a 5-year-old was pulled out of the water after drowning in the park's wave pool. Lifeguards attempted to revive the victim while performing CPR, but the child later died after being taken to Halifax Health Medical Center by ambulance.

== Deno's Wonder Wheel Amusement Park ==
=== Sea Serpent ===
- On August 14, 2013, a 5-year-old boy suffered injuries to his left leg while riding the roller coaster at the park. He climbed out of his lap bar to the back of the car and fell from the tracks to the ground. He was taken to Bellevue Hospital where he was reported to be in critical condition.

== Dreamworld ==
=== Rocky Hollow Log Ride ===
- On April 16, 2016, an 18-year-old man fell from the boat he was riding and was run over by two other boats. The man reportedly stood up during the ride. He was left unconscious in the water where he nearly drowned. He suffered injuries to his head, neck, rib, ankle and suffered acute respiratory failure. The ride closed for several days before reopening, then closed again from 2016 to 2018 after the Thunder River Rapids Ride incident, and closed permanently in 2020.

=== Thunder River Rapids Ride ===
- On October 25, 2016, four people – two men aged 35 and 38, and two women aged 32 and 42 – were killed when the raft they were riding collided with another raft that had stopped due to low water pressure. The raft was forced into an upright position and violently shaken by the still-moving conveyor belt. Eyewitness accounts noted that the water level in the channel dropped before the incident, but the drop did not trigger a sensor that would stop the ride. Of six passengers aboard the raft, two children aged 10 and 12 survived by holding onto the upright raft and climbed to safety with the assistance of a bystander. Two casualties suffered fatal crushing injuries after falling from the upright raft into the conveyor belt. The other two casualties seated closest to the conveyor were pulled into the belt and trapped where they later died from their injuries. Dreamworld officials stated that the ride had just passed its annual inspection in September. On November 9, Ardent Leisure chief executive Deborah Thomas announced that the ride would be permanently closed and demolished. The park was closed for six weeks following the accident. Further investigation indicates that the incident occurred when one of two water pumps on the attraction failed.

== Expoland (Japan) ==
=== Fujin Raijin II ===
- On May 5, 2007, a 19-year-old from Higashiomi, Shiga was killed and nineteen other guests injured when the Fujin Raijin II derailed at Expoland in Suita, Osaka. An investigation revealed that the ride derailed due to a broken axle. None of the ride vehicle's axles had been replaced for fifteen years. Following this accident, similar coasters at other Japanese parks were voluntarily shut down and inspected for the same axle flaw. Expoland was cited by authorities for faulty maintenance when similar axle cracks were found on a second train a month later. On July 15, 2008, three former Expoland employees – the director and administrative manager, the head of facility and business department, and the head of the technical division – agreed with the allegation of professional negligence and violating Building Standards Law. They admitted to purposefully postponing the coaster's regular inspection, even though a visible crack was noticed months earlier, and submitting a false inspection report.

== Extreme World ==
=== Terminal Velocity ===
- On July 30, 2010, a 12-year-old girl from Parkland, Florida, fell 100 feet (30 m) from the freefall ride and landed on her back on the ground. She suffered brain damage, severe spinal and pelvic fractures, intestinal lacerations, and other severe injuries. The ride allows riders to free-fall onto a safety net, but the net was not in place when the operator released her, causing her to strike the ground. She was airlifted to the American Family Children's Hospital in Madison, Wisconsin, by helicopter and stayed there for almost 2 months before fully recovering. In October 2010, her parents filed a lawsuit against the park over her injuries and the ride operator was charged in her fall.

== Ferrari World ==
=== Flying Aces ===
- On February 4, 2017, 24 people were stranded on the roller coaster and required evacuation. No injuries were reported. The park suffered extreme weather conditions at the time such as winds up to 47 km/h (29 mph) causing the ride to stop at the lift hill.

== Funland ==
=== Cruisers ===
- On July 24, 2017, a 49-year-old woman from Newburgh, New York, was injured when she fell out of one of the cars used for the attraction after riding with her daughter. She was treated at the scene by paramedics and hospitalized.

=== Superflip 360 ===
- On September 12, 2021, an air compressor tank failed near the Superflip 360 ride, creating "environmental conditions" and flying debris which injured three teenagers waiting in line. A 16-year-old boy suffered serious head injuries from the incident.

== Fun Spot America Orlando ==
=== Screamer ===
- On June 16, 2019, firefighters rescued seven passengers after they became stuck on the ride. No injuries were reported.

== Feria de la Alasita ==
=== Ferris wheel ===
- On October 8, 2025, more than 10 people were injured when a ferris wheel collapsed.

== Galaxyland ==
=== Mindbender ===
- On June 14, 1986, the fourth car of the yellow train derailed before the third and final loop. The train did not clear the loop and slid backward fishtailing wildly and crashing into a concrete pillar. Damage from the derailment caused the lap bars to disengage at some point, throwing its four passengers at least 25 feet (7.6 m) to the floor below. Three passengers died while a fourth was critically injured. About 19 others were treated for less severe injuries at the nearby Misericordia Community Hospital. An investigation determined that bolts on the left wheel assembly had come loose, causing the accident, and that design flaws by Schwarzkopf, along with a lack of maintenance by the mall, were likely to blame. When Mindbender reopened in January 1987, the trains were redesigned. Existing four-car trains were converted to three-car trains (reducing seating capacity from 16 to 12), and anti-rollback features were installed. The lap bar restraint was retained, but seat belts and shoulder headrests were added.
- On August 2, 1995, a park employee was injured and suffered multiple lacerations after being struck by a coaster train while trying to find a pair of glasses that had been dropped by one of the guests on the ride.

== Gillians Wonderland Pier ==
=== Canyon Falls Log Flume ===
- On July 23, 2007, five people suffered minor injuries when one of the logs apparently slid backward, colliding with another. A loose bolt was believed to be the exact cause of the incident according to a park spokesperson.

=== Speedway ===
- On August 25, 2013, a 4-year-old girl from Marlton, New Jersey, was ejected from the ride and injured. She was thrown off the ride's platform after a sharp turn and became pinned underneath a ride vehicle. According to the girl's uncle, the incident was caused when the operator maintaining the ride did not check that the girl was buckled in. Park officials fired the person afterward.

=== Wild Wonder ===
- On August 28, 1999, a roller coaster train carrying two people came to a stop on the lift hill 35 feet (11 m) above the ground. The poorly maintained third-party anti-rollback device caused the train to descend down the lift hill towards the station. A 39-year-old mother and her 8-year-old daughter from Pomona, New York, were sitting in the front row and were ejected at a sharp turn at the bottom of the lift hill. The train crashed into another in the station, injuring guests on the second train. The two ejected victims were pronounced dead at nearby Shore Medical Center in Somers Point, New Jersey. This accident caused the state of New Jersey to change its fine for an amusement ride law violation from $500 to $5,000.

== Gilroy Gardens ==
=== Sky Trail Monorail ===
- On July 25, 2017, nine passengers were stuck on the monorail when it broke down during the afternoon and were stranded 35 feet (10.7 m) in the air. Firefighters rescued the passengers immediately. No injuries were reported.

== Glenwood Caverns Adventure Park ==
=== Haunted Mine Drop ===
- On September 5, 2021, a 6-year-old girl suffered fatal injuries after falling off the ride. Reports indicated that during boarding, the girl sat atop an already-buckled seat belt. As the ride's computer registered the restraint as buckled, and the rod which holds the restraint in place was properly inserted, ride operators assumed the seat belt was placed correctly and dispatched the ride, failing to visually confirm the placement of the seat belt. The girl fell 110 feet (34 m) as a result. The ride and its safety systems were functioning properly, and passed inspection prior to the incident. The park remained closed for two days while an investigation was conducted following the accident. A lawsuit was filed a month later.

== Go Bananas ==
=== Guest altercations ===
- On August 25, 2018, a brawl between two women occurred inside the amusement center during a child's birthday party. The fight was recorded on a cellphone and uploaded to Facebook and other online media platforms two days later, going viral and triggering a petition to shut down the venue.

=== Python Pit ===
- On April 2, 2011, a 3-year-old boy from Dolton, Illinois, was killed while riding the kiddie coaster with his twin brother at the indoor amusement center. He fell 3 to 4 feet (0.9 to 1.2 m) off the ride after being ejected from his safety restraints, was struck by a moving train, and was wedged between one of the cars. The boy was pronounced dead on scene according to the Cook County Medical Examiner's office. His twin brother was not injured and got off the ride safely once the train returned to the station. The facility was shut down for a brief time shortly after, but later re-opened.

== Great Wolf Lodge ==
=== Minneapolis location ===
- On May 22, 2006, a 39-year-old man from Lakeville, Minnesota, suffered a bruised spinal cord while attempting to ride the FlowRider wave ride on a boogie board. As a result, the man had two titanium screws and a plate inserted into his neck to stabilize vertebrae and relieve pressure on his spinal cord. Doctor reports stated that the victim was almost paralyzed, but regained some movement in his limbs shortly after surgery.

=== Traverse City location ===
- On August 20, 2008, a 6-year-old boy from Livonia, Michigan, fell off one of the lily pads used for the Big Foot Pass attraction inside the water park, hitting his head and falling into the water. His father and one of the lifeguards tried to revive him by performing CPR, but he later died from his injuries after being taken to Munson Medical Center.

=== Williamsburg location ===
- On June 17, 2007, a 5-year-old girl from Wakefield, Virginia, was found unresponsive in one of the pools inside the waterpark while visiting the resort for Father's Day weekend. She was pulled from the water and taken to the Children's Hospital of The King's Daughters in Norfolk where she was pronounced dead after arrival.

== Gröna Lund ==
=== Jetline ===
- On June 25, 2023, a train partially derailed, resulting in one death and nine injuries. An investigation by the Swedish Accident Investigation Authority (SHK) found an improperly manufactured replacement control arm caused the derailment, leading to the permanent closure and later demolition of the ride.

== Hersheypark ==
- In 2006, of the 1.4 million visitors to the park, 55 people were injured at Hersheypark.

=== The Boardwalk at Hersheypark ===
- On July 24, 2025, a 9-year-old child died while using the wave pool. The child did not know how to swim and had a phobia of deep water. The drowning occurred when the chaperoning father left the child and her friend (his child) alone for 5 minutes to put belongings in a locker. The drowning child was being pulled from the water by lifeguards upon his return. After being rescued by lifeguards, the child was transported to Milton S. Hershey Medical Center, but did not recover. The pool remained closed the following day.

=== Canyon River Rapids ===
- On May 23, 1987, four people were injured when their raft overturned slightly. A park spokesperson claimed that the incident occurred because a section of the waterway through which the rafts travel was too wide. The ride was closed for two weeks after an investigation and later re-opened with a narrower section of the waterway allowing for the rafts to safely go through.

=== Flying Coaster ===
- On June 24, 1968, two girls from Manheim, Pennsylvania, suffered back injuries as they were thrown 6 feet (1.8 m) off the ride after finishing its run. They were both taken to Good Samaritan Hospital for treatment. The incident was caused by a hydraulic gear malfunctioning.

=== Great Bear ===
- On July 4, 1998, a 21-year-old college student was charged with negligence after pointing a laser toward a park employee near the coaster. The incident resulted in the worker having blurred vision when the laser was shined directly at his eyes and he complained that he couldn't see properly afterwards.

=== Monorail ===
- On August 30, 2025, a child was reported missing around 5:00 pm. He was subsequently seen walking on the raised Monorail track, approximately 30 feet (9.1 m) above the ground, by parkgoers. The trains were not operating at the time. A bystander climbed onto the roof of a nearby concession stand to reach the boy and lower him to safety. Hersheypark released a statement explaining that the Monorail entrance was chained off and the turnstile was barricaded, but the child managed to gain access to the ride area. No one was harmed in the incident.

=== Sky Ride ===
- On June 3, 1977, a 29-year-old painter was caught in the ride's cable system when someone accidentally started the ride. The rescue operation took more than an hour. The victim, who suffered two broken legs, was taken to Hershey Medical Center.

=== SooperDooperLooper ===
- On August 25, 1977, a 16-year-old worker died at Hershey Medical Center after being struck by one of the coaster's cars.
- On May 2, 1988, a 22-year-old man was injured after falling 20 feet (6.1 m) off the ride onto a cement pier. He suffered a broken leg, pelvis, ankle, several ribs, and a punctured lung. He recovered at Hershey Medical Center. He attempted to sue, but was not awarded any damages as he had lifted the safety bar and stood up during the ride.

=== Storm Runner ===
- On June 26, 2018, a 9-year-old boy's safety harness allegedly could not be properly secured when he was boarding a train. His father, seated next to him, shouted for assistance, but no worker came to help. As the ride began to move, the boy jumped from the train onto the exit platform. It was revealed that he and his father have suffered anxiety-like symptoms as a result of the incident. A lawsuit alleging negligence was filed on July 2, 2020.

=== Tidal Force ===
- On May 30, 1994, a 16-year-old boy injured one of his wrists after being thrown 6 feet (1.8 m) by a wave as he exited the ride. He was slammed into a metal fence, receiving cuts on his forehead and wrists that required stitches. The ride was adjusted by redirecting the wave to fall on top of the patrons instead of striking them from the front.
- On June 11, 1995, a man suffered injuries after a wave slammed him against a pillar as he was trying to exit the ride.

=== Timber Rattler ===
- On May 12, 1984, two children suffered injuries after falling from the ride. Park officials stated that there were no mechanical problems and that the ride had already been inspected beforehand, but extra restraints were later installed onto each gondola.

=== Wild Cat ===
- On May 30, 1929, two cars on a coaster train bumped into each other when one was stuck on top of the lift hill. One car had hit a safety device which prevented the train from going down the tracks. 30 passengers had to be evacuated off the ride including three people who were treated at local hospitals for injuries sustained in the accident.

== Holiday World & Splashin' Safari ==
=== Bahari River ===
- On June 20, 2009, a filter pump on Bahari River malfunctioned, sending 24 guests and employees to the hospital. At 6:25 pm, the pump was turned from off to on. The pump surged, forcing a stronger-than-usual concentration of liquid bleach and hydrochloric acid into the water. 24 people, including park staff and medical personnel, complained of troubled breathing and nausea. They were given oxygen at the park before being transported to Jasper Memorial Hospital for treatment. All were treated and released that evening. It was later determined that an interlock system, designed to prevent chemical feeders from pumping chemicals into the water when the pump was turned off, had malfunctioned.

=== Bomb scare ===
- On June 30, 2016, a suspicious unattended backpack was found, causing an evacuation of the entire park.

=== Lawnmowing accident ===
- On May 27, 2006, a 20-year-old male park employee from Birdseye, Indiana, died after being pinned under the lawnmower he was using. The man was a supervisor for the park's grounds department. The employee was working alone, mowing an area with some inclines outside the east side of the park when the incident occurred, though the park refused to speculate on exactly what might have happened. The man was found by an employee, who lifted the lawnmower off the victim with help from other employees. Park emergency medical technicians and Spencer County EMS summoned a medical helicopter from St. Mary's Hospital and Medical Center in Evansville, Indiana, but the employee was pronounced dead on arrival.

=== The Firecracker ===
- On June 8, 1997, the rear end of the coaster's car bumped into the front after the ride operator did not properly secure the manual brake. Three people who were on the rear end of the car were not injured, while two people on the front suffered minor injuries and were taken to St. Joseph's Hospital in Huntingburg, Indiana, as a precaution.

=== The Raven ===
- On May 31, 2003, a 32-year-old woman from New York City died after falling out of The Raven roller coaster. She was visiting the park to attend "Stark Raven Mad 2003", an event hosting roller coaster enthusiasts from around the United States. At approximately 8:00 pm, the victim and her fiancé boarded The Raven in the last row of the train. Following a safety check of her lap bar and seat belt by a ride operator, the train left the station. Multiple witnesses reported that they saw her "virtually standing up" during the ride's initial and subsequent drops. During the ride's 69 feet (21 m) fifth drop, she was ejected from the car and onto the tracks. When the train returned to the station, the victim's fiancé, ride operators, and a passenger who was a doctor ran back along the tracks to find her lying under the structure of the roller coaster at the fifth drop. The doctor, aided by park medical personnel, began CPR until an ambulance arrived. The victim was pronounced dead en route to St. Joseph's Hospital.

An investigation showed that the safety restraints were working properly and that there were no mechanical deficiencies on the roller coaster. Additionally, the victim's seatbelt was found undone when the train returned to the station. A subsequent 2005 lawsuit filed by the family against Holiday World and the Philadelphia Toboggan Company, the manufacturer of the coaster train, was settled out of court in 2007. Terms of the settlement were not disclosed.

=== The Voyage ===
- On June 4, 2021, a 47-year-old female was found unresponsive when the train she was riding returned to the station. The woman was taken to a nearby hospital, where she was later pronounced dead. The ride was closed for the remainder of the day. It was determined that the woman died from internal bleeding as a result of a torn artery caused by the force of the ride, though the ride was operating normally at the time of the incident.

=== The Wave ===
- On July 4, 2007, at 11:00 a.m., a 29-year-old female from Fort Wayne, Indiana, collapsed near the edge of The Wave, falling face-down into two inches of water. Lifeguards immediately responded and pulled her out, then attempted to revive her with help from park medical personnel. Resuscitation attempts continued as the victim was transported by ambulance to Jasper Memorial Hospital, where she died. An autopsy determined the cause of death to be congestive Heart failure.

== Hopi Hari ==
=== Guest altercations ===
- On September 24, 2014, a group of about 50 youngsters, who paid for their tickets, started a flash rob in the interior of the park, causing havoc and leaving six visitors hurt. Dozens of reports of people having their belongings stolen were left on the park's visiting answering service.

=== Hora Do Horror ===
- On September 28, 2007, a 15-year-old boy was found unconscious and suffered an anaphylaxis attack while inside one of the Hora Do Horror tunnels. Despite being revived after a cardiorespiratory arrest (CRA) by the medical team of the park, he died hours later in the hospital.

=== La Tour Eiffel ===
- On February 24, 2012, 14-year-old Gabriela Yukari Nichimura died after falling from a chair of the La Tour Eiffel. Nichimura fell from a height of 20 meters because she was in a seat that couldn't be utilized and was inactive for many years. Overall, eleven people, including the president of the park were indicted by the Civil Police of São Paulo by culpable homicide. The park was closed for 23 days by the Brazilian Public Ministry for investigations and had to make improvements on the safety of all rides and to reduce working hours for the employees.

== Houston Livestock Show and Rodeo ==
=== Hi-Miler ===
- On March 20, 2011, a lap bar on the Hi-Miler roller coaster at the Houston Livestock Show and Rodeo suddenly unlocked, causing a 47-year-old male guest to fall more than 28 feet (8.5 m) from the roller coaster. The malfunction was caused by a single screw, which was supposed to keep the lock pin in place and the lap bar locked. The victim sustained serious chest and head injuries and later died as a result of his injuries.

=== Power outage ===
- On February 28, 1999, 15 people were stranded on a ride for a few minutes before they were able to get off. No serious injuries were reported, although six people complained of dizziness and neck pain.

== ICON Park ==
=== Orlando FreeFall ===
- On March 24, 2022, Tyre Sampson, a 14-year-old boy visiting Orlando from the St. Louis area, fell to his death from the ride Orlando FreeFall. According to preliminary findings from a forensic engineering team hired by the state of Florida, the safety sensor for the seat he occupied and one other seat were "manually adjusted" by operators to allow for larger riders to occupy those two seats. The adjustments allowed nearly double the normal operating range of the harness restraint. The adjusted position of the sensor allowed the safety sensor light to activate, satisfying the electronic safety mechanisms for the ride, even when the harness was unsafe for the occupant. Investigations into why and by whom the adjustments were made are still ongoing. Sampson's family is pursuing legal action and calling for the ride to be permanently shut down. In October 2022, ICON Park confirmed the demolition of Orlando FreeFall. In December 2022, the Orlando Free Fall ride owners had requested a hearing to appeal a proposed $250,000 fine from the state following its investigation into Tyre Sampson's death.

=== Orlando StarFlyer ===
- On September 14, 2020, a 21-year-old maintenance worker fell about 50 to 60 feet (15 to 18 m) to a lower platform while conducting a daily safety check before the park opened. He was taken to Orlando Regional Medical Center where he died from his injuries.

=== The Wheel ===
- On December 31, 2022, around 6:20 p.m., Orange County Fire and Rescue received a report of a power failure of The Wheel, stranding 62 people on the ride for over three hours. No injuries were reported. The ride was closed and reopened on February 10, 2023.

== Indiana Beach Boardwalk Resort ==
=== Cornball Express ===
- On September 3, 2016, a park employee was injured as he was on the ride. He was taken to a nearby hospital for treatment and later recovered.

=== Hoosier Hurricane ===
- On July 22, 2018, a tree branch fell onto the tracks of the ride and collided with a roller coaster train with passengers on board. No injuries were reported and the ride remained closed for inspection.
- On June 28, 2019, a 12-year-old boy from Lafayette, Indiana, suffered a medical emergency while riding on the roller coaster at the park. He was found unconscious but breathing when the train returned to its loading platform and collapsed when he got off. Paramedics performed CPR on him at the scene and he died after being taken to IU Health White Memorial Hospital. A coroner's report determined that the boy's death was caused by a pre-existing medical condition.

== Istiklol Park ==
- On June 29, 2019, the arm of a rotating pendulum ride snapped in mid-air during operation. A 19-year-old woman was killed upon impact with the ground while seven others suffered injuries.

== Jolly Roger Amusement Park ==
=== Wildcat ===
- On August 16, 2019, five passengers were injured when the train they were riding in apparently failed to stop and collided with another one parked at its station. They were taken to Atlantic General Hospital.

== Kalahari Resorts ==
=== Sandusky Location ===
- On August 2, 2009, a 3-year-old boy from Dearborn, Michigan, drowned in the outdoor kiddie pool in the resort. His body was found floating in the pool after he was separated from his mother. Lifeguards performed CPR on him, but he died afterwards.
- On April 11, 2017, a 25-year-old man from Chesapeake, Virginia, who was on a vacation with his family fell from a three-story balcony of the resort and was killed. It was reported that he had suffered a traumatic brain injury after being hit by a truck in 2006. The man died after being taken to a nearby hospital.
- On March 12, 2018, a piece of ductwork fell from the ceiling into the pool from the resort with five people, including a lifeguard, suffering minor injuries. The waterpark was closed for inspection about what might have caused the ductwork to break and later reopened.

== Kankaria Theme Park ==
=== Discovery ===
- On July 14, 2019, a cable on the ride's pendulum suddenly snapped, causing the attraction's seated end to slam into the ride's base and fall 20 feet (6.1 m) to the ground. Two people were killed while 29 others were injured and hospitalized.

== Kataplum Amusement Park ==
=== Juarez ===
- On June 18, 2019, an online viral video showed a woman falling from her seat on a ride and then being struck by a gondola. It was never made public what, if any, injuries she suffered. The video depicts the woman standing and walking away from the ride without assistance. Shortly thereafter, Armando Cabada, the mayor of the park, posted photos of the ride on Facebook and said that all rides at the park were operating properly while the one the woman was on was closed for investigation.

== Keansburg Amusement Park ==
=== Screamin' Demon ===
- On August 2, 1996, seven people suffered minor injuries when one train rear-ended another.

== Kemah Boardwalk ==
=== Aviator ===
- On August 10, 2012, a father and his 7-year-old son along with many other ride passengers were stranded 30 to 40 feet (9 to 12 m) high in the air when a ride operator accidentally pulled the emergency brake, leaving them up there for about 10 minutes until being brought down again. Some pieces also fell from the ride, mostly from the center column. The experience was recorded on the father's cell phone camera. Everyone was brought down safely and no one was injured.

=== Boardwalk Bullet ===
- On December 12, 2010, passengers were forced to get off the ride due to a malfunction which led the train to suddenly stop on the tracks. Five children were injured in the accident with some receiving back and neck injuries while a young girl ended up with a bruise on her face.
- On October 28, 2018, a mother from Spring, Texas, filed a lawsuit against the park claiming that her 6-year-old daughter almost fell out of the roller coaster they were riding on. She wanted more safety features to be added to all of the cars. The girl was tall enough to ride the roller coaster as the ride's height requirement is 48 inches (121.9 cm).

== Kishkinta ==
=== Disco Dancer ===
- On May 12, 2016, the ride collapsed, killing a 25-year-old employee and injuring nine other park staff. The accident occurred during a test run before re-opening for the first time since heavy rain flooded the Chennai area five months earlier.

== Knoebels Amusement Park ==
- On August 15, 2016, an 11-year-old girl from Hellertown, Pennsylvania, was injured and remained in critical condition when a 40-foot (12 m) tree toppled on her family's campsite. At around 4:30 pm, as a severe storm occurred, the tree fell due to a strong gust of wind. The girl, her father, and her two siblings were all taken to a nearby hospital for treatment.

=== Crystal Swimming Pool ===
- On July 6, 2011, a young boy was found face down in the pool. By the time the ambulance arrived, lifeguards performed CPR, obtained a heartbeat and the boy was breathing on his own. He died later at Geisinger Medical Center from trouble breathing. It was later determined that the child suffered from a pre-existing heart condition that is associated with Noonan syndrome.
- On July 16, 2016, another young boy died after he was found unresponsive in the swimming pool. He was rushed to a nearby hospital where he was pronounced dead. The incident may have been caused by a pre-existing medical condition.

=== Guest altercations ===
- On July 15, 2023, a woman was stabbed at the campground during an altercation with another guest. According to sources, the fight started when one woman became upset when another was flirting with a park guest. After a cooler of ice water was dumped on her daughter's head, 32-year-old Jessica Bertholf grabbed a knife and tried to slash the victim's truck tires. The victim tried to defend herself against Bertholf, who slashed the victim across the neck with the knife. The victim survived her injuries and Bertholf was taken to jail facing charges of aggravated assault.

=== Impulse ===
- On March 26, 2015, a worker was injured and suffered cuts on the back of his head and hand as he was hit by a roller coaster car. The ride was being tested before it officially opened to the public a month later. He was taken to a nearby hospital and recovered.

=== Scenic Skyway ===
- On June 13, 2003, a man was seriously injured in a 30-foot (9.1 m) fall from the Scenic Skyway chairlift ride. The man was a member of a group home for mentally disabled people and was riding alone. He was airlifted to a local hospital and recovered. The ride had opened two weeks before the accident. Inspectors found no problems with the ride.

=== Speed Slide ===
- On March 2, 1999, an attorney representing two girls who sustained injuries while riding the park's Speed Slide discovered a history of complaints of injuries made by riders on the same ride. The tort lawsuit filed sought $9,200 in medical costs and at least $50,000 in damages on behalf of one girl, age 11. The suit also sought $5,300 in medical costs and at least $100,000 in damages on behalf of the other girl, age 12. The park was charged with negligence, failure to monitor the amount of force of the water and its effect on riders, failure to fix defects, and failure to provide adequate warnings to riders.

== Krug Park ==
=== Big Dipper ===
- On July 24, 1930, sometime after 6:00 p.m., the park's Big Dipper roller coaster crashed when a bolt worked itself loose. Four cars containing children and teenagers plunged to the ground. Four people were killed and 17 injured.

== La Feria de Chapultepec Mágico ==
=== Quimera ===
- On September 28, 2019, the last train derailed after breaking loose from its track and plunging 30 feet (9.1 m) to the ground with 10 passengers aboard. Two men hit their heads on a steel support and fell from the ride, dying from severe head injuries. Two women were taken to a nearby hospital in serious condition and six people were treated at the scene. The park closed after the incident pending an investigation. After the investigation, city officials stated that none of the rides at the park had been properly maintained when the accident occurred, and the park's operating permit was subsequently revoked. The park never reopened.

== Lagoon Amusement Park ==
=== 1953 fire ===
- In November 1953, a fire destroyed much of the park, including (but not limited to) the Fun House, Dance Pavilion, Shooting Gallery, the Prize Center, and the Ghost Train dark ride. The park's losses were estimated to be at $500,000, and were not fully paid out by insurance. The precise cause of the fire was never determined, but it was speculated to have started in either the Roller Coaster's chain house or in the backroom of the Ghost Train.

=== Colossus the Fire Dragon ===
- On June 10, 1983, a 16-year-old employee was helping to run electrical wire underneath the track when she was struck by an oncoming train, losing her left arm at the shoulder.

=== Puff The Little Fire Dragon ===
- On April 30, 1989, a 6-year-old boy attempted to exit the vehicle near the end of the ride. He was run over and killed by an oncoming train.

=== Roller Coaster ===
- On August 20, 1934, a 20-year-old man from Ogden, Utah, fell to his death as he attempted to stand up when the train was on its highest hill. He hit a number of support trestles on the way down.
- In 1946, a man was struck by the train as he was working on scaffolding on the ride. He suffered skull, leg, and arm fractures, as well as internal injuries, and died at a Salt Lake hospital on September 1, 1946.
- On June 12, 1989, a 13-year-old girl stood up on the ride and fell 35 feet (11 m) to her death. She was pronounced dead at the scene.

=== Sky Ride ===
- On August 14, 2021, a 32-year-old riding the transport ride climbed over his vehicle's railing. He subsequently fell approximately 50 feet (15 m), and later died from his injuries on August 16, 2021, at University of Utah Hospital in Salt Lake City, Utah.

=== Wicked ===
- On September 4, 2021, a lawsuit was filed regarding an incident in October 2020 in which a paraplegic man's foot became shredded while on the ride. He was safe inside the coaster's train, but his paralyzed leg was not secured properly and eventually got caught on the wooden supports.

== Lake Winnepesaukah ==
=== Boat Chute ===
- On May 27, 2018, a woman broke her foot on the water ride. The park was fined $500 for failing to report the incident in a timely manner.

=== Bumper Cars ===
- On June 17, 2018, a 16-year-old suffered a minor injury while riding. The park reported this incident properly, but the news report for this item pointed out that the park was cited three times in three years for failing to report incidents.

=== Fly-O-Plane ===
- On July 16, 2016, two 9-year-old boys suffered injuries after being ejected from their seats while the ride was in motion. After the incident occurred, the ride remained closed following a safety inspection and reopened to the public about a month later.

=== Guest altercations ===
- On April 19, 2003, a crowd disturbance described as a "near-riot" involving 500 to 700 youths took place outside the park in Rossville, Georgia after management decided to close the park 90 minutes early. Catoosa County Sheriff Phil Summers claimed the incident was caused by parents leaving their children unattended at the park with little or no money, thus unable to participate in the park's activities. When sporadic fighting began in the crowd, the decision was made to close the park early, which escalated the fighting. Law enforcement agencies from Georgia and Tennessee were dispatched to the scene when the crowd began to disrupt traffic on roads surrounding the park. After the incident, the park instituted a new policy of requiring visitors under 21 years of age to be accompanied by a parent or guardian. Visitors are also required to purchase some sort of admission.

=== Wild Lightnin' ===
- On May 27, 2018, a 62-year-old woman injured her arm and head while riding. The park was fined $1,000 for not reporting this incident in a timely manner.
- On June 10, 2018, a woman fell out of the ride vehicle when her legs slipped out from the lap bar. The guest required surgery for a broken shoulder and upper arm. Inspectors found no fault with the ride. The park received a warning for the 15-hour delay in reporting this incident.

== Lakemont Park ==
=== Little Leaper Coaster ===
- On September 2, 1991, a 17-year-old ride operator named Chris Whitfield was dragged by the roller coaster and lost his right leg after it got mangled between the train and its track/chain. The accident was featured on the television series Rescue 911 on September 29, 1992, on CBS.

== Land of Illusion Adventure Park ==
=== Haunted Scream Park ===
- On October 21, 2011, a 16-year-old girl visited the park with her mother to watch her father perform in a band. Because of a pre-existing medical condition she suffered a heart attack and collapsed inside the haunted house attraction. Her mother and the paramedics both tried to revive her by performing CPR, but she later died at Atrium Medical Center.

== Longshan Amusement Park ==
=== Scream ===
- On May 1, 2015, two guests were killed and three were injured when they were thrown off the attraction. This was the opening day of the amusement park, and witnesses stated that they believed the ride was started by ride operators before the guests were secured.

== Melbourne Royal Show ==
=== Rebel Coaster ===
- On September 25, 2022, a woman in her 20s was reportedly in critical condition at Royal Melbourne Hospital after suffering severe head injuries as she was struck by a coaster train while trying to retrieve her phone. A Victoria police spokesperson claimed that officers were trying to determine the exact cause of the incident; however, the ride will be temporarily closed while an investigation was conducted.

== Memphis Incredible Pizza Company ==
=== Incredible Spin Coaster ===
- On November 11, 2016, a 17-year-old girl from Lafayette, Tennessee, on a church youth group class trip with other students, lost consciousness shortly after riding the spinning roller coaster at the indoor amusement center. She began to feel ill before but still got on the ride with her friends. When it was over, she collapsed after exiting. She later died after being taken to St. Francis Bartlett Hospital.

== Mt. Olympus Water & Theme Park ==
=== Medusa's Indoor Water Park ===
- On January 23, 2015, a 4-year-old boy nearly drowned in the indoor water park. EMS responded and he was airlifted to a nearby hospital and later recovered.

=== Neptune's Water Kingdom ===
- On December 21, 2016, a 16-year-old boy from Port St. Lucie, Florida, died after falling 35 feet (10.7 m) from the Dragon's Tail waterslide. The park was already closed for the season at the time and his death was ruled accidental according to the police.

=== Opa ===
- On March 6, 2014, a 63-year-old man from Fremont, Wisconsin, fell 17 feet (5 m) from the Opa wild mouse roller coaster after a lap bar malfunctioned. He was taken to a nearby hospital where he was treated for numerous fractures, a severe brain injury and was in a coma for three weeks. The ride was closed permanently and later removed.

=== Resort Hotels ===
- On August 7, 2018, a 3-year-old girl from Bensenville, Illinois, was fatally injured when she was struck by a moving car in the parking lot at the Hotel Rome resort of the park. She was airlifted to nearby UW Hospital but later died from her injuries.

=== Zeus' Playground ===
- On July 8, 2015, a cable snapped on the Catapult ride before two riders were launched in the air. They were not injured. The video was uploaded on Facebook and other media platforms before being removed. The ride was closed for inspection following the incident but was removed from the park two days later.

== Morey's Piers ==
=== The Great Nor'easter ===
- On August 23, 1995, a 36-year-old male worker was killed after he was struck in the head by a passenger's foot while picking up trash in a fenced area beneath the ride. The park later put a new restricted section from the ride shortly after the incident.

=== Giant Wheel ===
- On June 3, 2011, an 11-year-old girl on a school field trip from Pleasantville, New Jersey, was riding on the Giant Wheel alone when she fell from the ride. She was taken to Cape Regional Medical Center in nearby Cape May Court House but was later pronounced dead after arrival. The police reported it may have been a freak accident. The ride was shut down briefly following the incident and her parents sued the ride's manufacturer shortly after her death. As a result of the incident, Morey's Piers adjusted their height requirements for the Giant Wheel from 4 feet 6 inches (137 cm) to 5 feet (152 cm).
- On February 18, 2026, Wildwood police arrested a 67-year-old man who allegedly stole $175,000 worth of metal from a refurbishment work area of the ride. During the theft the man broke into the site over several days, removed the metal and sold it to a scrap yard. Park officials said the incident set back the refurbishment, but that the ride would reopen later in the 2026 season. Later articles stated that the man who allegedly committed the theft had expressed safety concerns and resentment toward the park's owners in Facebook posts.

=== Jet Star ===
- On July 20, 1997, a 9-year-old boy was injured after falling 20 feet (6.1 m) when the ride's emergency brake system was activated. The victim was taken to Cooper Hospital – University Medical Center in Camden, New Jersey, and was reported to be in a stable condition.

=== Sea Dragon ===
- On August 19, 2011, five people were injured when the ride's center mast suddenly broke apart while in motion. A park guest was taken to the hospital with non-life-threatening injuries, while four others suffered minor injuries treated at the scene.

=== Sea Serpent ===
- On June 28, 1998, 13 of the 23 riders on board the ride were injured while riding the roller coaster. The chief executive officer of the park reported that a wheel coming off a rear axle from the coaster train may have been the cause of the incident.

=== SpringShot ===
- In July 2021, a 13-year-old girl from Weatherly, Pennsylvania, was struck in the face by a seagull during the ride, but was not injured.

=== Zoom Phloom ===
- On July 2, 2010, a child suffered serious injuries and was taken to the hospital after he struck his head in the log he was riding in. He was the only person riding and no one else was with him. After that, the park management made a new rule requiring guests to be with their child while riding the attraction.

== Myrtle Beach Pavilion ==
=== Ferris Wheel ===
- On July 20, 1991, one of the carriages from the Ferris wheel tipped over after some people rocked in it, plummeting them almost 41 feet (12 m) to the ground. A 17-year-old boy from Wilmington, North Carolina, died of head injuries after being taken to Grand Strand General Hospital and two girls were also injured.

=== Hydro Surge ===
- In 1994, a 3-year-old girl nearly drowned and eight other passengers on board suffered injuries when a raft overturned. According to media reports, the incident occurred once the raft was lined up at the conveyor belt.

== Nagashima Spa Land ==
=== Steel Dragon 2000 ===
- On August 23, 2003, a wheel from the train came loose and fell off during the ride, injuring two people. The ride remained closed for almost three years before reopening again.

== New York-New York Hotel and Casino ==
=== Big Apple Coaster ===
- On December 23, 2020, the middle car of one of the new trains derailed on the lift hill during a test run, causing severe damage to part of the catwalk.

== Niagara Amusement Park ==
=== Ferris Wheel ===
- On August 11, 1991, a 14-year-old boy from Deerfield, Kansas, slid under the ride's safety bar, fell 60 feet (18 m) and suffered severe injuries to his head after his seat slipped off its axle. He was taken to Kenmore Mercy Hospital where he later died.

== Nickelodeon Universe (Mall of America) ==
=== Backyardigans Swing-Along ===
- On May 14, 2008, four people were slightly hurt, suffering minor leg injuries when the Backyardigans Swing Along malfunctioned, apparently spinning faster than normal. The ride was shut down when it became apparent that it was malfunctioning and remained closed until maintenance crews found and fixed the problem.

=== Log Chute ===
- On Saturday, August 1, 1998, 12-year-old David Craig of Cable, Wisconsin fell off the log chute. When the boat neared the top of the chute, the boy panicked and reached outside the log to grab a railing. The ride operator attempted to stop the ride, but the log had already begun its descent down the major drop. Losing his grip, he fell off the chute onto landscaping rocks. The boy died from his injuries. Ride manufacturer O.D. Hopkins Associates, Inc., inspected it and found it was in proper working order. It was the first fatal accident to occur at any Camp Snoopy location, which at the time was the park's theme.
- On November 4, 2007, a conveyor belt on the log chute malfunctioned, causing one log to crash into the other. However, there were only minor injuries. The ride was inspected and repaired and then reopened on November 15, 2007.

=== Screaming Yellow Eagle ===
- On Saturday, August 15, 1998, a girl died of a heart attack, aged 8 years, 11 months, after she rode the Screaming Yellow Eagle (later known as Danny Phantom Ghost Zone), a rotating platform ride from Chance Rides. Her parents reported that she had a history of heart problems for five years before her death. The ride was operating properly.

=== SpongeBob SquarePants: Rock Bottom Plunge ===
- Between 2011 and 2012, eight people complained of injuries from the ride. Six people complained of neck injuries and two complained of back injuries.

=== Tak Attack ===
- In April 1998, a 0.75 inches (19 mm) plastic nut came loose on Tak Attack (called The Mighty Axe at the time), causing the ride to come to a stop with riders stuck upside down at the very top. The loose nut had interrupted the power to the seating platform. The five riders were stuck for about an hour before park mechanics were able to get them down.

== Oaks Amusement Park ==
=== AtmosFEAR ===
- On June 14, 2024, 28 guests were stuck upside-down for more than 30 minutes. The cause of the malfunction is unknown, and maintenance workers were able to reset the ride so guests could exit. One person with a pre-existing medical condition was taken to the hospital, but no other injuries were reported.

== Ocean Breeze Waterpark ==
=== Trident ===
- On February 19, 2019, a woman from James City County, Virginia, filed a $1 million lawsuit against the park after reporting that she suffered serious injuries in 2016 when the inner tube she was using "collapsed on itself," causing her head to hit a wall. She was knocked unconscious and suffered a concussion and subsequent seizures.

== Ocean Park Hong Kong ==
=== Buried Alive ===
- On September 16, 2017, a 21-year-old man was hit in the head by a coffin bottom after he accidentally entered an employees-only area of the haunted house attraction. He was taken to Ruttonjee Hospital and died from his injuries. It was later questioned why the restricted area was not securely locked or marked with a warning. The attraction remained closed following an investigation.

=== Mine Train ===
- On November 20, 2014, a 63-year-old man from the Philippines died after riding the Mine Train roller coaster while at the park with his family. An autopsy revealed that he died from a heart attack and had a 20-year history of health problems.

=== Ocean Express ===
- On December 5, 2010, seven passengers on the ride were injured when its driver accidentally activated the emergency brake while they were proceeding to the summit. A 70-year-old male passenger was taken to Queen Mary Hospital in Pok Fu Lam in critical condition with facial injuries, and his wife injured her face and knees. The other passengers were taken to Ruttonjee Hospital in Wan Chai with minor injuries. The train later reopened with a switch protector installed over the emergency brake button.

=== The Summit ===
- On April 9, 2014, a 50-year-old Chinese man who was a tourist from Hubei, China lost his balance while sitting on a railing and fell 11 metres (36 ft). He was found unconscious when paramedics arrived and died after he was taken to Ruttonjee Hospital in Wan Chai. The police ruled it an accident.

=== Wild Twister ===
- On August 10, 2025, 17 passengers on board the ride were left stranded mid-air for over an hour due to a signal failure. All riders were rescued safely.
- On March 30, 2021, 14 passengers on board the ride were left stranded mid-air for at least six minutes after it malfunctioned. All riders safely evacuated.

=== Ocean Park Tower ===
- On May 24, 2025, the observation tower was suspended after its safety protection system activated due to a signal failure. Ride operators assisted all 17 passengers in exiting after an hour.

== Ohio State Fair ==
=== Fire Ball ===
- On July 26, 2017, during the fair's opening day that year, the ride malfunctioned and broke apart mid-swing, causing passengers to be flung off the ride. An 18-year-old man was killed after falling 50 feet (15 m) while seven others were injured. Two people were also reportedly in critical condition. The ride was inspected before it opened for operation. KMG, the ride's manufacturer, along with Chance Morgan, shut it down while an investigation was pending. All other amusement rides at the fair were closed the next day according to the Ohio Department of Agriculture and Ohio State Highway Patrol. The other rides at different amusement parks that were made by the same manufacturer also ceased operations in response to the incident.

== Old Indiana Fun Park ==
- On August 11, 1996, a 4-year-old girl was paralyzed from the chest down and her 57-year-old grandmother killed after the miniature train ride at the Old Indiana Fun Park derailed and overturned as it approached a curve. The two victims were crushed under the weight of the cars. An investigation showed that the train was traveling much faster than its design speed of 12 miles per hour (19 km/h).

== Old Town ==
=== Slingshot ===
- On March 26, 2021, a cable on the ride snapped leaving two passengers stranded in mid-air. Crews from the Kissimmee and Osceola County fire rescues were able to evacuate the riders a few hours later. No injuries were reported.

== Overseas Chinese Town East ==
=== Space Journey ===
- On June 29, 2010, six people were killed and nine were injured when a Space Shuttle-simulator ride called Space Journey fell to the ground in Shenzhen, China. According to eyewitnesses, all 11 cabins turned upside down, ejecting passengers. Another eyewitness claimed that a power shortage caused the accident.

== Playland (New York) ==
=== Birch Bay Waterslides ===
- On August 25, 2022, a 42-year-old man from Bellingham, Washington, was severely injured after two slide segments came apart on a waterslide.

=== Dragon Coaster ===
- On September 2, 1988, an 8-year-old girl choked to death while chewing gum on the ride.

=== Other Incidents ===
- On July 4, 2006, a 43-year-old man from Queens, New York, drowned after walking into a 40 feet (12 m) deep man-made lake. An autopsy showed the victim had a blood-alcohol level well over the legal limit.

=== Mind Scrambler ===
- On May 22, 2004, a 7-year-old girl from New Rochelle, New York, was killed when she fell out of the ride after maneuvering out of her restraints.
- On June 29, 2007, a 21-year-old female park employee from White Plains, New York, was killed when the ride was started by a second employee while the victim was still assisting guests with their safety restraints. Park officials stated that a safety precaution implemented after the 2004 Mind Scrambler incident was not followed. A report by the State's Labor Department on August 24, 2007, stated that the ride operators were running the ride improperly. The ride owner was cited for providing inadequate training. Due to this incident, the Mind Scrambler was closed permanently and later dismantled.

=== SuperFlight ===
- On August 18, 2007, three people were stranded on the ride for nearly an hour. Park maintenance inspected and found it happened due to a sensor detecting the ride's cars were too close to one another which caused it to be stopped automatically. The incident came after a park employee died after being struck by a ride vehicle on the Mind Scrambler two months prior.

=== The Whip ===
- On August 18, 1938, a 19-year-old was killed when he was thrown from the ride.

=== Wild Mouse ===
- On July 8, 1984, six people were taken to the hospital after suffering injuries when the train they were riding in collided with another. The ride was shut down for investigation and later reopened. Park officials stated that a mechanical failure was the cause of the accident.

=== Ye Old Mill ===
- On August 3, 2005, a 7-year-old boy from Norwalk, Connecticut, died of blunt force trauma to the head after he climbed out of a boat on the Ye Old Mill ride, where he became trapped underwater by a conveyor belt. The victim's family sued the county that owned Playland, and on March 24, 2009, the defendants were ordered to pay US$1.25 million and create a scholarship in the victim's name. The scholarship is awarded annually to the Playland employee who exhibits excellence in safety and customer service.

== Playland (Vancouver) ==
=== The Beast ===
- On August 12, 2019, park officials temporarily shut down the ride after a malfunction occurred, leaving passengers covered in oil as they were riding and some that were waiting in line. It reopened two weeks later.

=== Wooden Roller Coaster ===
- On August 18, 1992, a 13-year-old girl "wriggled out" of her seat's safety bar and fell from a lower section of the coaster's track. She survived the fall, but was taken to Burnaby Hospital to be treated for a sore ankle and a cut on her arm, which were sustained in the incident. It was the first incident on this ride in its then 34 years of operation.

== Playland's Castaway Cove ==
=== GaleForce ===
- On April 13, 2019, two test dummies riding the roller coaster were thrown from one of its trains and crashed into a roof of a nearby hotel. It was reported that the water-filled dummies had leaked and shrunk, allowing them to be ejected; there were no reported injuries. When the train returned to its station, the park management checked all safety features to ensure everything was secure and in place.

== Quassy Amusement Park ==
=== Other Incidents ===
- On July 14, 2004, a 19-year-old man from Brooklyn, New York, drowned while he was swimming with other campers at the lake. Lifeguards performed CPR on him and he was taken to a nearby hospital where he was pronounced dead on arrival.

=== Twister ===
- On August 11, 1994, a 6-year-old boy from Ansonia, Connecticut, was killed when he was trapped underneath the cart after trying to get off the ride. It was suspected that a teenager played a prank on the operator of the ride and hit a button on the ride's control panel to start the ride back up after it was stopped to let passengers off.

== Queens Land ==
=== Free Fall ===
- On June 24, 2019, 12 people were injured when a cable snapped as the ride was coming to a stop. Local authorities shut down the theme park until the park could show legal documents proving each ride was in a safe working order.

== Raging Waters ==
=== Wave Pool ===
- On June 1, 2018, a 12-year-old girl nearly drowned while playing in the wave pool at the park. She was pulled from the water at around 11:00 am and a lifeguard performed CPR on her until she was airlifted to a nearby hospital.

== Rainbow's End ==
- On February 10, 1990, a 19-year-old man died from injuries received after falling off the bungee cord when the ride operator accidentally forgot to secure him in. The person who maintained the attraction was later found guilty of manslaughter and then sentenced to 200 hours of community service.

=== Corkscrew ===
- On November 17, 2018, 15 passengers were evacuated from the Corkscrew roller coaster after the ride stopped on top of its lift hill due to a safety malfunction. No injuries were reported but four people angrily demanded refunds when they got off.

=== Enchanted Forest Log Flume ===
- On November 10, 2012, a woman's leg got stuck on the log flume ride as she was trapped between a log and a wooden fence. Firefighters removed part of the fence to free her trapped leg. The woman was taken to a nearby hospital with minor injuries.

=== Ferris Wheel ===
- On February 2, 2008, a 21-year-old employee was killed while performing maintenance on the Ferris Wheel. He got trapped on a carriage and was freed by firefighters, but was later pronounced dead at the scene.

== Rockin' Raceway ==
=== The Hawk ===
- On March 14, 2004, a 50-year-old woman fell 60 feet (18 m) to her death from a pendulum-like ride, "The Hawk." Charles Stanley Martin, the park manager, was charged with second-degree murder and was subsequently convicted of reckless homicide.

== Royal Adelaide Show ==
=== Airmaxx 360 ===
- On September 12, 2014, an 8-year-old girl from Malaysia died after being thrown from her seat on the ride. The owners maintaining the ride were fined over $157,000 following the incident.

== Sahara Las Vegas ==
=== Speed – The Ride ===
- On April 5, 2007, a circuit was blown up, causing a train with sixteen passengers to valley before the vertical loop.

== Santa Cruz Beach Boardwalk ==
=== Cyclone ===
- On August 4, 2008, a woman bruised her leg and a 9-year-old boy suffered minor injuries when a door fell off the ride during operation. A passenger was treated at the scene by paramedics.

=== Giant Dipper ===
- In 1924, 15-year-old Walter Fernald Byrne fell from the train while standing up during the ride. He was crushed by the train after falling headfirst onto the track. This event led to the addition of safety belts to the coaster. Additional fatalities occurred in 1940 and 1970, the former prompting the replacement of the old, open-style cars.

== Santa's Village AZoosment Park ==
=== Candy Cane Sleigh Ride ===
- On June 10, 1993, a sleigh of passengers overturned while taking a curve, spilling some out. A 67-year-old woman suffered a traumatic head injury and later died after being taken to Sherman Hospital. Others aboard suffered minor injuries and were treated by paramedics.

== Santa's Village (New Hampshire) ==
=== Poogee Penguins Spin Out Coaster ===
- On August 27, 2022, a 51-year-old employee fell 8 feet (2.4 m) from a ride platform after being struck by a ride vehicle and suffered serious injuries.

== Scandia Family Fun Center ==
=== Sky Screamer ===
- On August 30, 2011, two workers were 50 feet (15 m) above ground removing a part from the ride. Their crane collapsed and fell into one of the park's miniature golf course's holes and part of the batting cages. One worker was injured when his arm became stuck between two pieces of metal, while the other suffered minor injuries and bruises. They were rescued by firefighters.
- On May 5, 2018, a 20-year-old man and 14-year-old boy were stranded for 45 minutes when the attraction lost power and became stuck with the riders 150 feet (46 m) in the air. Firefighters rescued the guests. The riders were not hospitalized.

== Seabreeze Amusement Park ==
=== The Enchanter ===
- On May 22, 1981, 14-year-old Lynette Papietro was killed after leaving the moving ride car as it passed through a large rotating barrel and becoming wedged between the moving barrel and a wooden structure, suffocating her.

=== Jack Rabbit ===
- On an unspecified date in 1930, 19-year-old Merritt J. Kramer was killed after falling from the initial drop of the Jack Rabbit. In 1931, a suit related to the death was settled in court with a total settlement of $1,250.

=== Quantum Loop ===
- On June 21, 1997, nine people suffered minor injuries when the ride stopped suddenly after descending down its incline.

== Siam Park (Thailand) ==
=== Flume ride ===
- On October 23, 2007, a woman was killed and five people injured when the ride vehicle fell 20 metres (66 ft) to the ground from the top of the lift hill. Park management said that there was a drop in electric power, causing a water pump to fail to provide sufficient water levels on the ride.

=== Super Spiral ===
- On January 12, 2008, 28 children, ages 10 to 13, were injured when they spiraled down two meters (6.6 f) to the ground after the final sections of the Super Spiral water slide collapsed.

== Star City ==
=== 2019 Fire ===
- On October 2, 2019, a major fire occurred around midnight which destroyed 80% of the park. There were no injuries or deaths reported. Some of the rides and attractions are still standing, but not operating.

=== Giant Star Wheel ===
- On July 10, 2018, a man died from his injuries after falling from the top of the Ferris wheel.

=== Jungle Splash ===
- On September 9, 2006, a 13-year-old female patron died after falling off the ride. On September 19, the engineer's office temporarily suspended operations of the amusement park coinciding with the same day that the management had reached a settlement with the family of the deceased patron and another non-fatal incident at the park's bumper car ride.

=== Star Flyer ===
- On February 6, 2009, a 39-year-old man died after falling 15 metres (49 ft) off the ride. Witnesses say that his body hit a metal structure before plummeting to the ground.
- On February 7, 2018, 10 passengers were stranded on the ride when it suffered an electrical malfunction.

== Storybook Land ==
=== Big Truck Ride ===
- On May 8, 2011, the ride derailed at the first turn, causing cars to exit the track and fall 2.5 feet (0.76 m) to the ground, injuring two adults and a one-year-old boy. The cause was determined to be an internal component. Management decided to remove the ride, explaining, "We simply can't be sure about the precise cause of the failure and will not risk the safety of our patrons when we cannot be 100% certain that the ride can be made completely safe." It was replaced with an attraction called Workzone, which opened in the summer of 2014.

=== Out on a Limb ===
- On October 18, 2019, a girl was injured after she fell from the ride. Park officials temporarily shut down the ride pending an investigation. It was the second incident that occurred at a New Jersey theme park in October 2019 after a 10-year-old girl died after falling from a Super-Sizzler style carnival ride a few days prior at a county fair in Deerfield Township on October 12, which had resulted in New Jersey suspending all Sizzler rides in the state while they investigated.

== Stratosphere Tower ==
=== High Roller ===
- On December 26, 1996, a roller coaster car partially derailed, causing it to abruptly stop on the tracks after two wheels fell off during the ride. Passengers were safely evacuated off the train and no injuries were reported. The ride was repaired and put back into service a few hours later.

=== Insanity ===
On April 20, 2005, an 18-year-old woman and her 11-year-old cousin were stranded 906 feet (276 m) in the air for nearly an hour and a half when the ride triggered an emergency stop due to strong winds. They were rescued by employees.

== Splash Adventure ==
- In 1999, five people were injured when a raft overturned.
- In 2001, a boat filled with park employees overturned when the employees rocked the boat. No one was injured.
- On August 4, 2009, a family of three and one other park visitor were injured when a boat capsized. Witnesses said that the family's boat hit an empty boat and overturned. The family was underwater for approximately 20 seconds.
- On June 6, 2011, a fight broke out between several youths and spread throughout the park. One guest described it as a borderline riot. The Bessemer Police were called to the park and no more guests were allowed into the park. The incident was blamed on a "$10 before 10 a.m." promotional event that was mishandled by park staff.

=== Warrior River ===
- On June 3, 2018, a 10-year-old boy was injured when he hit his head while floating around Warrior River.

== Texas State Fair ==
=== Enterprise ===
- On October 17, 1983, one rider was killed and three others were seriously injured when a gondola fell off the ride.

== Trimper's Rides ==
=== Hampton I ===
- On June 28, 2012, a two-year-old boy from Accomack County, Virginia, was critically injured and suffered a traumatic brain injury after a car struck him while he tried to exit the ride. He thought the ride was over until realizing that it was stopped to let another child off. When he tried to get back on, he was struck by the vehicle, fracturing his skull. On July 29, 2014, his mother filed a $1 million lawsuit against the park. She claimed that the operator was careless in not checking to see if the tracks were clear or whether the children were secured.

=== Tidal Wave ===
- On July 23, 2010, three riders were injured when a cable snapped, resulting in a mechanical failure. They were taken to the hospital. The park claimed that a passenger was hit by debris while waiting in line and two were shaking around when the ride stopped.

== Urban Air Trampoline and Adventure Park ==
=== Lakeland, Florida location ===
- On September 1, 2019, a 10-year-old boy fell from his harness on the Sky Rider Coaster zipline and fell over 20 feet (6.1 m) to concrete below, suffering broken bones, a collapsed lung, and a brain injury. He was airlifted to Tampa General Hospital. A report concluded that operators did not fully secure the boy's harness prior to dispatch. On November 6, 2019, a lawsuit was filed by the boy's mother.

== Waldameer & Water World ==
- On July 11, 1904, 18-year-old Frank Woodbridge drowned while swimming in the Waldameer beaches when the lifeguards were on a dinner break.
- During the late evening hours of August 7, 1938, the Ravine Flyer coaster did not clear the hill following the dip crossing Peninsula Drive. As the train traveled back and forth over Peninsula Drive, passenger Mary Sersch became hysterical. Her brother, 19-year-old Clarence Sersch rose out of his seat to try to calm her. He lost his balance and fell to his death in Peninsula Drive. The ride was shut down for investigation. One investigation determined that the ride was condemned after it was discovered that a locked wheel assembly had caused the train to lose speed over Peninsula Drive, but other reports stated that the ride was cleared of any wrongdoing. Regardless, it was dismantled at the request of then-park owner Alex Moeller's wife, who was distraught over the incident. Ravine Flyer was replaced 70 years later in 2008 by Ravine Flyer II, in which Peninsula Drive was spanned again. The ride's station still stands today, now a picnic grove known as Lakeview Grove.
- In the fall of 1941, the Hofbrau German Beer Garden caught fire while hosting a company dinner. 11 people were injured, and one 17-year-old waitress was killed when she returned to the burning building to retrieve her purse.
- On May 26, 2014, a man was stabbed before a fight broke out in the park, taken to a local hospital, and survived.
- On October 23, 2016, a fight broke out at an event in the Rainbow Gardens dance hall which resulted in shots being fired. Several people were injured, but no one was killed.
- On June 28, 2019, the Chaos ride was going through its usual cycle. At around 1:30 p.m., it became stuck upside-down for about two minutes. There were no injuries reported. The ride was closed for the rest of the day and reopened the following day with the upside-down feature temporarily removed. On July 3, the cause of the malfunction was stated to be due to loose wires. The ride was reopened to its full ride cycle again on July 4 without further issue.
- In the afternoon of April 19, 2020, five persons broke into Water World while it was closed and rode skateboards through the park and inside several water slides, causing thousands of dollars in damages to the slides in the form of chips and scratches. They were taken into custody at the park and charged with third-degree felony-level criminal mischief. All five later agreed to pay restitution of $10,000 each in return for their charges being lessened to second-degree misdemeanors.
- On May 31, 2021, a fight broke out at around 6:30 p.m. Seven people were later charged in connection to it.
- On July 11, 2022, a fight broke out just before 7:00 p.m. One person was hospitalized with a spinal cord injury.
- On the evening of August 17, 2024, the Flying Swings ride did not slow down as it was brought back to the ground, causing several riders to hit their legs on the fence surrounding the ride. The ride reopened several days later following an inspection and several test cycles without further issue.
- Four break-ins occurred on the evenings ofMarch March, March 7,Marchpril 1, and April 4, 2026. The suspects stole tools and a golf cart from the park, and damaged park property. The suspects were later arrested and charged, and the golf cart was returned to the park.

== Water Works Park ==
- On August 5, 2007, an unidentified 10-year-old girl suffered severe internal injuries while riding the speed slide at the Denton, Texas, park. The accident report filed by the on-duty lifeguards stated that the injuries were caused by the victim's failure to follow park rules, namely keeping her legs crossed at the ankles, while riding. The park rule regarding crossing ankles on a water slide is common in the industry, and is one method (along with wearing a wet suit) used to prevent "straddle injuries."

== Water World, Colorado ==
=== Captain Jack's Wave Pool ===
- On July 21, 2009, a 48-year-old man was found unresponsive in the wave pool as a lifeguard pulled him out of the water. Once paramedics arrived, they tried to revive him by performing CPR, but he later died as a result of drowning according to preliminary reports. It was the park's first fatality in 30 years of operation.

== The Wave ==
=== Emerald Plunge ===
- On May 27, 2017, a 10-year-old boy hydroplaned off the water slide during the park's grand opening weekend, suffering injuries to his back. The victim's family settled with the slide's manufacturer for US$2.5 million. According to the father, the slide had been tested for height but not for weight.

== Wonderla Park ==
=== Bangalore location ===
==== The Hurricane ====
- On June 18, 2019, a viral video posted on social media showed four people suffered minor injuries when their car suddenly malfunctioned as the ride began midway. The police said that they were unaware of the accident at the time when it occurred.

== Wonderland Park ==
=== Drop of Fear ===
- On May 9, 2015, a woman riding with four other people was injured when she was hit in the head by a large chunk of metal. She felt dizzy, went to a local hospital, and was released. It was reported that she suffered a concussion and also a bruised knee.

=== Mouse Trap ===
- On April 27, 2016, a 6-year-old boy's seat belt came undone during the ride. His father was recording a video when he noticed his son fall to the bottom of the car they were in. The father held him for the rest of the ride until the train returned to the station. No injuries were sustained, and the car was removed for inspection.
- On May 21, 2019, 12 guests needed rescue from the ride after the train became stuck at the top of the coaster.

=== Zyklon ===
- On April 19, 1987, a 15-year-old boy died after falling out of the ride when his restraining bar suddenly gave way.

== World Waterpark ==
=== Corkscrew ===
- On August 5, 2018, a 59-year-old woman from Saskatoon, Canada at the park for her granddaughter's fifth birthday was sliding down the Corkscrew water slide when her ring got stuck on a piece of foam. The slide was shut down for inspection while a lifeguard helped find the missing ring and her finger which was torn off. Her finger was amputated while the park investigated the incident.

=== Guest accidents ===
- On October 3, 2018, six people were injured while attending an electronic music festival, Soundwave, inside the waterpark. Four of the six people were taken to the hospital in life-threatening condition while the remaining two were in stable condition.
- On January 27, 2019, three people who were attending the same event also suffered injuries. Two were taken to the hospital in stable condition and one in serious condition. Details of both incidents were never released.

== Worlds of Wonder ==
- On June 27, 2017, according to a Facebook post, a park guest reported that a man was injured when he fell off the ride after his safety harness came undone. He hit his head on one of the supports and suffered minor injuries.

== Yuhuan Park ==
- On September 24, 2018, a 5-year-old boy's neck became trapped in the bars on one of the carriages in the Ferris Wheel and he almost slipped from his seat. He was eventually rescued and suffered minor injuries.

== Yulong Shuiyun Water Amusement Park ==
- On July 31, 2019, a malfunction occurred at the park's wave pool, sending out tsunami-sized waves and injuring 44 guests at the scene. Five were hospitalized with fractured ribs. The cause of the incident was blamed on a power cut that damaged the equipment used to make the water go in and out. The park temporarily closed down the attraction for repairs. The incident was later uploaded onto social media where it went viral.

== Zehnder's Splash Village ==
=== Super Loop Speed Slide ===
- On February 18, 2018, a 10-year-old girl from Grand Blanc, Michigan, died of cardiac arrest after she was found unconscious while riding a slide at the resort. According to the paramedics, while trying to revive her, they discovered that she had a rare medical disorder called long QT syndrome, her heart was beating fast and she had a pulse. Her parents said that she may have been too excited at first when they realized that she was finally tall enough to ride. They then sued the resort afterward for not providing any proper medical care sooner at the time of the incident.

== See also ==
- United States amusement park accidents
