= United States amusement park accidents =

United States amusement park accidents refer to serious injuries or deaths that occur at amusement parks in the United States. Many such accidents are reported to regulatory authorities as usually required by law everywhere in the US. The US Consumer Product Safety Commission tracks statistics for all amusement ride accidents. Regulations and records can vary depending on the country. Accidents listed here are caused by one of the following:

1. Negligence on the part of the guest. This can be refusal to follow specific ride safety instructions, or deliberate intent to violate park rules.
2. The result of a guest's known, or unknown, health issues.
3. Negligence on the part of the park, either by ride operator or maintenance safety instructions, or deliberate intent to violate park rules.

== Statistics for the United States ==
- From 1987 to 2000, there were an estimated 4.5 amusement ride-related deaths per year.
- From 1990 to 2004, there were 52 deaths associated with amusement park rides (3.7 per year).
- Every day from May through September in each year between 1990–2010 had an average of 20 injuries by amusement park guests under 18 years of age that required hospitalization.
- In 2011, 1,204 people were injured at 400 amusement parks, according to the IAAPA.
- In 2019, there were 1,299 injuries from amusement park accidents in the U.S.

== Notable incidents ==
- Incidents at Disney parks
- Incidents at Enchanted Parks properties
- Incidents at Herschend parks
- Incidents at LEGOLAND parks
- Incidents at Premier Parks properties
- Incidents at United Parks & Resorts
- Incidents at Six Flags parks
- Incidents at Universal parks
- Incidents at Warner Bros. parks
- Incidents at independent amusement parks
- Incidents at European amusement parks

== Bibliography ==
- ASTM F2291, Practice for Design of Amusement Rides and Devices
