= Incidents at Legoland parks =

This is a summary of notable incidents that have taken place at various Legoland theme parks, amusement parks, or water parks. This list is not intended to be a comprehensive list of every such event, but only those that have a significant impact on the parks or park operations, or are otherwise significantly newsworthy.

The term incidents refers to major accidents, injuries, or deaths that occur at a Legoland park. While these incidents were required to be reported to regulatory authorities due to where they occurred, they usually fall into one of the following categories:

- Caused by negligence on the part of the guest. This can be refusal to follow specific ride safety instructions, or deliberate intent to violate park rules.
- The result of a guest's known, or unknown, health issues.
- Negligence on the part of the park, either by ride operator or maintenance.
- Act of God or a generic accident (e.g. slipping and falling), that is not a direct result of an action on anybody's part.

== Legoland, Billund, Denmark ==
=== The Xtreme Racer ===
- On 29 April 2007, a 21-year-old park employee was killed by a ride vehicle as she climbed over a security fence to retrieve a guest's wallet.

== Legoland Deutschland Resort, Günzburg, Germany ==
=== Feuerdrache ===
- On 11 August 2022, 31 people were injured with one suffering serious injuries when two carriages collided. In 2023, it was found that the first carriage had become stationary on the track, and two technicians manually overrode a sensor warning that would have prevented the second train from advancing, causing the collision. Penalty orders and fees were issued against the two employees.

== Legoland Windsor Resort, Berkshire, England ==
=== Fires ===
- On 28 October 2006, a fire broke out in a storage barn onsite during the end of season fireworks. No one was injured.
- In October 2007, a fire broke out in a shed being used to store chemicals.

=== Ninjago: The Ride ===
- In 2019, a 5-year-old boy was involved in an accessibility dispute at Ninjago: the Ride. The boy, who uses a wheelchair and is unable to walk without help, was asked to "prove" he could walk by walking three paces repeatedly, causing humiliation and pain. At the time, certain rides within the park had a policy of requiring riders to be able to walk unaided. As a result of a settlement with the family, the policy was later removed from all but one of the park's rides.

=== Other incidents ===
- In September 2010, the park's large number of wasps during the season was discussed on Watchdog, with general manager Sue Kemp appearing with host Anne Robinson and confirming new signage, actions and details on the website.
- In February 2014, the park cancelled a private event organised by Islamic cleric Haitham al-Haddad due to safety reasons following a backlash and threats by nationalist groups.
- In August 2016, two 6-year-old girls were sexually assaulted while at the resort, leading to a police investigation over the incident.
