= Disk'O =

Type of flat ride

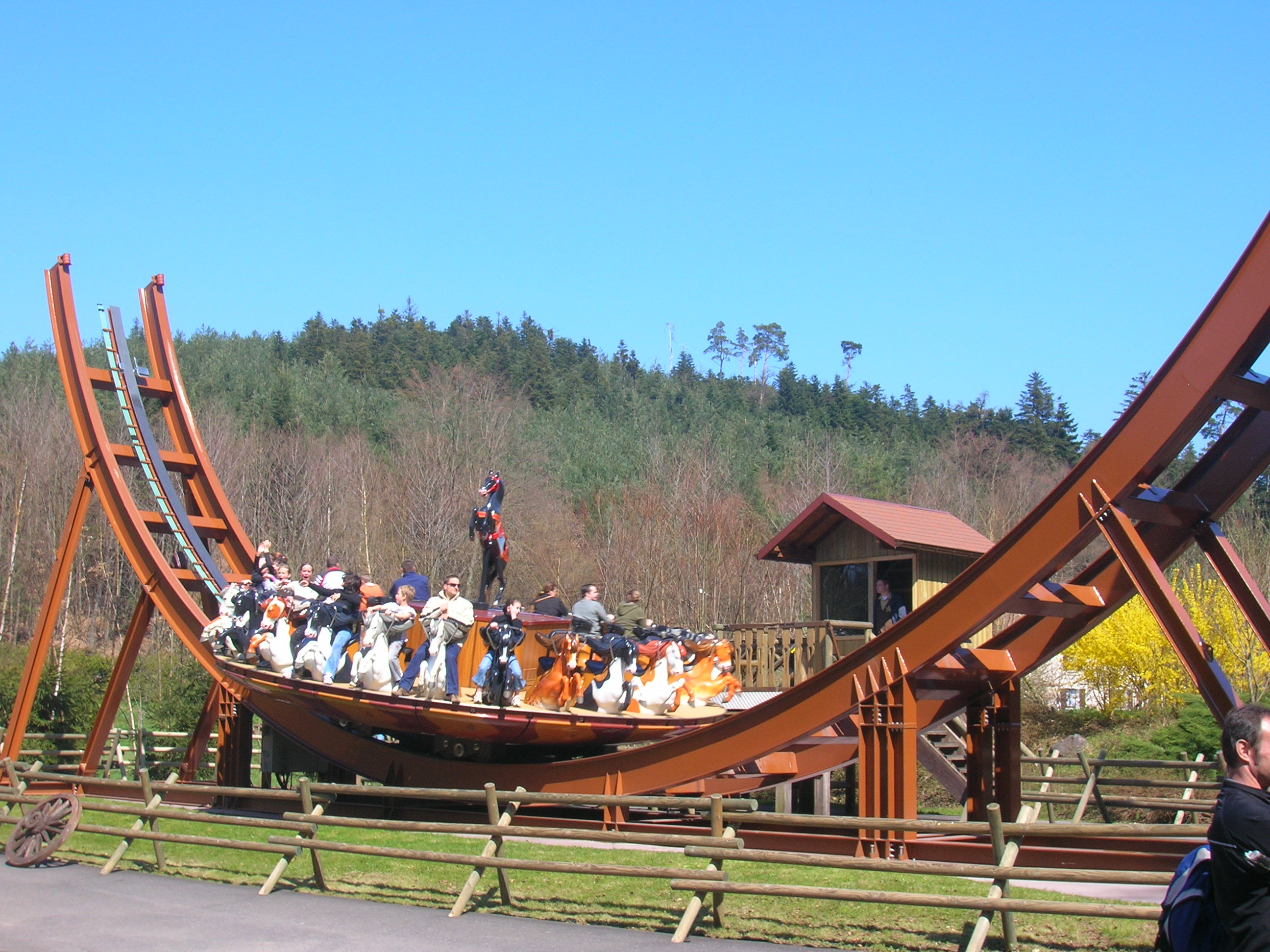
A standard Disk'O at Fraispertuis City, France

The Disk'O (also known as Skater or Surf's Up) is a type of flat ride manufactured by Zamperla of Italy. The ride is a larger version of a Rockin' Tug, also manufactured by Zamperla.

== Versions ==
Model name	Length	Width	Height	Riders	Capacity	Description	Portable	Notes
Skater	21.5 m (71 ft)	11.65 m (38.2 ft)	10.69 m (35.1 ft)	24	600	Small halfpipe with inwards-facing seats.	Yes	
Disk'O	24.55 m (80.5 ft)	9.68 m (31.8 ft)	10 m (33 ft)	24	600	Small halfpipe with outwards-facing seats.	Yes	
Surf's Up	29 m (95 ft)	11 m (36 ft)	7.5 m (25 ft)	20	480	Small halfpipe with hill in middle. Guests stand on rectangular platform.	Yes	
Mega Disk'O	37.5 m (123 ft)	10 m (33 ft)	15.5 m (51 ft)	24	600	Large halfpipe with outwards-facing seats.	No	
Mega Disk'O	37.5 m (123 ft)	10 m (33 ft)	15.5 m (51 ft)	40	1000	Large halfpipe with outwards-facing seats.	No	
Skater Coaster	81.5 m (267 ft)	11.3 m (37 ft)	15.5 m (51 ft)	36	500	Large halfpipe with hill in middle. Inwards-facing seats shaped like a skateboard.	No	
Disk'O Coaster	81.5 m (267 ft)	11.3 m (37 ft)	15.5 m (51 ft)	24	500	Large halfpipe with hill in middle. Outwards-facing seats.	No	
Disk'O Coaster	81.5 m (267 ft)	11.3 m (37 ft)	15.5 m (51 ft)	40	600	Large halfpipe with hill in middle. Outwards-facing seats.	No	

== Ride ==
On a traditional Disk'O, Mega Disk'O or Disk'O Coaster, riders sit on a circular platform with outward-facing seats. On a Skater or a Skater Coaster, riders sit on a rectangular platform with inwards facing seats. On a Surf's Up, riders stand on a rectangular platform. Regardless of the model, the ride experience is very similar. The platform moves back and forth along a halfpipe track while spinning. A Disk'O Coaster or a Skater Coaster both feature a small hill in the middle of the halfpipe.

== Installations ==
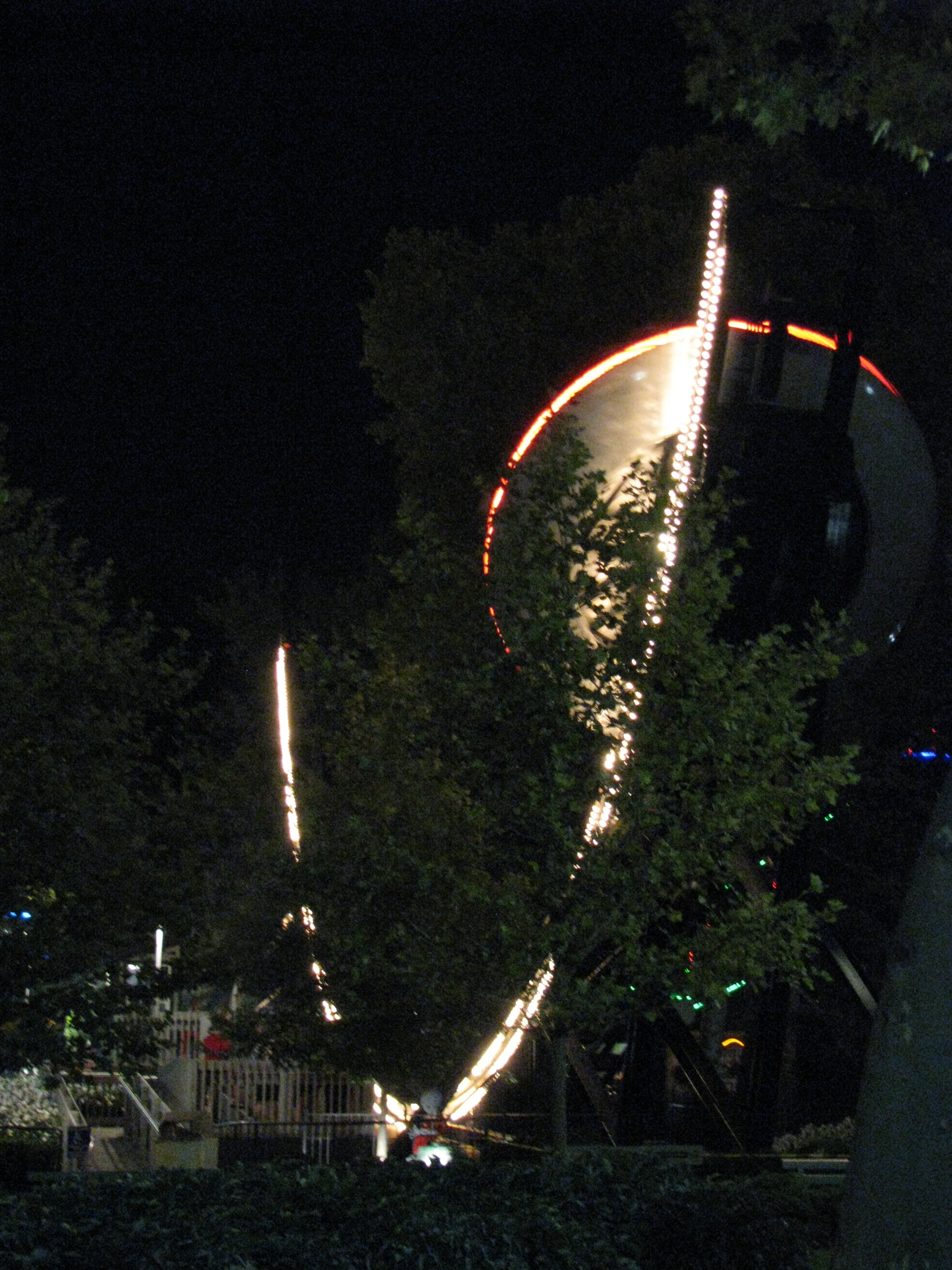
Cosmic Chaos at Kennywood, US

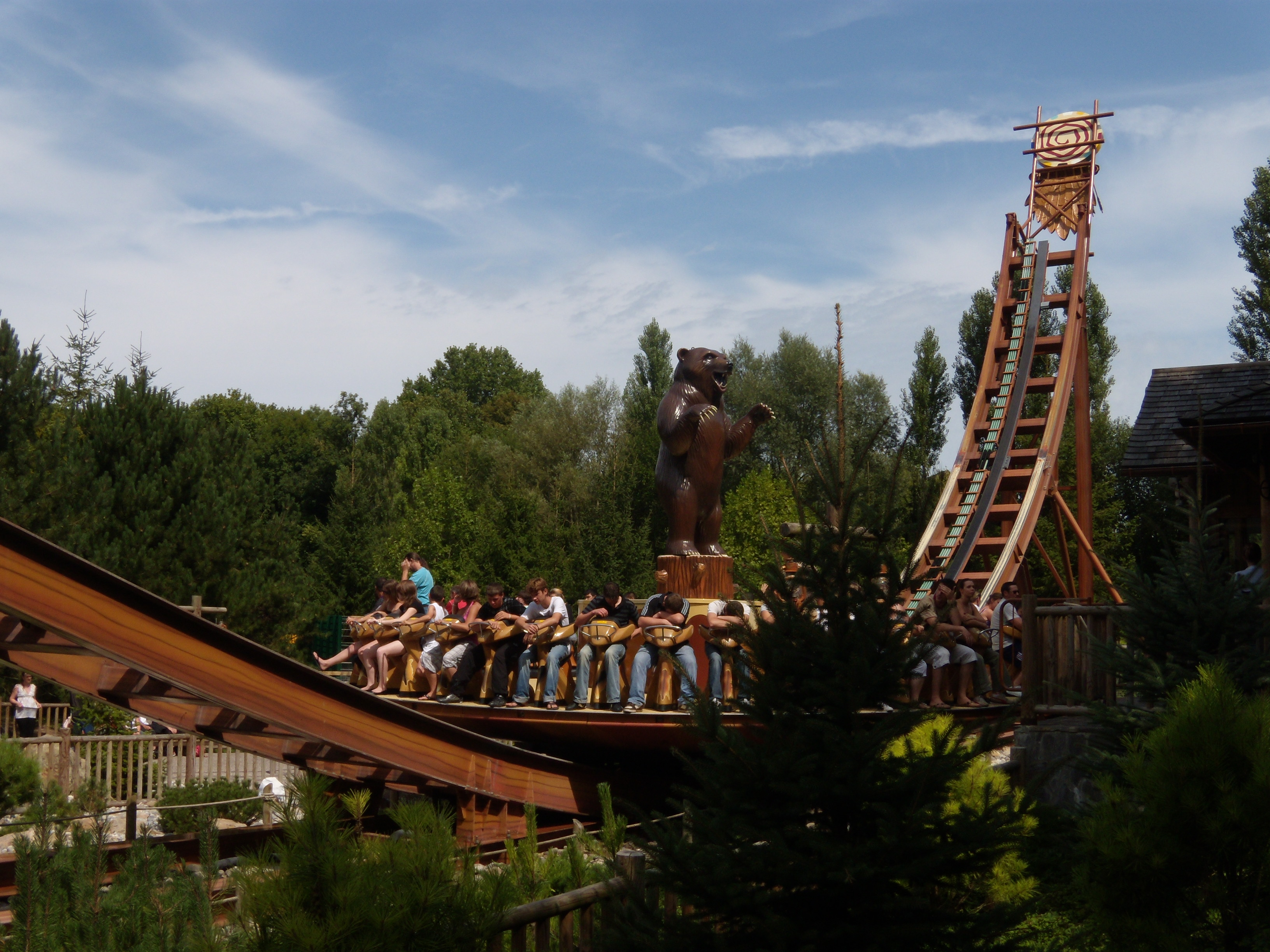
Disk'O Coaster at Nigloland, France

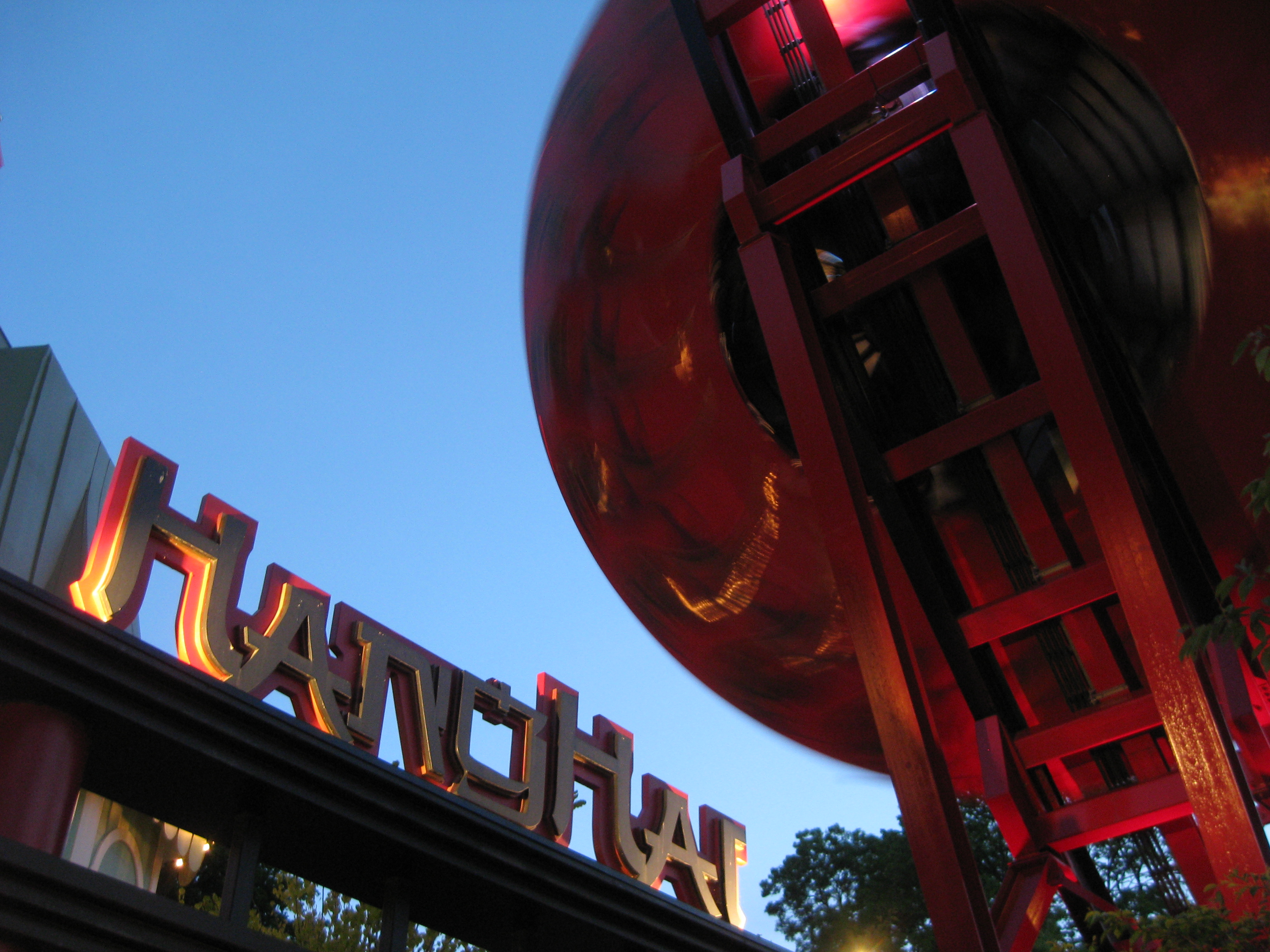
Hanghai at Liseberg, Sweden

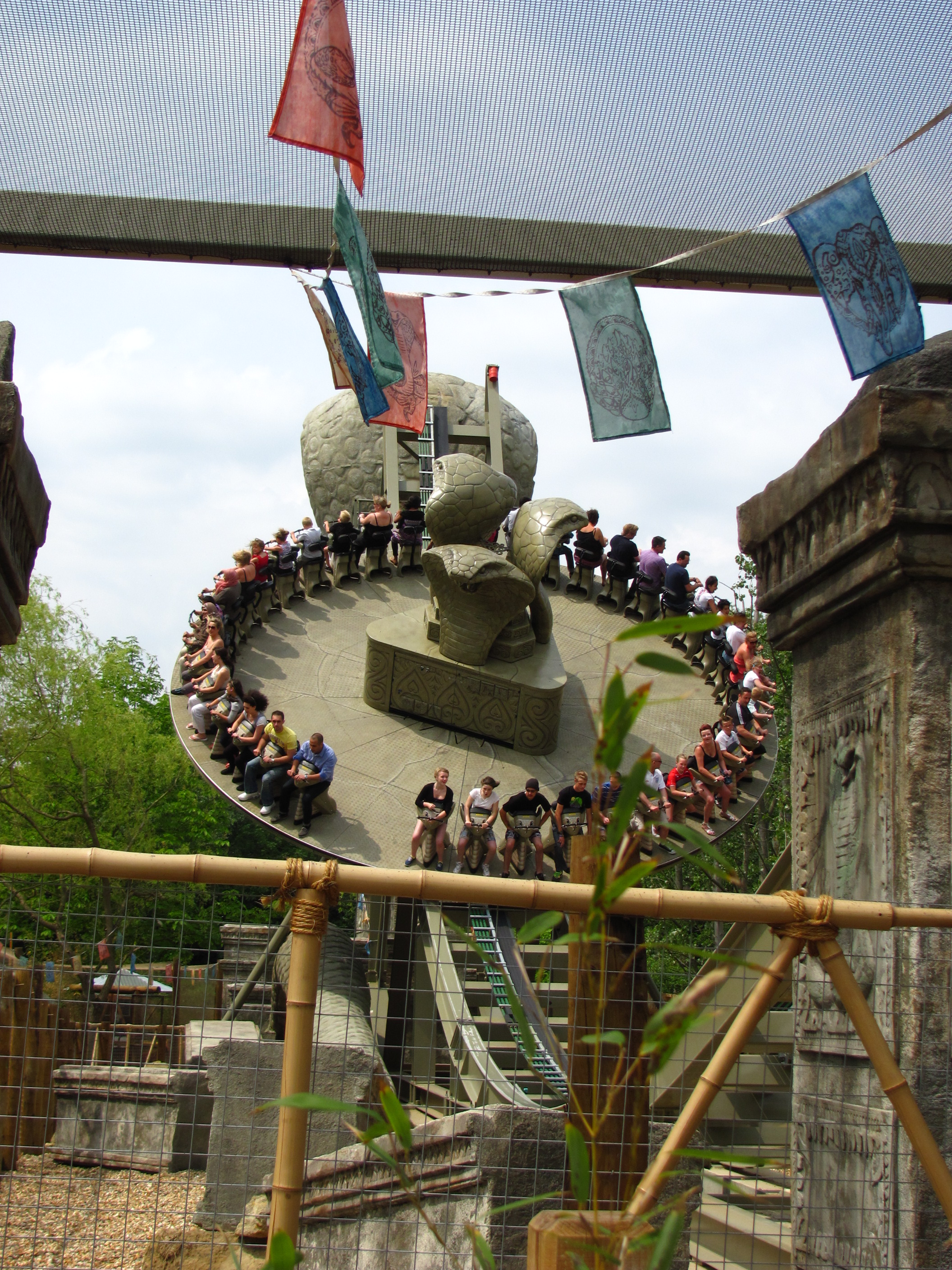
Kobra at Chessington World of Adventures, UK

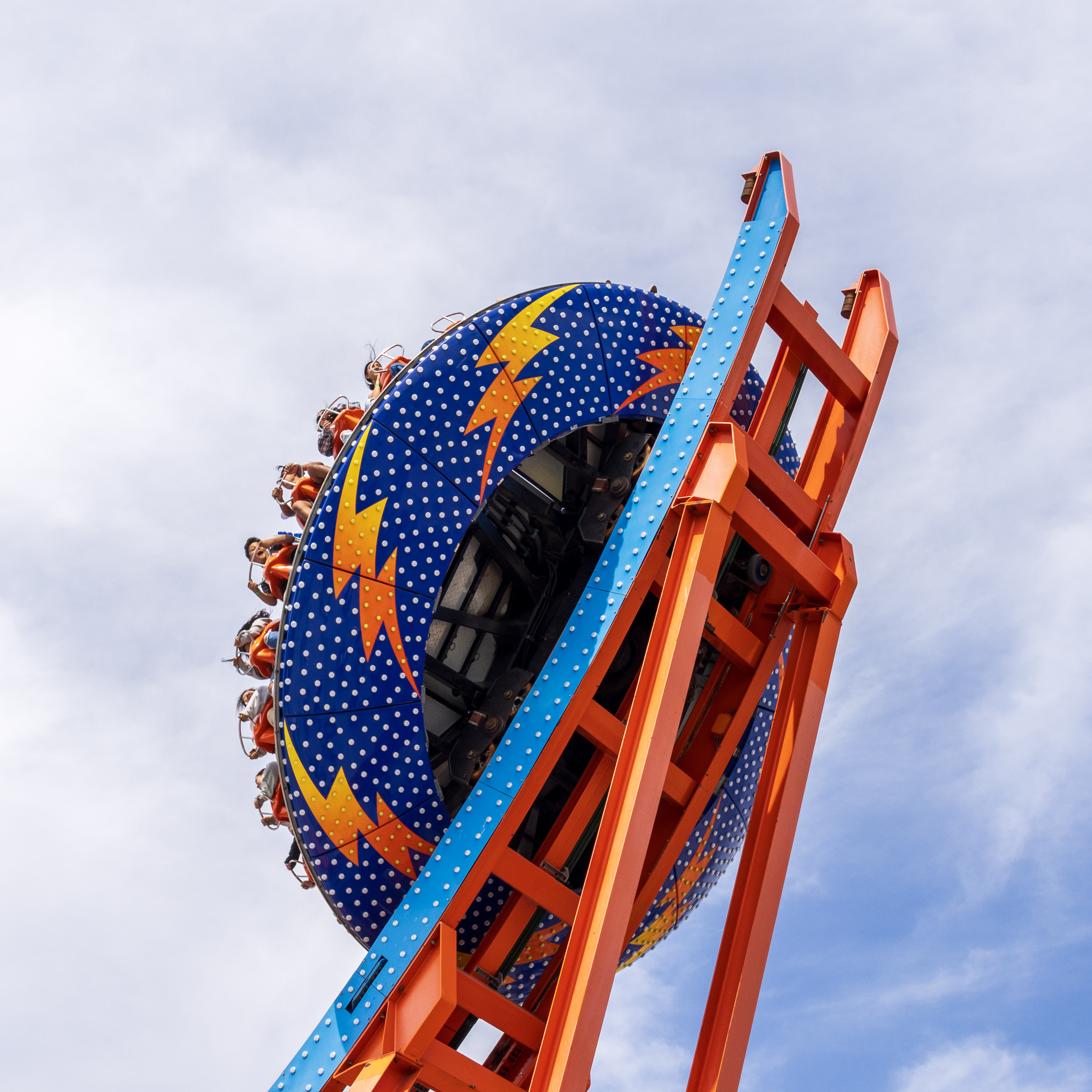
Shockwave at Santa Cruz Beach Boardwalk, US

Name	Park	Location	Model	Opened	Status	Ref
Disk'O	Jungleland	Indonesia	Disk'O	Unknown	Operating	
Disk'O	Hanayashiki	Japan	Disk'O	Unknown	Operating	
Disk'O	Preston Palace	Netherlands	Disk'O	Unknown	Operating	
Disk'O	iT'Z Willowbrook	United States	Disk'O	Unknown	Operating	
Alba-Tossen	BonBon-Land	Denmark	Disk'O	2004	Operating	
Disk'O	Cypress Gardens	United States	Disk'O	2004	Removed	
Disk'O	Golf N' Stuff	United States	Disk'O	2004	Operating	
Disk'O	Great Yarmouth Pleasure Beach	United Kingdom	Disk'O	2004	Operating	
Ramba Zamba	Adventure Island	United Kingdom	Disk'O	2004	Operating	
Ciklón	Isla Mágica	Spain	Disk'O	2005	Removed	
Disk'O	Fantasilandia	Chile	Disk'O	2005	Operating	
Disk'O	Mt. Olympus Water & Theme Park	United States	Disk'O	2005	Removed	
Dizzy Disk	Dollywood	United States	Disk'O	2005	Removed	
La Cavalerie	Fraispertuis City	France	Disk'O	2005	Operating	
Navigator	Flamingo Land	United Kingdom	Mega Disk'O	2005	Operating	
Skater	Canobie Lake Park	United States	Skater	2005	Operating	
Trombi	Tykkimäki	Finland	Disk'O	2005	Operating	
Coaster Brontosaurus	China Dinosaurs Park	China	Disk'O Coaster	2006	Operating	
Disk'O	Go Karts Plus	United States	Disk'O	2006	Operating	
Disk'O	Happy Valley Beijing	China	Disk'O	2006	Operating	
Disk'O	Happy Valley Chengdu	China	Disk'O	2006	Operating	
Disk'O	Parque de Diversiones	Costa Rica	Mega Disk'O	2006	Operating	
Electro Spin	Silver Dollar City	United States	Mega Disk'O	2006	Operating	
Le Grizzli	Nigloland	France	Disk'O Coaster	2006	Operating	
Moto Disco	Jin Jiang Action Park	China	Disk'O	2006	Operating	
Surf Dog; Formerly Avatar The Last Air Bender	Kings Island	United States	Skater Coaster	2006	Operating	
Tiki Twirl; Formerly Survivor: The Ride	California's Great America	United States	Disk'O Coaster	2006	Operating	
UFO	Happy Valley Shenzhen	China	Disk'O	2006	Operating	
Cosmic Chaos	Kennywood	United States	Mega Disk'O	2007	Operating	
Crazy Surfer	Movie Park Germany	Germany	Disk'O Coaster	2007	Operating	
Disk'O	Adventuredome	United States	Disk'O	2007	Operating	
Disk'O	Casino Pier	United States	Disk'O	2007	Operating	
Disk'O	Oaks Amusement Park	United States	Disk'O	2007	Operating	
Disk'O	Yokohama Cosmo World	Japan	Disk'O	2007	Operating	
Le Disque du Soleil	Le Pal	France	Disk'O Coaster	2007	Operating	
Disk'O	Wunderland Kalkar	Germany	Disk'O	2008	Operating	
Disk'O Flashback Boogie Ride	Wild Waves Theme Park	United States	Disk'O	2008	Operating	
Jurakán	Xetulul	Guatemala	Disk'O	2008	Operating	
Tifón	Parque de Atracciones de Madrid	Spain	Mega Disk'O	2008	Operating	
Disk'O	Happy Valley Shanghai	China	Disk'O Coaster	2009	Operating	
Edge	Paultons Park	United Kingdom	Disk'O Coaster	2009	Operating	
Girabugia	Miragica	Italy	Disk'O Coaster	2009	Park closed	
HangHai	Liseberg	Sweden	Mega Disk'O	2009	Operating	
Mega Disk'O	Fantasy Island	United States	Mega Disk'O	2009	Removed	
Mega Vortex	Waldameer & Water World	United States	Mega Disk'O	2009	Operating	
Surf's Up	Fun Spot America	United States	Surf's Up	2009	Removed	
Surf's Up	Minitalia Leolandia Park	Italy	Surf's Up	2009	Operating	
The Invader	Rainbow's End	New Zealand	Disk'O Coaster	2009	Operating	
Tyrsky	Särkänniemi	Finland	Disk'O Coaster	2009	Operating	
Disk'O	OCT East	China	Disk'O	2010	Operating	
Electro Spin	Luna Park	United States	Mega Disk'O	2010	Operating	
Electro Spin	Parc du Bocasse	France	Mega Disk'O	2010	Operating	
Goon-E	Electric Daisy Carnival	Various locations	Disk'O	2010	Operating	
Grand Tournoi	Festyland	France	Mega Disk'O	2010	Operating	
Kobra	Chessington World of Adventures	United Kingdom	Disk'O Coaster	2010	Ride dismantled on site, moving to new location in the park.	
La Déferlante	Parc Ange Michel	France	Disk'O	2010	Operating	
Mega Disk'O	Kaeson Youth Park	North Korea	Mega Disk'O	2010	Operating	
Revolution 360	Seabreeze	United States	Disk'O	2010	Operating	
Surf's Up	Luna Park	United States	Surf's Up	2010	Removed	
Avatar Airbender	Pleasure Beach Blackpool	United Kingdom	Mega Disk'O	2011	Operating	
Giant Redback	Aussie World	Australia	Disk'O	2011	Operating	
Rev-O-Lution	Lake Compounce	United States	Mega Disk'O	2011	Operating	
Shockwave	Dreamworld	Australia	Disk'O Coaster	2011	Operating	
Disk'O	Happy Valley Wuhan	China	Disk'O	2012	Operating	
Disk'O	Victory Kingdom	China	Disk'O	2012	Operating	
Disk'O Magic	Enchanted Kingdom	Philippines	Disk'O	2012	Operating	
Temp'O	Dennlys Parc	France	Mega Disk'O	2012	Operating	
De Grote Golf	Plopsaland	Belgium	Disk'O Coaster	2013	Operating	
Gyro Spin	Lotte World	South Korea	Mega Disk'O	2013	Operating	
Mega Disk'O	Didi'Land	France	Mega Disk'O	2013	Operating	
Tail Spin	Wild Adventures	United States	Mega Disk'O	2013	Operating	
Black Witch Knight	Quancheng Euro Park	China	Disk'O	2014	Operating	
Northern Lights	Valleyfair	United States	Skater Coaster	2014	Operating	
Pipe Scream	Cedar Point	United States	Skater Coaster	2014	Operating	
Jetspin	Brean Leisure Park	United Kingdom	Disk'O	2015	Operating	
Kong	West Midland Safari Park	United Kingdom	Mega Disk'O	2015	Operating	
L'Apache	Papéa Parc	France	Mega Disk'O	2015	Operating	
Mia's Riding Adventure	Legoland Florida	United States	Disk'O	2015	Operating	
Mia's Riding Adventure	Legoland Windsor	United Kingdom	Mega Disk'O	2015	Operating	
Buffalo Bill Rodeo	Mirabilandia	Italy	Disk'O Coaster	2016	Operating	
Discobélix	Parc Astérix	France	Disk'O Coaster	2016	Operating	
Hurricane Force 5	Six Flags Fiesta Texas	United States	Disk'O	2016	Operating	
Le Simoun	La Mer De Sable	France	Disk'O	2016	Operating	
Moto Disk'O	Parque Mundo Aventura	Colombia	Disk'O	2016	Operating	
Het DrakenNest	Avonturenpark Hellendoorn	Netherlands	Mega Disk'O	2017	Operating	
Shockwave	Santa Cruz Beach Boardwalk	United States	Disk'O	2017	Operating	
Spinsanity	Six Flags St. Louis	United States	Mega Disk'O	2017	Operating	
Wave Rider	Park at OWA	United States	Disk'O Coaster	2017	Operating	
The Riddler Revolution	Warner Bros. World Abu Dhabi	United Arab Emirates	Disk'O Coaster	2018	Operating	
El Trompo	Kataplum!	(Mexico) México	Mega Disk'O	2018	Operating	
Surf's Up; Relocated from Fun Spot America	Shining Waters Family Fun Park	Canada	Surf's Up	2018	Operating	
Dino Disk'O	Parc Saint Paul	France	Disk'O Coaster	2019	Operating	
Disk'O	Wonderland Eurasia	Turkey	Disk'O Coaster	2019	SBNO (Park closed)	
Dragonator	Playland (New York)	United States	Disk'O	2019	Operating	
Fliegender Regenschirm (flying umbrella)	Karls Erlebnis-Dorf Elstal	Germany	Disk'O Coaster	2021	Operating	
Tidal Wave Twister	Energylandia	Poland	Disk'O Coaster	2021	Operating	
Wielka Fala	Majaland Kownaty	Poland	Disk'O Coaster	2020	Operating	
The Big Wave	Holiday Park, Germany	Germany	Disk'O Coaster	2021	Operating	
Shaman's Curse	Lost Island Theme Park	United States	Disk'O Coaster	2022	Operating	
Thor	Drayton Manor Resort	United Kingdom	Disk'O Coaster	2022	Operating	
Air Walker	Carowinds	United States	Disk'O Coaster	2023	Operating	
Spinosaurus	Djurs Sommerland	Denmark	Disk'O Coaster	2023	Operating	
Spin Blast	Beto Carrero World	Brazil	Disk'O Coaster	2023	Operating	
Lunar Express	Orion (VDNH)	Russia	Disk'O Coaster	2023	Operating	
Cyclone	Dream World	Thailand	Disk’O Coaster	2025	Operating	
