= King Cobra (disambiguation) =

The King cobra is the world's longest venomous snake.

King Cobra may also refer to:

== People and characters ==
- King Cobra (wrestler), born James Kimble, a professional wrestler from United States Wrestling Association
- George Weingeroff, a professional wrestler from Championship Wrestling from Florida
- Andrew Tate, a British American social media personality and former kickboxer

=== Fictional characters ===
- Cobra (Marvel Comics)
- King Cobra (DC Comics)
- Kobra (DC Comics)
- A British superhero appearing in The Hotspur

== Places ==
- King Cobra Cluster, a star cluster in the Milky Way Galaxy

=== Facilities and structures ===
- King Cobra (roller coaster), a roller coaster at Kings Island
- King Cobra (ride), a water slide at Six Flags Hurricane Harbor

== Groups, organizations ==
- King Kobra, a 1980s hard rock band
- King Cobras (gang), a gang in New Zealand

== Food, drink, cuisine ==
- King Cobra, a variety of lager beer produced by British beer company Cobra Beer
- King Cobra (malt liquor), a brand of malt liquor

== Movies ==
- King Cobra (1999 film), a 1999 horror film
- King Cobra (2016 film), a 2016 biographical crime-drama film
- Jaws of Satan, a 1982 horror film whose working title was King Cobra

== Transportation and vehicular ==
- Bell 309 King Cobra, a prototype attack helicopter
- P-63 Kingcobra, a Second World War fighter aircraft

== Other ==
- Colt King Cobra, a firearm

== See also ==
- Cobra King (disambiguation)
- Cobra (disambiguation)
- King (disambiguation)
- Kingsnake, members of the genus Lampropeltis
