= Self-Reliant Defense Posture (Philippines) =

Philippine national security policy and defense industry framework

Self-Reliant Defense Posture (SRDP)
- Country: Philippines
- Established: March 19, 1974
- Revitalized: October 8, 2024
- Legal basis: Presidential Decree No. 415 (1974); Republic Act No. 12024 (2024)
- Primary agency: Department of National Defense
- Focus: Defense industry, National security, Manufacturing

The Self-Reliant Defense Posture (SRDP) is a national security policy of the Philippines intended to develop a domestic defense industrial base. The program seeks to reduce reliance on foreign military suppliers by facilitating the local production of equipment for the Armed Forces of the Philippines (AFP).

== History ==
=== Early implementation (1974–1986) ===
The SRDP was established on March 19, 1974, by President Ferdinand Marcos through Presidential Decree No. 415. Notable projects during this period included Project Santa Barbara, which involved the development of the "Bongbong I" rocket, and the licensed production of M16A1 rifles by Elisco Tool Manufacturing Company. While the program produced over 150,000 rifles, it faced long-term sustainability issues due to reliance on imported raw materials and specialized parts.

=== Revitalization (2024) ===
On October 8, 2024, President Bongbong Marcos signed Republic Act No. 12024, or the Self-Reliant Defense Posture Revitalization Act. The law was introduced to address security concerns in the West Philippine Sea and to formalize a "Filipino-first" preference in defense procurement.

== Current and future programs ==
Following the enactment of Republic Act No. 12024 in late 2024, the SRDP has pivoted toward high-technology "asymmetric" capabilities and localized assembly of major platforms through technology transfer agreements.

=== Indigenous weapon systems ===
Project BUHAWI: Developed by the DOST-MIRDC, the "Building a Universal Mount for Heavy-Barrel Automated Weapon Integration" (BUHAWI) is a locally designed remote-controlled weapon station (RCWS) for .50 caliber machine guns. It is primarily intended for the Philippine Navy's small patrol craft.

Project COBRA: The Controller Operated Battle Ready Armament (COBRA) is an automated gun mount designed for the Philippine Army's armored vehicles, allowing troops to engage targets from within the safety of the hull.

=== Unmanned systems and drones ===
The Air Force Research and Development Center (AFRDC) and the Navy have accelerated the development of homegrown unmanned platforms:

Ordnance-carrying drones: The AFRDC has developed the "Air Mobility Ordnance Carrier" (AMOC) and "Military Air Ordnance Yielder" (MAOY), which are vertical take-off and landing (VTOL) drones capable of dropping munitions.

Unmanned surface vehicles (USVs): As part of the 2025-2026 roadmap, the Navy is prioritizing the local production of USVs for maritime domain awareness and "asymmetric" defense in the West Philippine Sea.

=== Strategic partnerships and assembly ===
Naval shipbuilding: Under a technology transfer agreement with Israel Shipyards Ltd., the Philippine Navy began the domestic assembly of Shaldag MK V (Kingfisher) fast-attack interdiction craft at the Naval Shipbuilding Center in Cavite.

Missile maintenance and production: Following the acquisition of the BrahMos missile system, the Philippine government is exploring the establishment of local Maintenance, Repair, and Overhaul (MRO) facilities. In early 2026, Indian defense firms proposed setting up full production lines for missiles and air defense systems within the Philippines to support the SRDP framework.

Cyber defense: RA 12024 specifically mandates the inclusion of cyber defense tools and digital infrastructure as part of the national defense industry to counter unconventional threats.

=== Special Defense Economic Zone (SpeDEZ) ===
Approved in 2025, the SpeDEZ in Bataan is designed to be the "Silicon Valley of Defense" for the Philippines. It aims to host international companies that will partner with local firms to produce advanced electronics, composite materials for aircraft, and tactical communications equipment.

== Challenges and criticism ==
Despite its objectives, the SRDP has historically faced significant hurdles:

- Funding and sustainability: Analysts have noted that domestic production often costs more than purchasing "off-the-shelf" equipment from foreign allies due to a lack of economies of scale.
- Technological gaps: The Philippines lacks a heavy industrial base, meaning even "locally made" equipment often remains dependent on foreign-sourced engines, sensors, and electronics.
- Historical mismanagement: Critics point to past failures where political shifts and allegations of corruption led to the abandonment of promising projects, such as the rocket program and certain armored vehicle prototypes.

== See also ==
- AFP Modernization Act
