= Cobra King =

Cobra King may refer to:

- Cobra King (tank), the first tank to relieve the siege of Bastogne
- Cobra King radar, a radar system carried by USNS Howard O. Lorenzen
- The Cobra King of Kathmandu, the third novel in the Children of the Lamp trilogy

== See also ==
- King Cobra (disambiguation)
- Cobra (disambiguation)
- King (disambiguation)
