= Cobra (disambiguation) =

A cobra is any of several species of snake usually belonging to the family Elapidae.

Cobra or COBRA may also refer to:

== Arts and entertainment ==
=== Fictional entities ===
- Cobra (G.I. Joe), the enemy faction in the G.I. Joe: A Real American Hero toy line and its related media
- Cobra (Marvel Comics), various Marvel Comics characters
- Cobra Unit, in the video game Metal Gear Solid 3: Snake Eater
- Professor Cobra, a villain and member of the Martian Empire in the third season of Yu-Gi-Oh GX
- Cobra, a fictional engineered virus in Richard Preston's novel The Cobra Event
- Cobra MkIV, a heavier multipurpose ship from the Elite Dangerous universe
- Cobra, a supervillain and assassin in the comic book series Haunt
- Cobra Bubbles, a social worker and former CIA agent from Disney's Lilo & Stitch franchise

=== Film and television ===
- Cobra (1925 film), an American silent film
- Cobra (1986 film), an American action film
- Cobra (1991 film), a Pakistani film
- Cobra (2012 film), an Indian Malayalam-language film
- Cobra (2022 film), an Indian Tamil-language film
- The Cobra (film), a 1967 Italian film
- Cobra (American TV series), a 1993–1994 American action television series
- COBRA (British TV series), a 2020–2023 British political thriller television series
- Cobra Video, an American gay pornographic studio
- Space Adventure Cobra: The Movie or Cobra, based on the manga of the same name
- Cobra Kai a 2018–2025 a Netflix Series

=== Literature ===
- Cobra, a 1972 novel by Cuban author Severo Sarduy
- Cobra (manga), 1978, by Buichi Terasawa
- COBRA (Timothy Zahn novel series), a novel series by Timothy Zahn and the first (1985) novel in the series
- The Cobra (novel), a 2010 thriller novel by Frederick Forsyth

=== Music ===
- Cobra (American band), a 1980s hard rock band
- Cobra (Chinese band), a Chinese all-female rock band
- Cobra (Japanese band), a Japanese punk band
- The Cobras, an American band in the late 1970s which featured Stevie Ray Vaughan
- Cobra (album), 1987, by John Zorn
- Cobra (soundtrack), by A. R. Rahman for the 2022 Indian film
- Cobra (Zorn), a musical composition by John Zorn
- "C.O.B.R.A.", a song by Marie-Mai
- "Cobra" (Megan Thee Stallion song), 2023
- "Cobra", a 2004 song by Winnebago Deal
- "Cobra", a song by Geese from the 2025 album Getting Killed
- "Cobra", a song by Lisa from the 2026 EP Press Play
- "Cobra" (composition), a 2011 instrumental composition by Hardwell
- Cobra Records, an independent record label (1956–1959)

=== Roller coasters ===
- Cobra (La Ronde), Canada
- Cobra (Tivoli Friheden), Denmark
- Raven (Paultons Park), originally under the name Cobra, Hampshire, England
- Cobra (PowerPark), Finland
- Cobra, a roller coaster at Six Flags Discovery Kingdom, California, US

=== Other arts and entertainment ===
- COBRA (art movement), active from 1948 to 1951

== Government and police ==
- Coastal Barrier Resources Act, a U.S. act of 1982
- Cabinet Office Briefing Rooms, the UK government's crisis response committees
- Cobras (Serbia), a Serbian military police unit
- Commando Battalion for Resolute Action, an Indian paramilitary unit
- Consolidated Omnibus Budget Reconciliation Act of 1985, a US federal statute, or health insurance provided under the act
- EKO Cobra, an Austrian counter-terror police squad
- Zulaiê Cobra (born 1943), Brazilian politician

== Places ==
- Cobra Station, a sheep station in Western Australia
- Ilha das Cobras, an island in Rio de Janeiro, Brazil

== Products and companies ==
- Cobra Beer, produced in the UK
- Cobra Golf, a brand of golf clubs and outdoor equipment
- The Cobra Group, a marketing company
- Cobra Energy Drink, an energy drink produced by Philippines-based Asia Brewery

== Science and technology ==
=== Vehicles ===
==== Automobiles ====
- AC Cobra, a British sports car built in the 1960s, known in the US as Ford/Shelby Cobra
- Ford Falcon Cobra, a limited edition of the Ford Falcon
- Ford Mustang SVT Cobra, a sports car built by Ford between 1993 and 2004
- Ford Shelby Cobra Concept, a 2004 Ford concept car based on the 1960s Cobra
- Cobra, a 1960s Ford Shelby Mustang variant
- Torino Cobra, a 1968–1971 model of the Ford Torino

==== Military ====
- COBRA (radar), a counter-battery radar system
- Cobra BMT-2 APC, an Iranian armored personnel carrier
- ACEC Cobra, a Belgian Army armored personnel carrier
- Bell AH-1 Cobra, a US Army attack helicopter
- Controller Operated Battle Ready Armament, a Philippine remote controlled weapon station
- HMS Cobra (1899), a British Royal Navy destroyer
- Otokar Cobra, a Turkish light armoured vehicle
- Northrop YF-17, a fighter aircraft prototype nicknamed Cobra
- USS Cobra (SP-626), a US Navy patrol boat

==== Other vehicles ====
- Bombardier Cobra, in Zürich, Switzerland
- Evektor VUT100 Cobra, a Czech light aircraft
- SZD-36 Cobra 15, a type of sailplane built in Poland in the 1970s

=== Weapons ===
- Cobra (missile), a Swiss/German anti-tank missile
- Colt Cobra, a line of small-caliber revolvers

=== Other science and technology ===
- Cobra (programming language), a computer programming language
- Cobra ciphers, a series of block ciphers in cryptography
- COBRA rocket engine, proposed by Pratt & Whitney-Aerojet for the US Space Launch Initiative
- CobraNet, a proprietary system for transmitting digital audio over Ethernet
- COBRAcable, a submarine power cable under construction between the Netherlands and Denmark
- Combined bisulfite restriction analysis, a molecular biology technique
- Ericofon, or Cobra Phone, a landmark of 20th century industrial design
- Novell "Cobra", codename for Novell NetWare 5.1
- CoBra, an automobile engine made by Crosley
- Cobra, a ZX Spectrum clone built in Braşov, Romania; see List of ZX Spectrum clones
- Cobra, a processor in the IBM RS64 line of CPUs
- COBRA Experiment, neutrinoless double beta decay expriment

== Sport ==
=== Teams and clubs ===
- Adelaide Cobras FC, an Australian soccer club
- Bangkok Cobras, an Asean Basketball League team
- Cape Cobras, a cricket team based in Cape Town, South Africa
- Carolina Cobras, a former Arena Football team (2000–2004)
- Charlotte Cobras, a Major Indoor Lacrosse League team in 1996
- Chicago Cobras, a former American women's soccer club (2003–2004)
- Cleveland Cobras, an American soccer club
- Cobra Sport, a South Sudanese basketball team
- Cobras de Ciudad Juárez, a Mexican football club
- COBRA Rugby Club of Malaysia
- Lapua Cobras, a Finnish basketball team
- Nordsjælland Cobras, a Danish ice hockey team
- SWU Cobras, the sports teams of Southwestern University of Cebu City, Philippines
- Terrebonne Cobras, a Canadian Junior ice hockey team
- Cobra Energy Drink Iron Men, former Basketball Team in PBA D-League

=== People ===
- Jeff Farmer (wrestler) (born 1962), American professional wrestler
- Carl Froch (born 1977), boxing world champion
- Jelle Klaasen (born 1984), Dutch darts player
- Juan José Muñante (1948–2019), soccer player
- Dave Parker (born 1951), former Major League Baseball player
- Gary Simmons (ice hockey) (born 1944), NHL goaltender
- George Takano (born 1958), Japanese professional wrestler
- Mad Cobra (born 1968), or simply Cobra, stage name of Jamaican musician Ewart Everton Brown
- Michael Willson, a.k.a. Cobra, from the TV show Gladiators

=== Other sport and fitness ===
- Bhujangasana, a yoga posture known as Cobra Pose
- The Cobra, a wrestling move used by Santino Marella (born 1979)

== Other uses ==
- Cobra: Game of the Normandy Breakout, a 1977 board wargame about the Battle of Normandy during World War II
- COBRA (consumer theory) (consumer's online brand related activities)
- Cobra maneuver, an aerobatics maneuver
- Operation Cobra, a 1944 World War II battle
- Robert Hatem (b. c. 1956), Lebanese former bodyguard and non-fiction writer also known by his codename, Cobra
- Typhoon Cobra, a Pacific storm

== See also ==
- Kobra (disambiguation)
- Common Object Request Broker Architecture (CORBA), a computer communications standard
