= Kobra =

Kobra may refer to:

== Places ==
- Kobra, Estonia, village in Vändra Parish, Pärnu County, Estonia

== Comics, games and amusements ==
- Kobra (Mortal Kombat), a character from the Mortal Kombat series of fighting games
- Kobra (DC Comics), a 1976 villain in the DC Comics universe
- Kobra (comic book), the title and main character of a Yugoslav comic book
- Kobra Khan, a character from the Masters of the Universe franchise
- Kobra (ride), a Zamperla flat ride based in Chessington World Of Adventures, a theme park in London

== People ==
- Eduardo Kobra (born 1976), Brazilian graffiti artist known as Kobra
- Kobra Paige (born 1988), lead vocalist for Canadian heavy metal band Kobra and the Lotus

== Military ==
- 9K112 Kobra, an anti-tank missile system of the Soviet Union
- Otokar Cobra, a Turkish infantry mobility vehicle

== Television ==
- Kobra (TV programme), a 2001 Swedish culture television programme

== Software ==
- KobrA method, as used in Reuters 3000 Xtra; a design process that is supported through a standard approach to constructing software

== Other uses ==
- Maharashtrian Konkanastha Brahmins (abbreviated KoBra), a community in the western state of Maharashtra, India

== See also ==
- Cobra (disambiguation)
