= Project Santa Barbara =

Philippine missile program

- Bukang Liwayway rocket launchers on their way
- Country: Philippines
- Key people: Ferdinand Marcos
- Launched: 1972
- Status: Closed

Project Santa Barbara was a missile program developed under the administration of Philippine president Ferdinand Marcos (1965–86) during the Cold War. The first successful launch was in 1972. The project was discontinued due to undisclosed reasons.

== Background ==
Bongbong
- Function: Research rocket
- Country of origin: Philippines

Launch history
- Status: Retired
- Launch sites: Caballo Island; Fort Magsaysay
- Total launches: 37
- Success(es): 1
- Notable outcome: 36 (status unknown)
- First flight: March 12, 1972

Project Santa Barbara was initiated by the administration of Philippine president Ferdinand Marcos and it involved the Philippine Navy and a group of scientists. It was conceived amidst the United States withdrawal of its armed forces in Indochina and in anticipation that the US would also withdraw its forces stationed in the Philippines.

Under the program, different types of missiles were developed which are intended to intercept land, sea, and air-based threats. There were also plans to export missiles developed under the program to friendly countries.

One of the missiles developed was the Bongbong rocket, named after the moniker of President Marcos' son Ferdinand Jr. The National Aeronautics and Space Administration of the United States described the weapon as the Philippines' first liquid-propellant rocket. The associated weaponry system of the Bongbong rocket is similar to the Soviet unguided artillery Katyusha. The 37 dynamic tests were conducted, with most of the test conducted on Caballo Island. Four of the test were made in Fort Magsaysay.

The first successful launch under the project involved the Bongbong rocket. The launch was made on March 12, 1972 with the rocket retrieved from the South China Sea.

The project was discontinued due to undisclosed reasons.
