= COBRA (consumer theory) =

Framework to understand online behaviour of consumers

COBRA (consumers' online brand related activities) is a theoretical framework related to understanding consumer's behavioural engagement with brands on social media.

Conceptually, the COBRAs concept draws from the work of Shao (2009). The author explored boundaries, in which consumers engage with user-generated media. Shao (2009) suggested that people engage with such media in three ways: by consuming, by participating, and by producing brand-related media.

The concept was further investigated in a qualitative research conducted by Muntinga, Moorman, and Smit in 2011. In their study, the researchers had analyzed data from 20 consumers and suggested three dimensions of analysis: consumption, contribution, and creation.

To validate the COBRAs framework, Schivinski, Christodoulides, and Dabrowski (2016) developed a survey instrument to measure the consumer's engagement with brand-related social-media content, based on three dimensions (i.e., consumption, contribution, and creation) established by Muntinga, Moorman, and Smit (2011). Examples of the application of COBRAs follows:

Consumption: when consumers see a picture or watch a YouTube video displaying a specific brand, e.g., Harley Davidson or Coca-Cola. In doing so, consumers are consuming brand-related media;

Contribution: when consumers engage with online brand-related media by commenting on a post or “Liking” a piece of content, they are moving from the stage of “observer” to a “media contributor”.

Creation: when consumers decide to upload a picture of a brand or product on Facebook, they are creating brand-related content.

== Research on COBRA ==
Research on COBRA is rooted in engagement theories of marketing. Researchers have demonstrated that COBRA is both an emotional and cognitive process that results from the consumer's interactions with brands on social media. The type and intensity of the engagement with firms, services, brands, and products influence consumer behaviour in terms of consuming, contributing, and creation brand-related content on social media.

In addition, it has been shown that COBRAs are differently motivated, depending on the specific type of social media platform.
