= Cobra: Game of the Normandy Breakout =

1977 WWII board wargame

Cover of Strategy & Tactics #65 that included Cobra as a pull-out game

Cobra: Game of the Normandy Breakout, originally titled Cobra: Patton's 1944 Summer offensive in France, is a board wargame published by Simulations Publications Inc. (SPI) in 1977 that simulates the 1944 breakout of Allied forces from Normandy following D-Day.

== Contents ==
Following D-Day, German forces prevented an Allied breakthrough, pinning them in a bridgehead which included the Contentin Peninsula of Normandy for seven weeks. In July 1944, while British and Canadian forces engaged the majority of the German panzer divisions east and south of Caen in Operation Goodwood, the First United States Army under the command of Lieutenant General Omar Bradley, assisted by George S. Patton's Third United States Army, launched Operation Cobra against the remaining German forces in their sector, hoping to break out of the bocages of Normandy and into the open countryside of Brittany.

Cobra is a game in that simulates the summer offensive. Despite only referencing Operation Cobra in its title, the game covers the entire Normandy struggle, both the American "Operation Cobra", and the less successful British/Canadian "Operation Goodwood." It can be played with two players (Germans versus Allies), or as a three-player game, with the American and British/Canadian forces divided between two players.

=== Components ===
The original SPI pull-out edition contains:

- paper map, 22" x 32", scaled at 1 hex = 3.2 km (2 mi)
- 200 die cut double-sided cardboard counters
- 8-page rulebook

The flat-pack version (1977) added a plastic counter tray, clear plastic cover, a small six-sided die, and a cover graphic sheet.

The map is from the west coast of Normandy to the Dives River in the east, and from Bayeux in the north to Alençon in the south.

The TSR edition added the D-Day invasion of 6 June 1944 and the subsequent Battle of Cherbourg and Battle for Caen to the game, requiring another 200 counters, a 16-page rulebook, and an extra map detailing the D-Day invasion.

=== Gameplay ===
The rules are based on the system used in SPI's Panzergruppe Guderian wargame released the previous year, with one important difference: there are no "untried" units in the game — all combat strengths of every unit are known to both players. The game is broken into game turns that each represent 3 days of real time, with the German player going first, and then the Allied player.

German player:

1. German Weather Determination Phase
2. Replacement Phase
3. Initial Movement Phase
4. Combat Phase
5. Mechanized Movement Phase

Allied player:

1. Allied Weather Determination Phase
2. Supply Phase
3. Replacement Phase
4. Initial Movement Phase
5. Combat Phase
6. Mechanized Movement Phase

Due to Allied air superiority, German units can only move their full allowance during storms, 2/3 during overcast weather and 1/3 in clear weather (weather is randomly determined, with the die roll affected by the previous turn's weather, allowing rough forecasts to be made). Units cannot leave a Zone of Control and enter another in the same phase, forcing the German player to keep reserves to plug gaps in his line. The Allies have a limited ability to carpet bomb hexes. As in Panzergruppe Guderian the combat value of a division is doubled if all its component units are stacked together ("divisional integrity"). Major rivers are serious obstacles to movement. The Allies have to choose whether to refrain from attacks to husband supply points for major offensives. In combat, column shifts (i.e. adjustments in the odds) are awarded for terrain, headquarter counters and German Tiger tank battalions. The game begins with a long, slow American grind through the bocage (which reduces movement and restricts advance-after-combat to only one hex) until eventually they achieve a breakthrough.

=== Victory conditions ===
Both players receive victory points for completely destroying enemy units. In addition, the Allied player receives victory points for each mechanized unit that exits off of the western edge of the map (into Brittany) before Turn 7, and the German player receives points for both exiting units off the eastern edge of the map, and for maintaining supplied mechanized units that are east of Falaise and are either out of Allied zones of control or are disengagable. The game ends at the end of Turn 13 — the player with the most victory points is the winner.

An early rule loophole enabled the German panzer divisions to run for the east edge of the map at the start of the game. A rule amendment making the first turn weather always clear made this too risky a strategy.

== Publication history ==
Cobra: Patton's 1944 Summer offensive in France was designed by Brad Hessel, with artwork and graphics by Redmond A. Simonsen, and was published by SPI as a pull-out game in Issue 65 of Strategy & Tactics. It was also released in a "flatpack" game box in 1977, and issued in a "bookcase" box in 1978.

After TSR took over SPI in 1982, they attempted to get a quick return on their money by releasing several SPI games that had been waiting for publication such as Battle Over Britain, and by re-publishing new editions of several popular but out-of-print SPI titles such as Napoleon's Last Battles and a revised and expanded edition of Cobra, retitled Cobra: Game of the Normandy Breakout. As noted above, the TSR edition added the actual D-Day landings and the subsequent establishing of the Allied bridgehead.

In the 21st century, Decision Games acquired the rights to Cobra and published a revised 3rd edition in 2008 retitled Cobra: The Normandy Campaign as a pull-out game in Issue 251 of Strategy & Tactics. Whereas earlier editions had included German corps headquarters and a counter representing General Patton, the 2008 edition added Allied corps headquarters to the game. A Japanese-language version of the 3rd edition was published in Command Magazine Japan #106 in 2012. Decision released a boxed version of the 3rd edition in 2019.

== Reception ==
In The Playboy Winner's Guide to Board Games, game designer Jon Freeman noted that Cobra used the same game system as SPI's previous publication, Panzergruppe Guderian, but thought that Cobra was better balanced, allows a more active role for both players, and is "arguably better than [Panzergruppe Guderian].

In Issue 36 of Moves, David Werden reviewed the original SPI edition and liked the large-scale map of the Falaise Pocket, noting that "this game portrays an encirclement in detail on an entire map instead of in just a few hexes as in most games."

In Issue 44 of Moves, Thomas W. Graveline listed the good points of SPI's edition, saying "The richness of the terrain, the disengagement provisions, the uncertain weather conditions plus the availability of a separate army for each of three players gives this conflict a fullness which transcends even Panzergruppe Guderian."

In The Guide to Simulations/Games for Education and Training, Richard Rydzel noted "Once the fine points of this game are understood, it makes for exciting and realistic play." However he warned, "The slightest mistake on either side could mean defeat." Rydzel concluded, "This is a very good simulation of World War II on the western front."

In The Best of Board Wargaming (1980) Marcus Watney wrote that "every so often a game is published which epitomises the state of the art at that moment, including developments trialled in other games," and Cobra like Panzergruppe Guderian, was such a game. He awarded the game very high ratings for excitement (80%), realism (85%) and solitaire suitability (95%).

In Issue 29 of Imagine, Roger Musson reviewed the 2nd edition of the game published by TSR, and even though he thought SPI's first edition had been "one of the better WWII operational games", he believed TSR's 2nd edition was even better with the expansion of the game to include D-Day operations. Musson thought the game's strengths were that it was "evenly balanced, and thus a good competitive challenge." He concluded with a strong recommendation, saying, "to my mind this is the best playable game on the Normandy campaign — it plays quickly and smoothly, and is very enjoyable. A most welcome re-issue."

In Issue 36 of Phoenix (March–April 1982), Andrew McGee took another look at the five-year old game, and mentioned the original victory conditions, "so badly worded as to make an Allied victory almost impossible", that had been replaced by an official SPI erratum. Despite this revision, McGee still had issues with certain aspects of the game that he felt created an imbalance against the Allied player. He wrote an in-depth examination complete with suggested rules revisions, and concluded, "I believe that the overall result [of these proposed changes] has been to improve the game as a simulation as well as to offer a new challenge."

== Awards ==
At the 2009 Origins Awards, the 3rd edition Cobra: The Normandy Campaign published by Decision Games was a finalist for "Best Magazine-Published Boardgame of 2008."

== Other reviews ==
- Moves #36
- Fire & Movement #10, #19 & #65
- Wargamer's Collector's Journal #6
- Simulacrum #9
- Simulations Canada #16
- Wargame News #33
