= Controller Operated Battle Ready Armament =

Controller Operated Battle Ready Armament (COBRA)
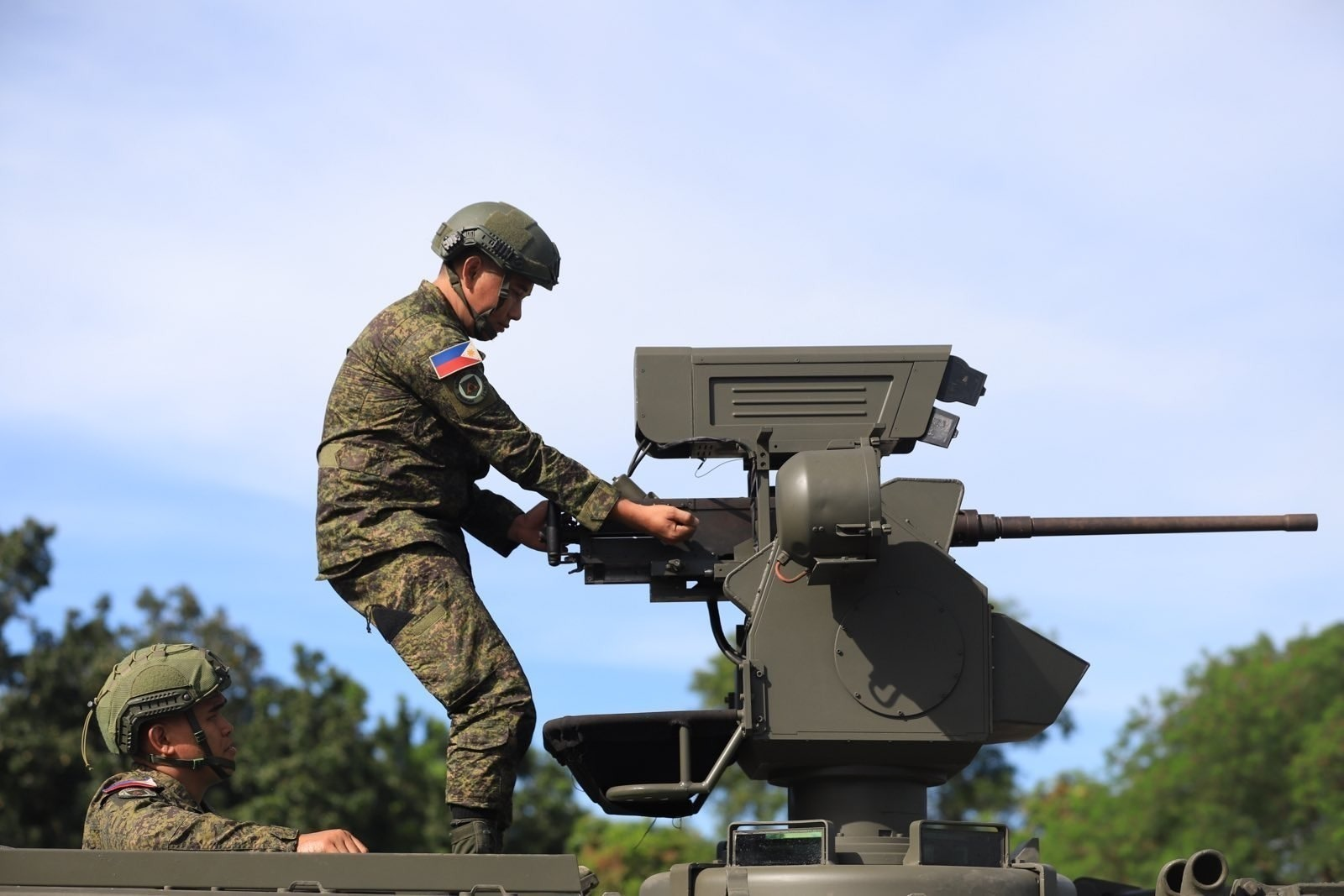
- Philippine Army soldier works the bolt of the M2 Browning mounted on COBRA.
- Type: Remote controlled weapon station
- Place of origin: Philippines

Service history
- Used by: Philippines

Production history
- Designer: Rodnel O. Tamayo
- Designed: 2022–2024
- Manufacturer: Metal Industry Research and Development Center, Department of Science and Technology
- Unit cost: ₱8 million to ₱10 million (estimates)
- Produced: 2024 (small batches)
- No. built: 20 (initial planned production)

Specifications
- Shell: .50 BMG
- Action: Short recoil-operated
- Traverse: 360°
- Sights: Integrated day/night/thermal camera

The Controller Operated Battle Ready Armament (Note: Known as Controller-Operated Battle Ready Armament or Controller Operated Battle-Ready Armament in other sources.) (COBRA) is a Philippine-made remote controlled weapon station (RCWS) developed by Department of Science and Technology in 2022. It was created as part of a defense program of the Armed Forces of the Philippines.

== History ==
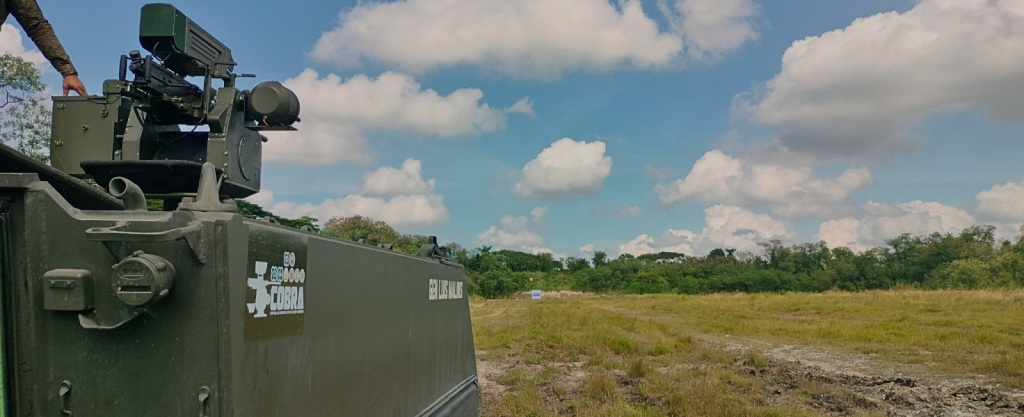
M113 APC General Luis Malinis with the mounted COBRA fired during live drills in Camp O' Donnell.

Development of the COBRA started from November 2022 when a memorandum of agreement was signed by the Department of Science and Technology (DOST), the Philippine Army (PA), and the Mechatronics and Robotics Society of the Philippines (MRSP) to financially support the development and eventual production of a remote controlled weapon station (RCWS). The partnership was significant as prior procurement and defense industry laws limited the manner in which the government could support and collaborate with local defense companies. (Note: A report released by the Philippine Navy's Office of Naval Strategic Studies and Strategy Management in 2024 cited funding, bureaucratic and perceptions of foreign-made military hardware as superior as the reasons why the government had limited support from private companies in the defense industry.)

Product development was initiated by the Metal Industry Research and Development Center under the Department of Science and Technology as part of the Armed Forces of the Philippines' Self-Reliant Defense Posture (SRDP) program, established under the SRDP Revitalization Act.

The DOST and PA provided funds for research and development into COBRA with the former providing PHP 24,286,705.60 from 2023 to 2024 while the latter provided PHP 5,000,000 for 2024 with a total of PHP 29,286,705.60. (Note: Reported to be USD$495,000.) The agreement was based on the success of Project BUHAWI (Building a Universal Mount for Heavy-Barrel Automated Weapon), which had automated gun mounts developed for .50 caliber machine guns, turned over in 2022 to the Philippine Navy.

On December 11, 2025, the system was publicly unveiled with a live fire drill at Camp O'Donnell in Capas, Tarlac with the participation of the Armor "Pambato" Division. The system was turned over to the PA after the end of the drills. Among the guests present to watch the drills included Philippine Defense Secretary Gilbert Teodoro. Reportedly, five companies had already submitted letters of intent indicating their interest in manufacturing the system. Estimated costs were project at around PHP8 million to PHP10 million per unit for an order of 20 units. It was reported that 20 COBRAs are planned to be adopted.

Jose Antonio Goitia, chairman emeritus of four civic oriented groups that include Filipinos Do Not Yield (FDNY) Movement, stated that the creation of COBRA would allow the country to design, develop and maintain its own assets. The DOST hopes that the COBRA would lead to job creation in the local defense industry, foreign exchange savings, and potential export of military hardware.

Arnaud Leveau of Paris Dauphine University warned that self-reliance should be done beyond prototypes and demos and said without "predictable procurement and long-term sustainment planning, even well-designed local systems risk remaining more symbolic than transformative."

== Development ==
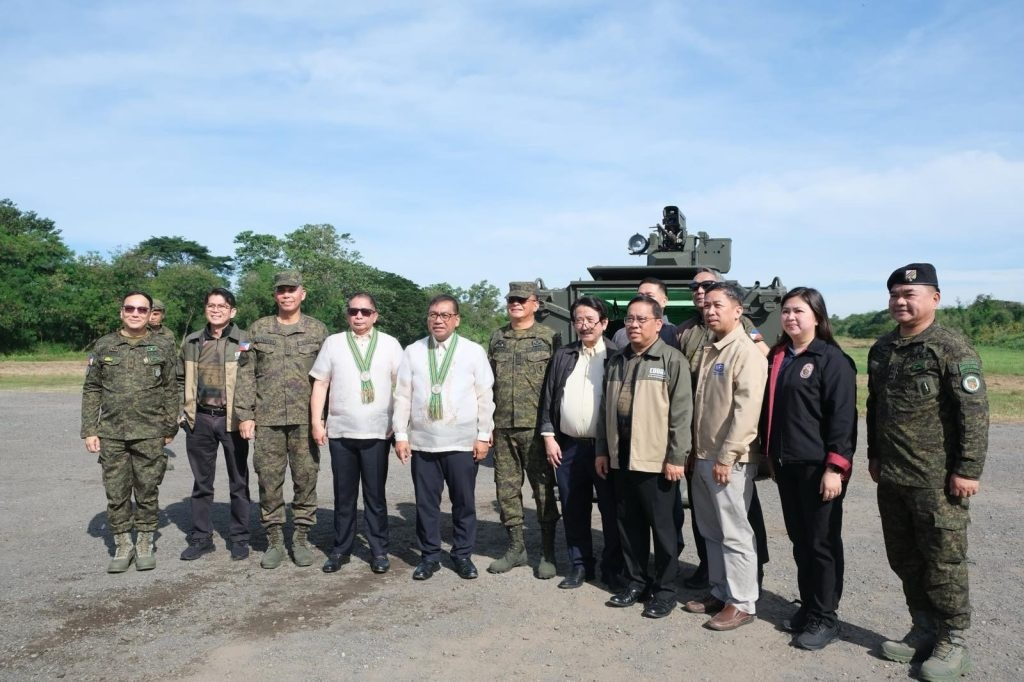
The Project COBRA team pose with in the photo after the success of the live fire drills with DND Undersecretary Rene Diaz (fourth from left), DOST Secretary Renato Solidum Jr. (fifth from left) and General Antonio Nafarrete (sixth from left) with other DND officials and MRSP members.

COBRA was made to support the installation and use of a .50 BMG–based heavy machine gun (HMG). COBRA can be used with a 360 degree direction with tracking at a rate of 30 kilometers/hour. Tamayo stated that the COBRA was tested in various field conditions prior to the live drill at Camp O' Donnell.

It can be used remotely from vehicles and structures, allowing users to fire them safely without being under enemy fire. A controller is used to control the COBRA and the weapons mounted on it.

The system features a remote-operated and stabilized weapon mount, an integrated day/night/thermal camera, a laser range finder and a ballistic computer.

According to DOST–MIRDC Prototyping Division Chief and Project Leader Engineer Rodnel Tamayo, most of COBRA's components were made from locally made parts. Domestic manufacturers are expected to be involved due to using local parts in manufacturing the COBRA.

Commanding General of the Philippine Army Antonio Nafarrete stated that the COBRA can be used to support the Comprehensive Archipelagic Defense Concept (CADC). (Note: The CADC is a doctrine launched in January 2024, which is the need to "project military power to deter unwanted incursions or unlawful activities across the Philippine archipelago, including ensuring the nation benefits from natural resources within its internationally recognized exclusive economic zone (EEZ).")
