= Kobra (ride) =

Zamperla Mega Disk'O Coaster

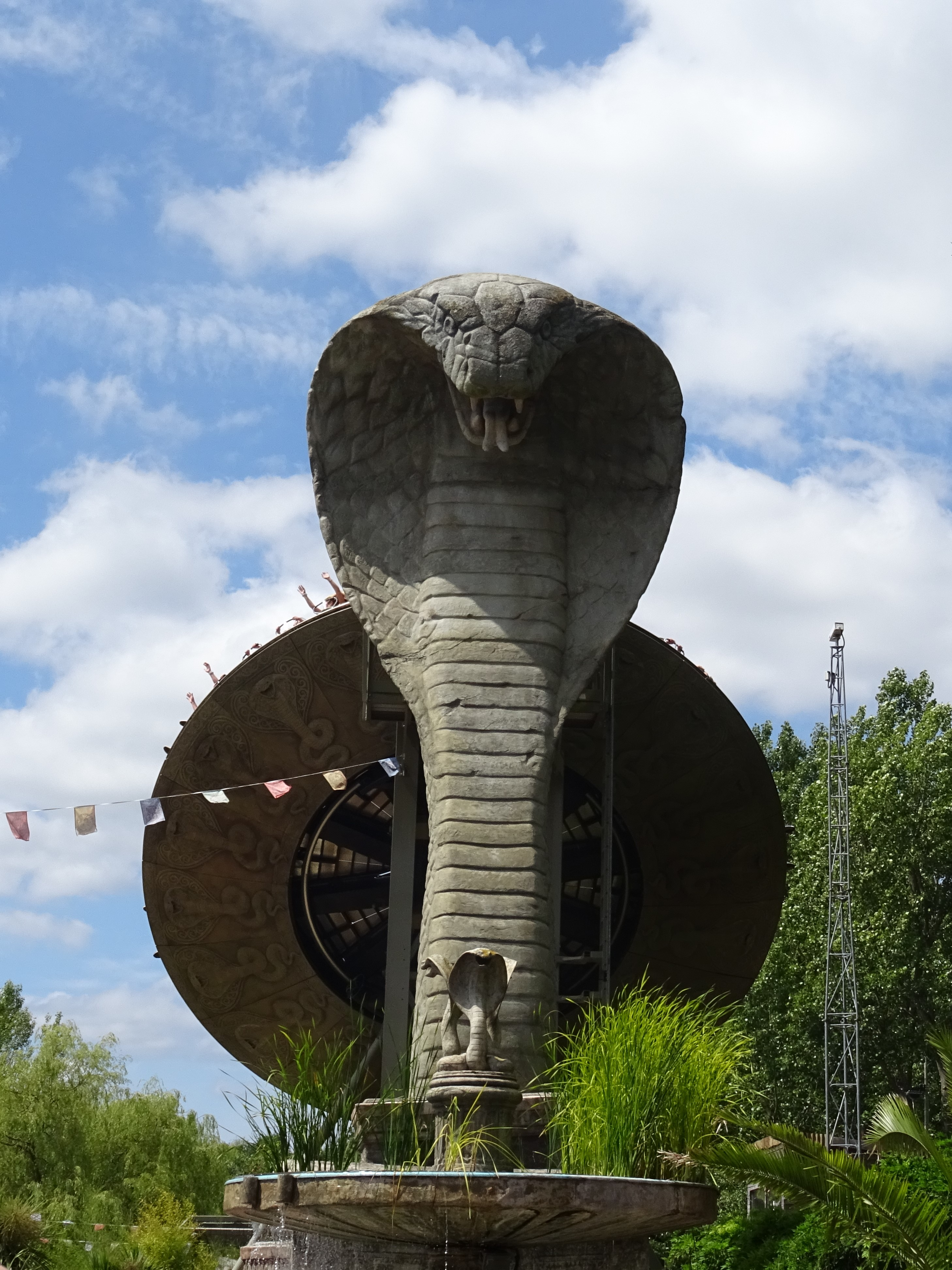

Chessington World of Adventures
- Area: Wild Asia
- Coordinates: 51.347962°N 0.320573°W
- Status: Closed
- Cost: £1,000,000
- Opening date: 2010

Ride statistics
- Manufacturer: Zamperla
- Model: Mega Disk'O Coaster
- Height: 51 ft (16 m)
- Length: 90 m (300 ft)
- Speed: 43 mph (69 km/h)
- Capacity: 490 riders per hour
- Reserve and Ride available
- Wheelchair accessible
- Must transfer from wheelchair

Kobra (stylised as KOBRA) is a Zamperla Mega Disk’O Coaster which opened in 2010 at Chessington World of Adventures Resort in southwest London, England. The ride is currently closed for relocation and rebranding as part of its integration into the newly developed Minecraft-themed land for the 2027 season. As a result of the reimagining, it is unlikely that the attraction will retain its original name, Kobra.

== History ==
Kobra opened in the 2010 season in the new Wild Asia land at Chessington World of Adventures Resort. It was manufactured by Zamperla. It is only the second model of its type in Britain, after The Edge at Paulton's Park.

In early 2025, it was announced that the ride would remain closed throughout the 2025 season to facilitate its dismantling, relocation, and re-theming. The attraction is set to be incorporated into the upcoming Minecraft-themed land, which is scheduled to open for the 2027 season.

== Description ==
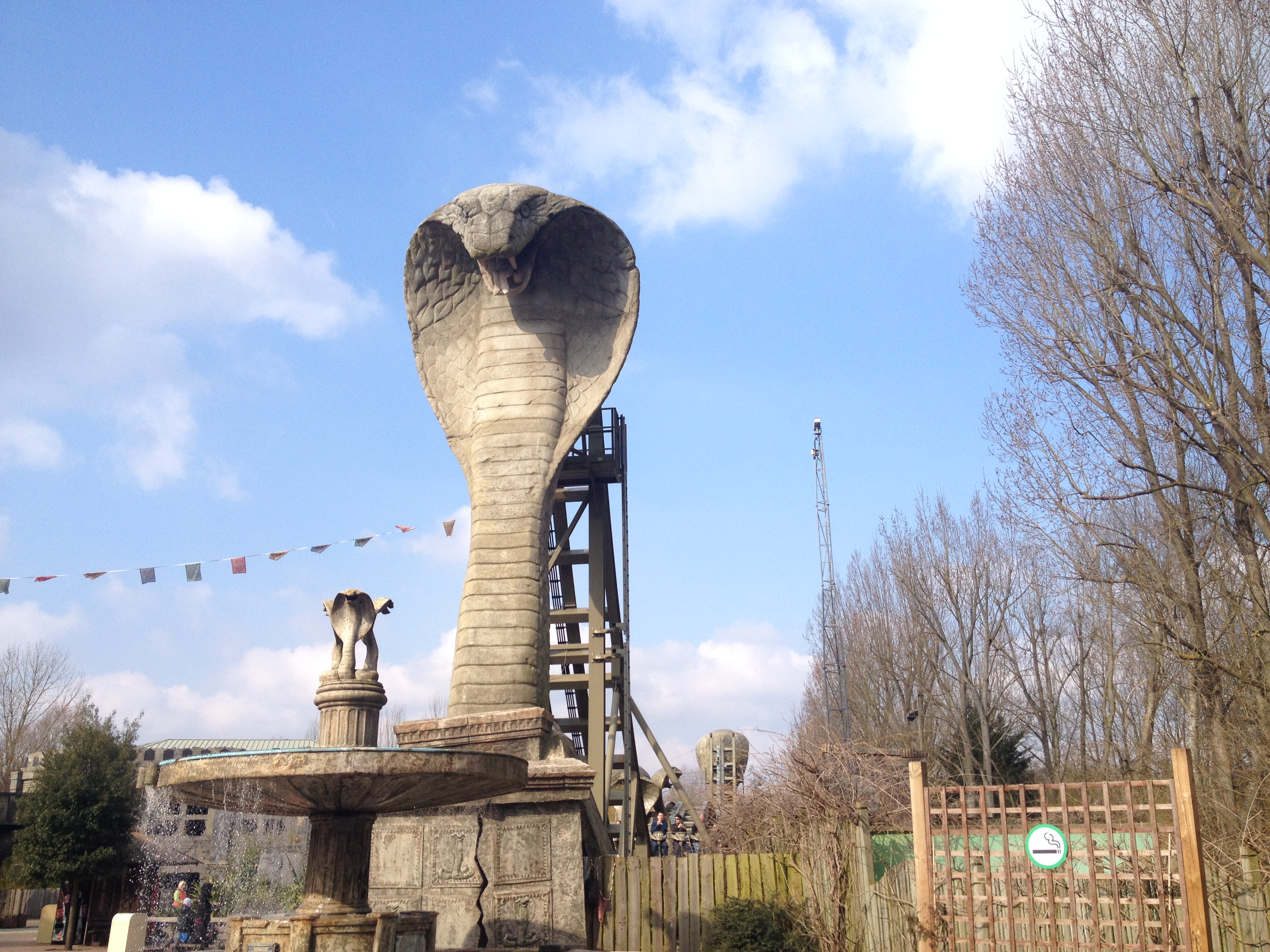
Snake theming.

As with other rides of its type, riders straddle a seat in a motorcycle-like position, with outward-facing seats positioned along the edge of the circular ride platform.

The platform begins to spin on its axis as it swings back and forth along the track, gradually building enough momentum to clear the camelback hump. The ride then completes a pendulum-like motion, traveling back and forth over the hump and ascending and descending the steep slopes at either end of the track.

Kobra featured two prominent theming elements: a large snake statue positioned at either end of the attraction’s track, complementing the ride's namesake and overall design.

The minimum height requirement is 1.20 meters, with a torso measurement of up to 51 inches.

== Gallery ==
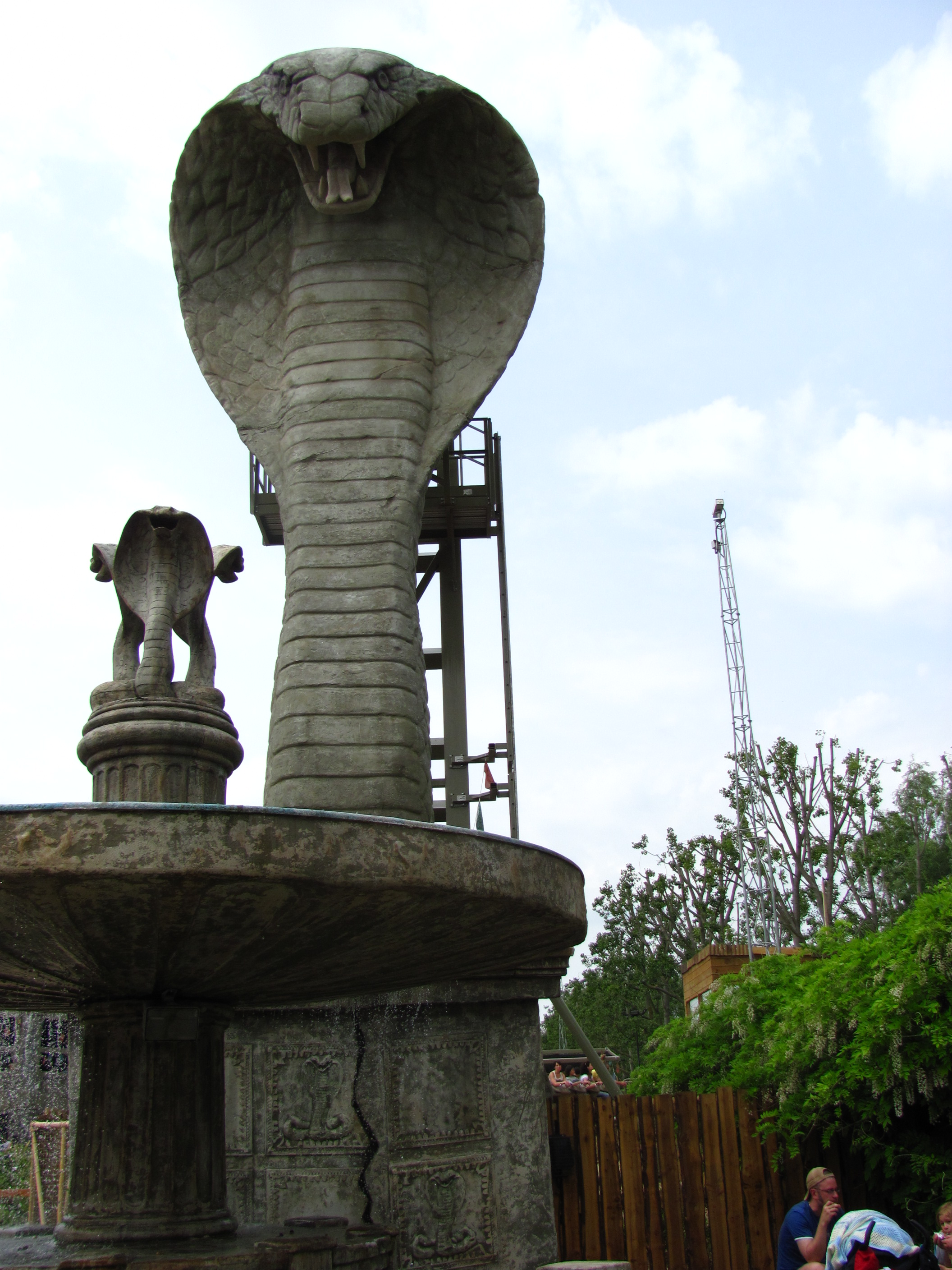
Snake statue

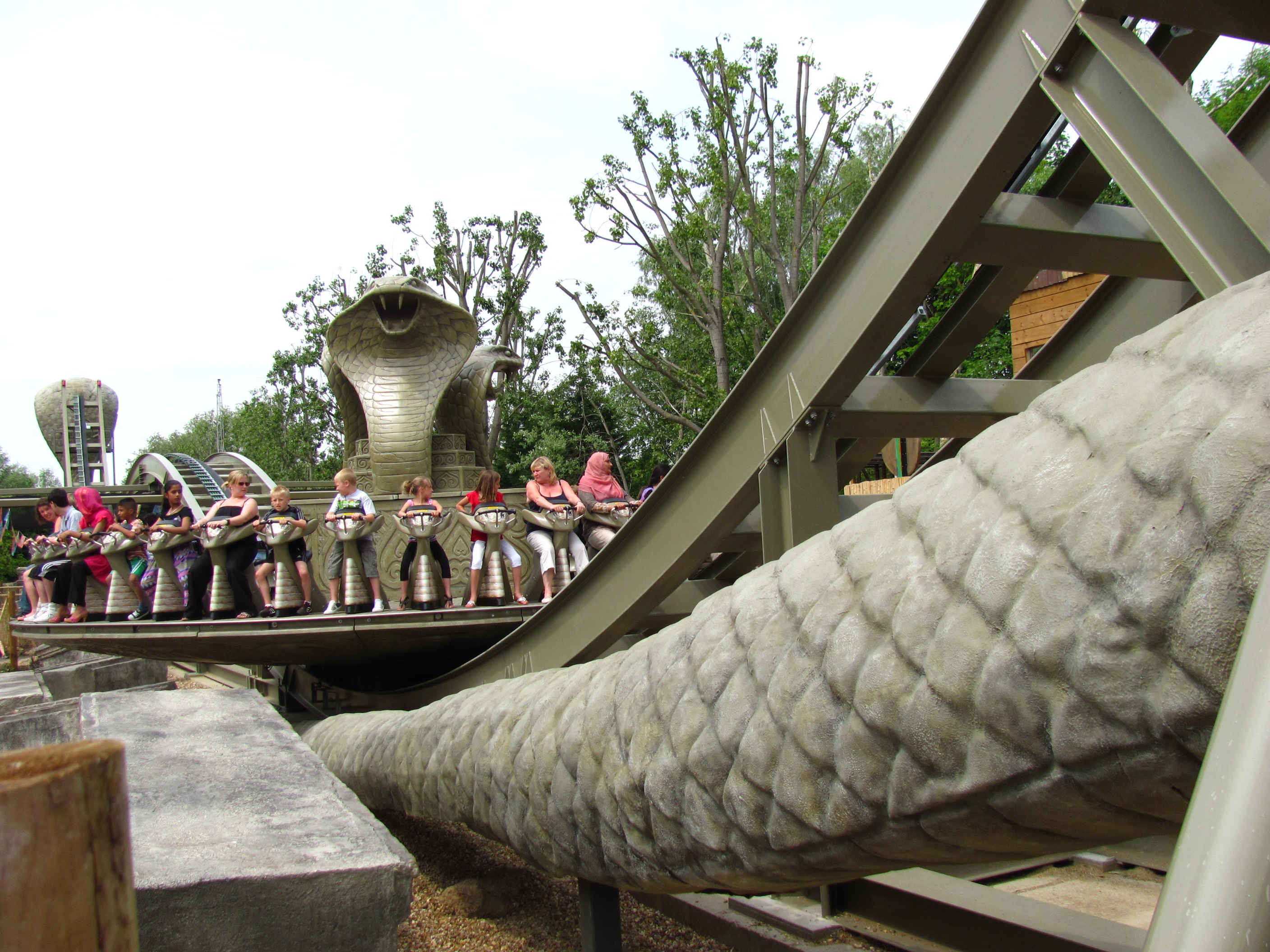
Loading position

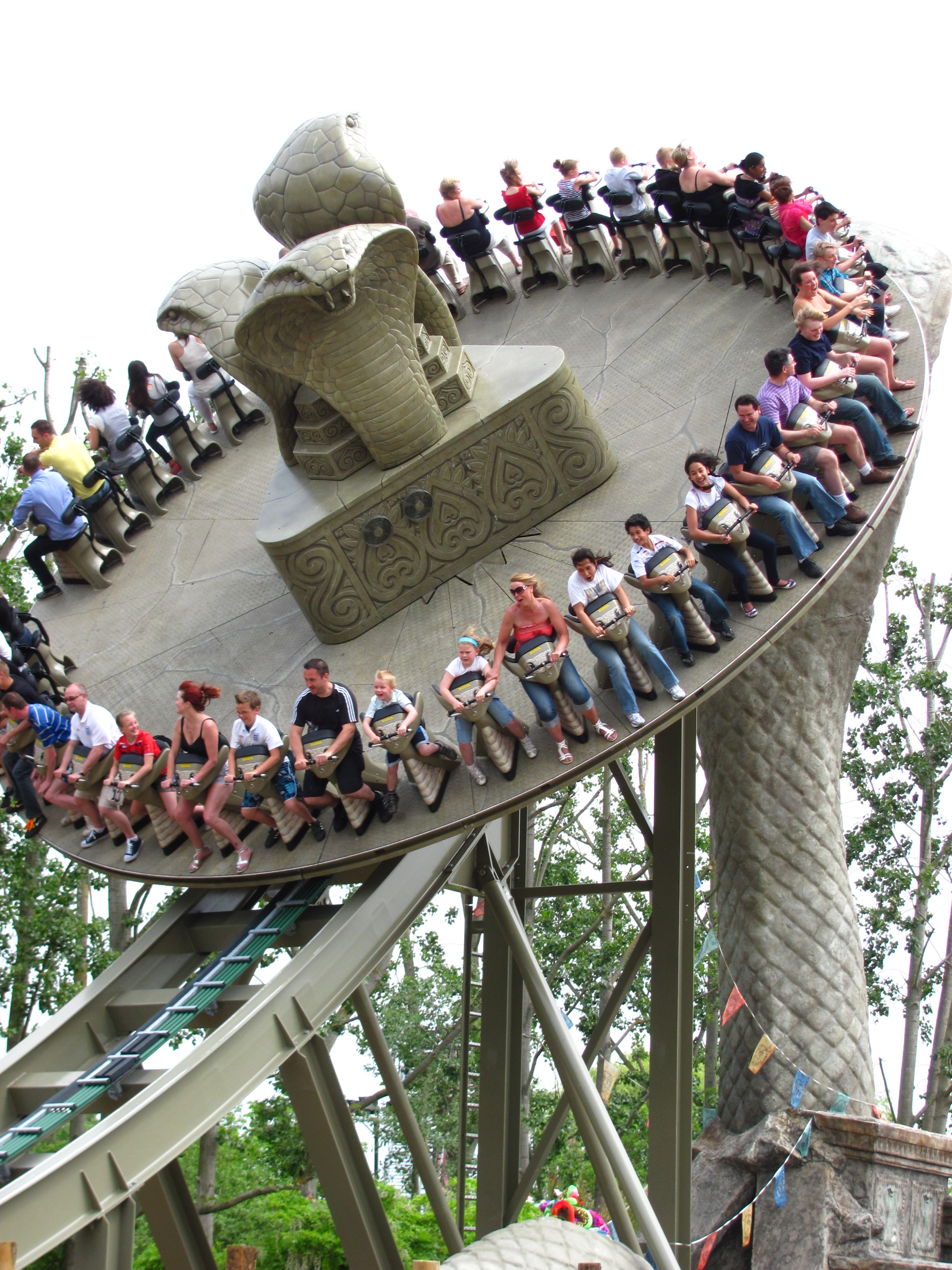
Ride in its opening year

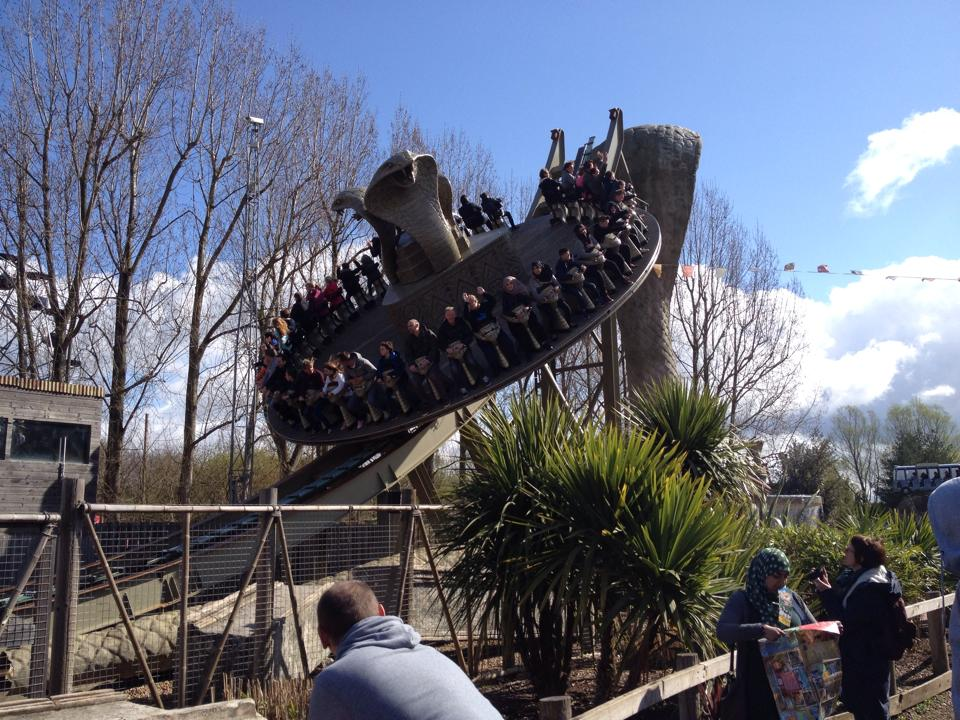
Ride in 2015

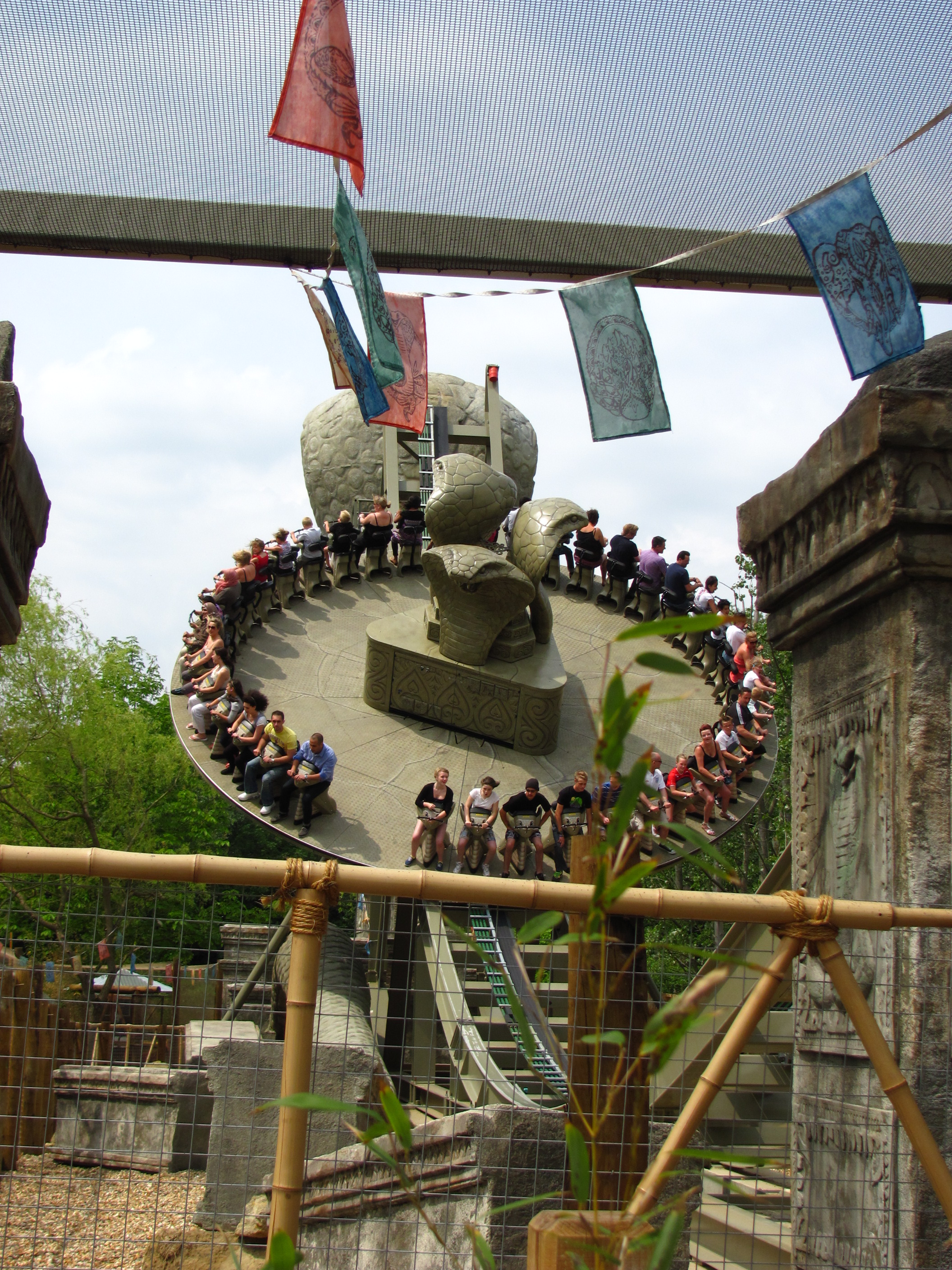
