= Dragon Slayer (roller coaster) =

Roller coaster at Adventureland

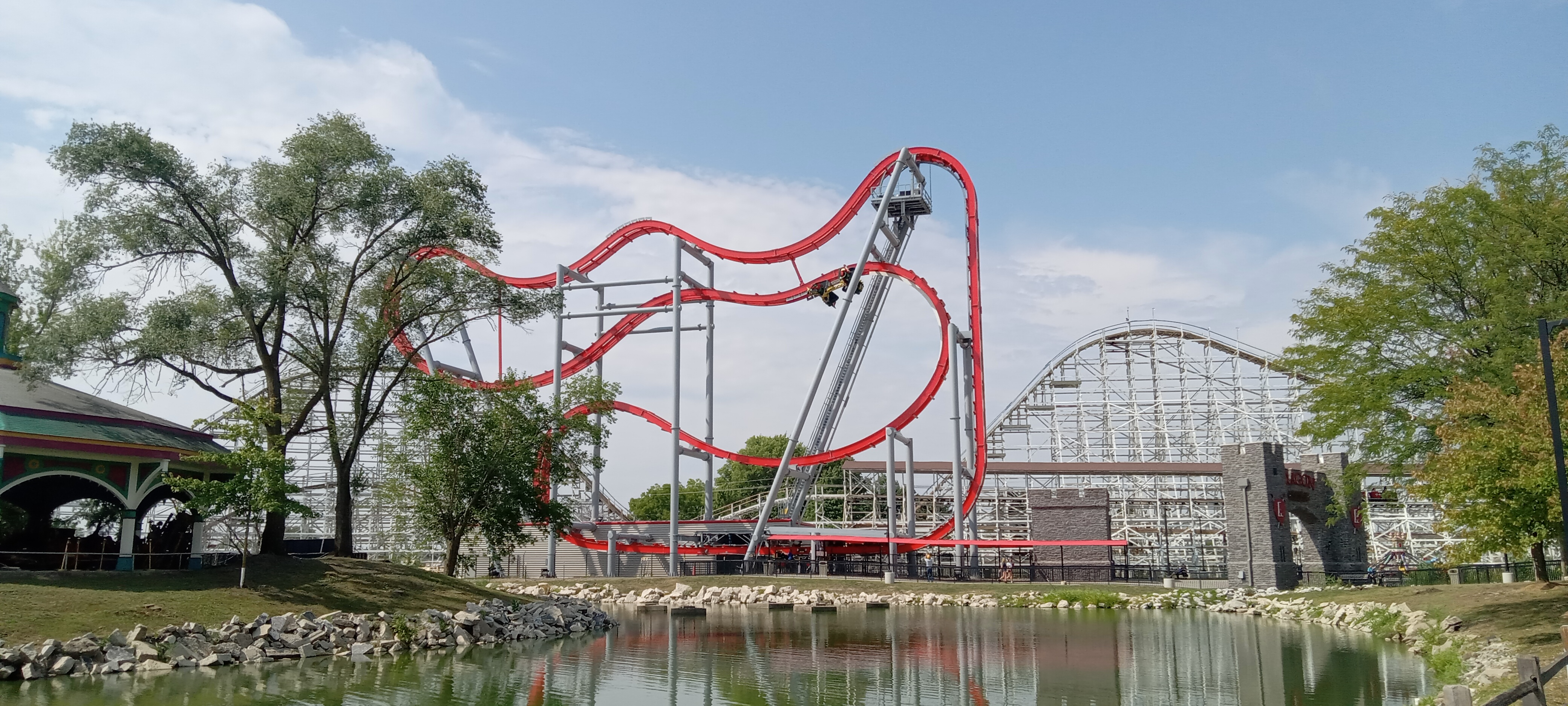

Adventureland (Iowa)
- Location: Adventureland (Iowa)
- Park section: Dragon Island
- Coordinates: 41.651047°N 93.502374°W
- Status: Operating
- Opening date: May 29, 2021; 5 years ago
- Cost: $7,000,000
- Replaced: Dragon

General statistics
- Type: Steel – 4th Dimension – Wing Coaster
- Manufacturer: S&S – Sansei Technologies
- Designer: Alan Schilke
- Model: 4D Free Spin
- Lift/launch system: Chain lift hill
- Height: 112 ft (34 m)
- Length: 770 ft (230 m)
- Speed: 34 mph (55 km/h)
- Height restriction: 48 in (122 cm)
- Trains: 2 cars. Riders are arranged 4 across in a single row for a total of 8 riders per train.
- Dragon Slayer at RCDB

Dragon Slayer is a 4D Free Spin roller coaster at Adventureland in Altoona, Iowa. The coaster was built as a replacement for the Dragon looping coaster, which opened in 1990 and was mostly dismantled during the first half of 2020. Dragon Slayer began public operations on May 29, 2021.

== History ==
On May 17, 2020, Adventureland began teasing a new attraction for the 2021 season, posting the initial teaser on their Facebook page of a knight slaying a dragon, leading to immediate rumors that the park's iconic Dragon looping coaster would be removed, and that a replacement attraction was on the way. The next day, construction crews began the process of dismantling the Dragon, which had grown old and was in a steadily deteriorating shape to the point that it had become extremely uncomfortable to ride. All of the ride except the coaster's two signature vertical loops were taken down; these will be left standing as a monument for the time being. Two days later, the park posted a second teaser, a rotating GIF confirming the new unknown ride, and text revealing the name of the attraction; Dragon Slayer. A month later, after arriving track parts and hardware were identified by roller coaster enthusiasts, Dragon Slayer was confirmed by the park to be an S&S Sansei Freespin roller coaster, in line with the suspicions of many. The ride would be located on the plot of land next to the park's Tornado wooden coaster, which was formerly occupied by Dragon's double helix finale.

Dragon Slayer was constructed during the fall of 2020, with foundations being poured during August and September, and the ride beginning vertical construction in early October. Construction of the track and supports was finished by early November 2020, and the ride's first test run took place on March 23, 2021. Dragon Slayer opened to the public on May 29, 2021.

== Characteristics ==
=== Ride ===
Dragon Slayer is a 4th Dimension coaster, where riders sit in horizontally spinning cars on either side of the track and freely flip throughout the ride. This unique seating arrangement allows for the coaster track to make vertical hairpin turns that would otherwise be impossible on the average ride, yet due to this, the ride queue will split up into half just before the loading platform in order to direct passengers to either side of the track. The actual layout is quite simple; after a brief vertical lift hill, the coaster descends into a mostly downhill track course of flip-inducing hills and raven turns. Each side of Dragon Slayer's train is nicknamed Knight and Squire; the Knight side offers a more thrilling ride and uncontrolled spinning experience while the Squire side offers a milder ride.

=== Colors ===
Dragon Slayer has vibrant red track and a light gray support structure, and the trains sport a bright yellow-green-red scheme, thus ensuring a vibrant standout within the park.

=== Model and similar attractions ===
Dragon Slayer is manufactured by Utah-based S&S – Sansei Technologies, and belongs to the esteemed model line of 4-D Free Spins, which began production around 2013 or so. The first of these coasters, Batman: The Ride, opened for the 2015 season at Six Flags Fiesta Texas in San Antonio, Texas; since then, several more have been installed at various parks. Unlike the pre-existing variants of Freespins, Dragon Slayer has a customized layout, and is smaller in size compared to the original variant.
