= Dragon (Adventureland) =

Former roller coaster at Adventureland

The Dragon
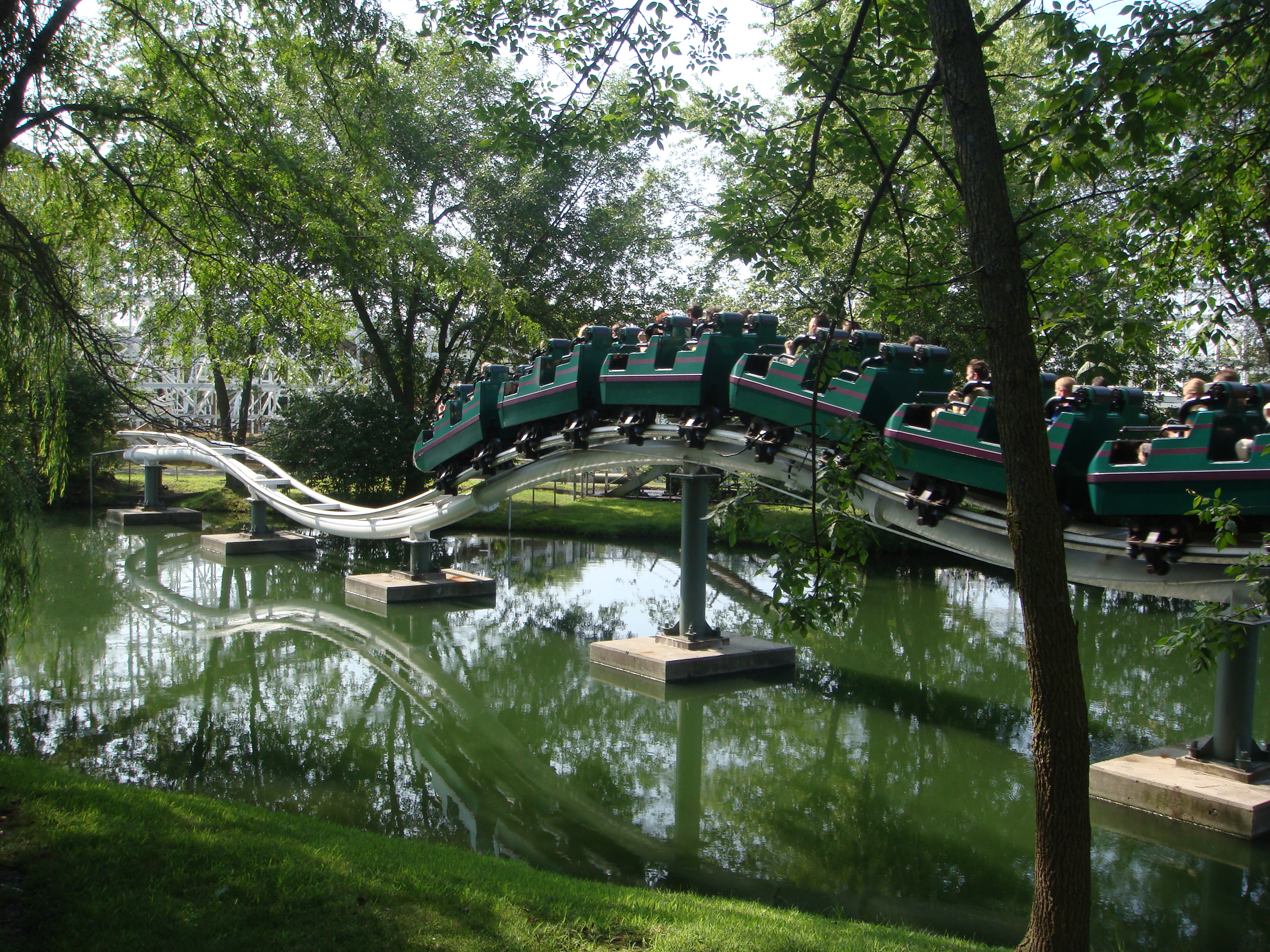
- The ride as it appeared in 2017

Adventureland (Iowa)
- Location: Adventureland (Iowa)
- Park section: Dragon Island
- Coordinates: 41°39′1.46″N 93°30′5.00″W
- Status: Removed
- Opening date: May 12, 1990
- Closing date: September 29, 2019
- Cost: $2.1 Million
- Replaced by: Dragon Slayer

General statistics
- Type: Steel
- Manufacturer: Hopkins Rides
- Model: Looping coaster
- Track layout: Out and Back
- Lift/launch system: Chain Lift Hill
- Height: 90 ft (27 m)
- Drop: 85 ft (26 m)
- Length: 2,620 ft (800 m)
- Speed: 55 mph (89 km/h)
- Inversions: 2
- Duration: 2 minutes
- Max vertical angle: 45°
- Capacity: 800 riders per hour
- Acceleration: 4
- G-force: 4.5
- Height restriction: 42 in (107 cm)
- Trains: Single train with 7 cars. Riders are arranged 2 across in 2 rows for a total of 28 riders per train.
- The Dragon at RCDB

The Dragon was an O.D. Hopkins steel roller coaster located at Adventureland in Altoona, Iowa. The coaster opened for Adventureland's sixteenth season of operation on May 12, 1990, and was partially dismantled during the spring/summer of 2020 to make way for the Dragon Slayer 4D Freespin.

== History ==
Construction on the Dragon had begun on an unoccupied plot of land and lake area as early as December 1989, although it isn't known when the ride was officially announced. The coaster's station was located on land formerly occupied by the recently installed Convoy ride, which was relocated to its current location in the park. In a move to match the Dragon's theme, the Riverview area of the park that the ride was built around was rechristened as Dragon Island.

The Dragon made its debut on May 12, 1990, representing an estimated $2.1 - 2.5 million investment (worth $4–5 million in 2020). It was Adventureland's only coaster with inversions until The Monster opened in June 2016. While the coaster was fairly well-received by the public for several years, it would eventually begin to roughen up and gain a reputation for its shakiness and poor tracking. The outdated hardware and design would only be amplified by the installation of the more modern Monster in 2016. Overall, Dragon's condition had greatly deteriorated by the summer of 2019, which would end up becoming its last season of operation. The last remaining section of the ride was completely removed by 2022

On May 17, 2020, Adventureland began teasing a new attraction for the 2021 season named The Dragon Slayer, which was later revealed to be a replacement for the Dragon. The very next day, construction crews began the process of dismantling the Dragon, now confirmed to be permanently closed. Only the ride's defining pair of vertical loops were left standing as decoration, and were fitted with banners teasing the new Dragon Slayer coaster.

== Layout ==
The train traverses a few bunny hops and a 90-degree right turn as it coasts from the station to the lift. Cresting the lift, it makes a small dip, a roughly 90-degree turn to the right, and drop down and into the two back-to-back vertical loops. Following the loops is a right turn into a double helix segment and then enters the brake run, leading back to the station.

== Trains ==
The Dragon originally opened with a single 7-car train, each car of which had two rows of two, and thus held four riders for a total of 28 riders per train. In 2000, one of the cars was removed for an unknown reason and another in 2019, leaving just five of the original 7 car train operational during its last season of operation. The coaster operated with rigid over-the-shoulder restraints, which made the ride unbearably uncomfortable for many near the end of its lifetime.

== Incidents ==
- On June 8, 1991, the chain lift hill snapped while pulling up a train, and careened into the front car, injuring four riders. Despite the lift chains complete give out, the train was stopped from rolling back by the various anti-rollback dogs placed throughout the lift hill. A later investigation revealed that the coaster had been operating with a supplementary chain from Sandusky, Ohio-based Union Chain, which was smaller and weaker than the yet-to-arrive intended one.
- On August 5, 2018, an employee was performing maintenance on the coaster when a co-worker accidentally released the train. The incident caused a laceration and broke the employee's arm. An investigation indicted the park of 7 safety violations on the Dragon, 5 of which were serious, including the lack of a proper energy control system in place to render the train unable to move or operate when necessary. Adventureland was subsequently fined $37,181 by the Occupational Safety and Health Administration as a result.
