= Underground (roller coaster) =

Wooden roller coaster

Adventureland (Iowa)
- Location: Adventureland (Iowa)
- Park section: Last Frontier
- Coordinates: 41.651822°N 93.500515°W
- Status: Operating
- Opening date: April 27, 1996

General statistics
- Type: Wood
- Manufacturer: Custom Coasters International
- Designer: Custom Coasters, Inc., Larry Bill, Dennis McNulty
- Model: Indoor Freeform
- Lift/launch system: Chain-lift
- Height: 13 ft (4.0 m)
- Length: 911 ft (278 m)
- Inversions: 0
- Duration: 2 minutes
- Height restriction: 42 in (107 cm)
- Underground at RCDB

Underground is a wooden roller coaster manufactured by Custom Coasters International and located at Adventureland in Altoona, Iowa. The ride is situated next to the Frantic Freeway attraction. Unlike traditional roller coasters, Underground features two small lift hills but does not include major drops. While utilizing a roller coaster track system, the ride is primarily designed as a dark ride. The official ride description states: "Tour the old mine and try to solve the mystery of Bad Bob." Each train consists of seven cars, with riders seated two across in two rows, accommodating up to 28 riders per train.

The ride was closed for the 2023 season for a major refurbishment, where it received a complete rebuild of the coaster trains by Philadelphia Toboggan Coasters and updated show scenes designed by the haunted attraction specialists at Gaff Box. Underground is the only fully enclosed wooden roller coaster.

It reopened on May 18, 2024, with a special ceremony featuring an actor portraying Sheriff Sam using a dynamite plunger box to "blast open" the mine. A limited-edition "Daily Adventure" newspaper was distributed to riders on opening day, presenting fictional stories related to the ride's storyline. The refurbishment also introduced a new entry portal with an updated Underground logo. Additionally, the queue area now includes television screens displaying themed videos of wanted posters featuring Sheriff Sam and Bad Bob. As part of the rebranding effort, the park officially removed "The" from the ride's name.

== Summary ==
Underground is themed as an old Iowa coal mine. Entering the attraction's preshow, an animatronic miner explains that Adventureland was built on top of the coal mine and was used as a hideout by outlaws and bank robbers. When Sheriff Sam, owner of the park's saloon, had heard the robber Bad Bob was using it as a hideout after a large gold heist, he destroyed every known entrance with dynamite to trap Bad Bob inside. However, the mine has become plagued with unusual accidents since its reopening as a result of sabotage from the vengeful spirit of Bad Bob haunting the tunnels, who appears in a mist projection in the 2024 version declaring that nobody will get his gold.

Original Version (1996–2022)

As the trains travel through the mine, they pass by various miners at work from pickaxe duty to a tunnel clearing project where a pack mule is acting stubborn with their handler before entering through a collapsing tunnel. Passing a cliff, you can see someone hanging onto the side of the cliff with a chest of gold nearby. The train goes up the first lift hill with a bright light and sound of a train horn at the top of the hill. The train then goes past a miner peeking through a hole in the wall before going into the darkness and encountering the skeletal ghost of Bad Bob (Accompanied by the opening sting of the title theme of The Good, the Bad, and the Ugly). Moving past a waterfall, the train goes up a second lift hill through a collapsing tunnel and pass a Pepper's ghost illusion of Bad Bob's ghost phasing between a skeletal and mortal form. Going down the tunnel, the train finally passes by Bad Bob's skeletal remains sitting atop a pile of gold and holding a stick of dynamite laughing before the train winds down through the tunnel with falling timbers, the sound of explosions, back to the load station.

Reimagined Version (2024–Present)

As the trains travel through the mine, they pass by various miners at work from pickaxe duty to a tunnel clearing project where a pack mule is acting stubborn with their handler before entering through a collapsing tunnel. Passing a cliff, you can see an outlaw wielding a large knife and a man hanging onto part of a rope bridge that the outlaw had cut. The train goes up the first lift hill before entering a hyperlight tunnel. The train then goes past a miner peeking through a hole in the wall before going into the darkness and encountering a mine cart coming right at the riders with a loud horn. Moving past a large talking skull, the train goes up a second lift hill through a collapsing tunnel and passes an animatronic of Bad Bob lunging out at riders firing a gun with bursts of air shot at the riders to feel like bullets whizzing by them. Going down another hyperlight tunnel, the train finally passes by Bad Bob's skeletal remains sitting atop a pile of gold and holding a plunger box laughing before plunging the box, igniting an explosion as the train winds down through the tunnel with falling timbers back to the load station.
