= Adventureland (Iowa) =

Amusement park in Iowa, USA

- Current Adventureland Park logo.
- Interactive map of Adventureland
- Location: Adventureland Resort, Altoona, Iowa, United States
- Coordinates: 41.654447°N 93.499886°W
- Status: Operating
- Opened: August 1974; 52 years ago
- Owner: Herschend
- General manager: Mike Lusky
- Theme: Iowa past
- Slogan: Home of Iowa's Best Thrills
- Operating season: May through October, Daily mid-May through mid-August then weekends until the last Sunday of October.
- Area: 180 acres (73 ha)

Attractions
- Total: 50 (including water park attractions)
- Roller coasters: 7
- Water rides: 24
- Website: www.adventurelandresort.com

Adventureland Resort (often referred to as Adventureland for short) is a theme park in Altoona, Iowa (just northeast of Des Moines). It is marketed as the Home of Iowa's Best Thrills.

== History ==
Adventureland's history was conceived as early as 1970, when Des Moines businessman Jack Krantz had an idea to bring a Disneyland-style theme park to Iowa. He was inspired after taking his family to Anaheim, California years prior. The Des Moines homebuilder claimed that his inspiration came after spotting a large fiberglass pig on the side of the road near Manly, Iowa. His initial idea was for his children to sell snacks out of the pig-shaped stand during the summer, but the concept quickly expanded into something much grander. He ended up having a pig-shaped food stand added to the park, naming it Petunia.

Krantz organized business leaders from across Iowa to establish Adventure Lands of America, Inc. and draw up plans to build a major attraction. "We hope to attract people nationwide. We investigated the recreational facilities across the country and decided to build one here in Iowa. We hope it will be a big boost to the state. It will definitely be in the class of Disneyland and Six Flags Over Texas," Krantz said in 1971.

=== Jack Krantz & Adventure Lands of America, Inc. era (1971–2021) ===
In April 1971, Krantz announced his plans for a 160-acre educational-recreational facility he called Adventure Land. The estimated cost of the planned resort complex was projects as $10 million (approx. $78.5 million in 2025). The plan was for more than just a theme park; it would also include a motor lodge, convention center, and campground. Krantz said that it would be "in the class of Disneyland and Six Flags Over Texas."

Original plans for the theme park included four sections. One was a Main Street section modeled after New England-style buildings with different shops. The adventure section would contain attractions such as a simulated trip to Iowa coal mines, a pirate ship, and jungle trips. Another section was to be devoted to kids with animated Mother Goose figures, and the fourth section was to feature Iowa manufacturers and their products as well as the manufacturers' progress from 1900 to modern times.

Construction of Adventureland Park began in 1973 on a site formerly occupied by a small airport in Des Moines, active in the 1920s until a larger municipal airport was built in 1933 at a different location. The area was later used for farming until Adventureland's construction broke ground. Its grand opening was scheduled for July 1974, but the park suffered light damage from a tornado, delaying the opening until late August.

The first full season began in 1975, and several rides were added that year. A wooden roller coaster called Tornado was added in 1978, named after the tornado that delayed the park's grand opening.

In 2002, Adventureland undertook an 8 million dollar project that nearly doubled the size of the hotel, adding a second courtyard, new pools with interactive water features and new poolside rooms and suites. It also added a new water ride in the park, a spinning white water adventure, called Saw Mill Splash. The ride is themed around an old saw mill and fits into the western motif of Adventureland's Outlaw Gulch area.

In 2006, Adventureland added two more rides, The Splash Over and Frog Hopper. Later that year in October, founder Jack Krantz died, and his sons and daughters took over the operations.

On February 20, 2010 (about 4:00 p.m.), a fire broke out in the toy store of main street after its roof collapsed due to the weight of ice and snow. The collapse caused an electrical fire. The fire went out of control and engulfed the corner portion of Main Street and destroyed the section that encompassed the bingo parlor, restaurant, toy store, games area and arcade. The fire was brought under control about an hour later and was completely extinguished an hour thereafter. None of the adjacent structures or rides were harmed and no one was injured. The buildings were destroyed so quickly because, due to their age, sprinklers were not required to be installed. The park opened as planned on April 24, 2010, with the east side of Main Street completely cleared to dirt surrounded by a chain link fence. Banners on the fence stated that "Plans are well underway to build Main Street back better than ever."

All of Main Street was rebuilt when the park opened in April 2011 and featured an even larger arcade with an indoor ride, and a smaller BINGO hall. The park's Scrambler ride, previously known as the Wrangler, was brought out of storage and moved to the G-Force's location after the G-Force was moved into the Main Street arcade. On December 15, 2011 (about 3:45 a.m.), another fire broke out, this time destroying the Rally Round corn dog stand. Crews said the fire had engulfed the structure when they arrived but they were able to put it out quickly. According to fire officials, an electrical transformer behind the corn dog stand was the cause. A larger food location would be built in its place.

On September 6, 2013, Adventureland posted on their official Facebook page that a new attraction called Storm Chaser would be added. A 3D rendering of the ride was posted on the page, as well as an interview with park officials, showed that the new ride is a Mondial WindSeeker model. Park officials also stated that it would be replacing the aging Silly Silo due to that ride's frequent down time and the company no longer making parts to fix it.

On July 8, 2015, Adventureland announced that they were adding a new roller coaster called The Monster, a Gerstlauer Infinity coaster and the first of its kind in the United States. It opened to the public on June 4, 2016, after park employee previews a few days earlier. It replaced the River Rapids log ride, which ran since the park first opened. The Monster features a unique nighttime LED light display made up of 137 track mounted fixtures that synchronize to the ride vehicles, and 46 ground lights. The Monster lighting system originator and designer, Mike Lambert, was recognized with (2) Illuminating Engineering Society (IES) Illumination Awards for Innovation in Design.

On September 20, 2017, Adventureland announced a new children's area called Bernie's Barnyard. It opened on July 20, 2018, with two family rides, a playground and kiddie arcade games. It replaced the Country Picnic area just behind the Storm Chaser.

On December 11, 2018, Adventureland announced on its Facebook page that it would be adding Phoenix, a $6 million spinning coaster from Maurer Rides. It opened on July 4, 2019, replacing the Inverter. It is the park's sixth roller coaster and the second-largest investment on a ride in the park's history, only behind Monster.

Logo briefly used after the 2021 season, before being sold to Palace Entertainment. A new logo was created before the park opened for the 2022 season.

On May 17, 2020, Adventureland teased a picture of a knight slaying a dragon (reference to the park's 1990 O.D. Hopkins double looping rollercoaster, the Dragon). The same day, crews were spotted dismantling the Dragon and a new teaser was posted with the title "The Dragon Slayer." The coaster opened on May 29, 2021. The Splash Over was also removed in 2020 and replaced by a stage.

On September 8, 2021, Adventureland announced their plans to remove the Lighthouse, Lady Luck and Falling Star. In addition, Adventureland also announced 10 new attractions that will be coming next year including a Renaissance Fair. However, the plans to host the Renaissance Fair were later scrapped.

=== Palace Entertainment era (2021–2025) ===
On December 21, 2021, it was announced that Palace Entertainment had acquired Adventureland.

Adventureland opened for the 2022 season on Saturday, May 14, with a ribbon cutting ceremony celebrating Palace Entertainment's new ownership of the park and the addition of nine new attractions. On June 20, 2022, Adventureland announced that it was expanding its season with the addition of Phantom Fall Fest later that year. The Halloween event would feature seven haunted attractions, including four haunted mazes and three scare zones. The mAlice in Wonderland haunted maze would be an upcharge for the 2022 season.

On August 9, 2022, Adventureland General Manager Bill Lentz announced during a press conference inside the park that two new Viking-themed rides would be coming for the 2023 season, called Flying Viking and Draken Falls. A ceremonial ground-breaking was held after the press conference. Adventureland unveiled the boats for Draken Falls with Zamperla during a press conference on the IAAPA Expo trade show floor on November 15, 2022. The rides both opened on Saturday, June 24, 2023 with a ribbon cutting ceremony with the park's new general manager, Mike Lusky, and mascot Bernie Bernard cutting the ribbon with a sword.

Adventureland's 50th-anniversary celebration kicked off on May 18, 2024, with a grand opening ceremony featuring Adventureland General Manager Mike Lusky and Iowa Lt. Governor Adam Gregg. It was held on the steps of the train station, in the same way Adventureland's grand opening was done in May 1975. Throughout the season, the park offered a variety of historical tributes, including throwback photos and a 50 Years Exhibit, which displayed the original Silly Silo sign. Additionally, Adventureland honored its past by repainting Petunia Pig gold, recognizing its role in inspiring Jack Krantz to build the park. The Falling Star Lounge was added with the lighted sign from the former ride added to the exterior of the lounge space and oversized black-and-white images of historic rides on the walls. Other highlights included the Festival of Decades, featuring different tribute bands and limited edition coins for each decade throughout July, and new dining options such as Oink’s restaurant, focusing on Iowa-sourced pork products.

Underground was reimagined for the 2024 season with upgraded animatronics, special effects, and an enhanced storyline. A special ceremony featured an actor portraying Sheriff Sam, who used a dynamite plunger box to "blast open" the mine. On Opening Day, riders received a limited-edition Daily Adventure newspaper, presenting fictional stories tied to the ride’s storyline. The refurbishment also included a new entry portal with an updated Underground logo. Underground remains the world's only fully enclosed wooden roller coaster.

In August 2024, Adventureland hosted its first-ever drone show, with three shows. Originally, Adventureland had planned to feature fireworks every Friday night throughout the summer as part of the Festival of Decades. However, Prairie Meadows, a neighboring horse track and casino, protested the plan to the Altoona City Council. In response, Adventureland planned a three-night drone show, August 16-18, which was the largest drone show of its kind in Iowa. Guests also got to help pick which rides would be featured in the show.

Adventureland welcomed its first-ever national American Coaster Enthusiasts (ACE) event on Saturday, August 17, 2024. The event, Preservation Con, gathered hundreds of coaster enthusiasts from across the country to celebrate historic roller coasters. During the event, ACE officially recognized Tornado as a Roller Coaster Landmark.

=== Herschend era (2025–present) ===
Herschend officially acquired Adventureland Resort, along with all other Palace Entertainment properties, on May 27, 2025. The planned acquisition was first announced on March 18, 2025, when Herschend had signed a definitive agreement to acquire all of Palace Entertainment’s U.S. properties from Parques Reunidos.

== Themed areas and attractions ==
The park contains many design nods inspired by Disneyland. The entrance has a train station with two tunnels (on the left- and right-hand side) leading into the Main Street area, just like at Disneyland or Walt Disney World's Magic Kingdom (and also similar to many other parks built since Disneyland opened in 1955); over in Outlaw Gulch, there are several tombstones that have virtually the same wording as tombstones outside of Walt Disney World's Haunted Mansion attraction; the rocking pirate ship (Galleon) has played a soundtrack that included splashing water and an excerpt from the Pirates of the Caribbean theme song, "Yo Ho". Adventureland is a theme area of its own at Disneyland. The different themed areas in Adventureland are:

- Adventure Bay (opened June 22, 2008) is a location behind Outlaw Gulch that is home to the Kokomo Kove water play area.
- Alpine Village is a German-themed area. The Rathskeller concession stand and Alpine Arcade are located in this area. In 2015, the new Bier Garten opened featuring TV sets and German beers. In the early years, an accordion player was found in this area of the park to add to the German feel.
- Bernie's Barnyard is a children's area which replaced the Country Picnic Ground Area which had been there since 1988 and was removed in 2017, the area opened on July 20, 2018, The Area has a playground structure, a toddler play area, Kiddie Arcade Games, gift shop, seating and shaded areas, statue of the park's mascot Bernie Bernard, food stand and one kid's ride: a Pony Trek from Metallbau EmmeIn called Junior Jockeys.
- The Boulevard has several major rides; the biggest is Giant Sky Wheel, the largest open-gondola Ferris wheel built in the United States since G.W. Ferris built his wheel in 1893 for the Chicago Exposition.
- County Fair is a rural-themed area where the principal attraction is Tornado, a large wooden roller coaster, as well as many fair-themed games of skill.
- Dragon Island, near the rear of the park, was originally known as Riverview. Constructed in 1979, the area contained a number of attractions from the Riverview Park amusement center that had recently closed in nearby Des Moines. In 1990, the area was renamed Dragon Island when the Dragon roller coaster opened. While the Dragon was removed during the 2020 season, the area is still called Dragon Island.
- Iowa Farm is home to the Storm Chaser, Iowa Beer and Wine, and Petunia Pig (a small concession stand shaped like a pig).
- Last Frontier is a western themed section. This section of the park is home to the Monster roller coaster, the Golden Nugget shooting gallery and Sam Adam's Saloon.
- Main Street, which resembles a conventional turn-of-the-20th-century town square, is the first area that visitors encounter upon entering the park. The principal attractions of this area are the A-Train (a small-scale locomotive that winds around one side of the park) and an antique-style carousel in the middle of the Town Square. Main Street contains the bulk of the park's shops and a restaurant. Also on Main Street is the Palace Theater. It was formerly home to large live shows but today is only used for group events.
- Outlaw Gulch, constructed in 1993, has an Old West theme, complete with a "ghost town". The attractions in this part of the park are Outlaw (a small CCI wooden roller coaster), Chuck Wagon (a small western-themed Ferris wheel), Sidewinder (a swinging pendulum ride whose gondola swings riders over 180 degrees while spinning) and Saw Mill Splash, a water ride. The Royal Hanneford Circus is also presented. During the 1993 season, there was a western-themed band that played a banjo and bottles on the mock stage that still remains behind to the kettle corn stand. Also in the first few years of operation, a cowboy-themed comedy show was held in front of the ghost town facade, but it was later removed and the shooting gallery was installed there. The food location also changed from a walk-in drink and snack bar to a front counter serving hamburgers and other fast food. Other food vendors in the section include a kettle corn stand, old-fashioned sodas, and Dippin' Dots.
- River City is inspired by Mississippi River towns. There is usually jazz or zydeco music in the background. The founder of Adventureland was a fan of New Orleans-style jazz. River City may have been influenced by the fictional River City in the Meredith Willson musical The Music Man. Several food stands are located in this section of the park as well.

== Rides ==
=== Roller coasters ===
Ride Name	Picture	Year Opened	Manufacturer	Model	Location	Other Notes
Dragon Slayer		2021	S&S - Sansei Technologies	4D Free Spin	Dragon Island	Replaced the Dragon
Monster		2016	Gerstlauer	Infinity Coaster	Last Frontier	Opened June 4, 2016, replacing the River Rapids log ride. On July 10, 2016, on-ride pictures were added.
Outlaw		1993	Custom Coasters International (CCI)	Wooden Roller Coaster	Outlaw Gulch	Opened April 24, 1993, along with the new Outlaw Gulch section.
Phoenix		2019	Maurer AG	Spinning Coaster/SC2000	Boulevard	Opened July 4, 2019. Originally scheduled for June, but it was delayed due to inclement weather stalling progress during that month. An individual car seats 4, 2 front-facing and 2 rear-facing. As it travels along the track, the car unpredictably spins 360°.
Tornado	First drop	1978	Designed by William Cobb; Built by Frontier Construction Company	Wooden Roller Coaster	County Fair	Opened July 4, 1978 – Up until 1996 both red and blue trains would run at the same time. In 2010, on-ride pictures and seat belts were added.
Underground		1996	Custom Coasters International	Enclosed Dark Ride Coaster	Last Frontier	An indoor dark ride using a roller coaster ride system. Ride and cars by CCI. Animated figures by Themed Environments and Effects. underwent a major refurbishment along with an addition of seatbelts in 2024.
Flying Viking		2023	Zamperla	Junior Coaster	Boulevard	Entwined with super flume ride, Draken Falls.

=== Other rides ===
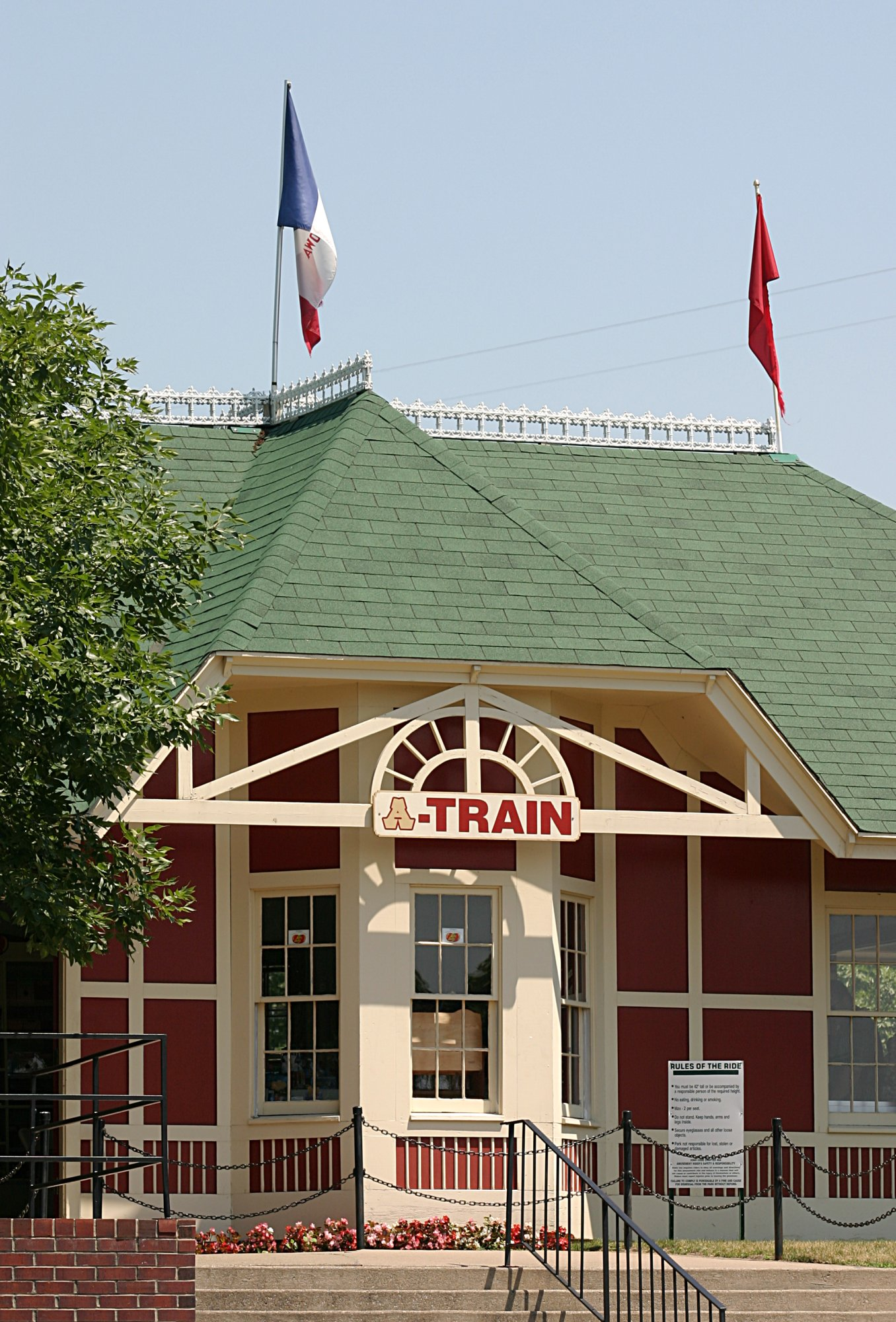
South side view of the A-Train station

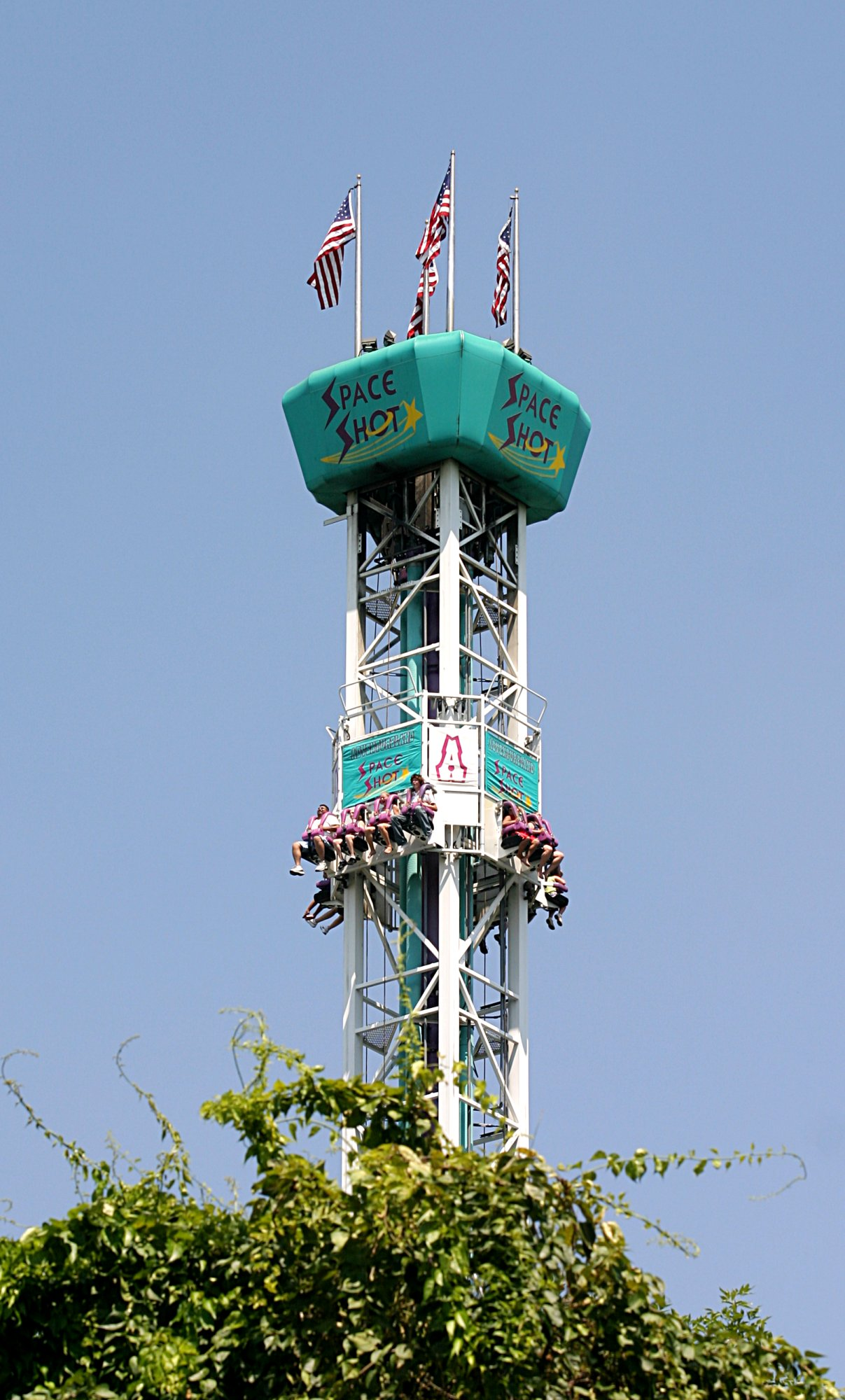
The top of the Space Shot

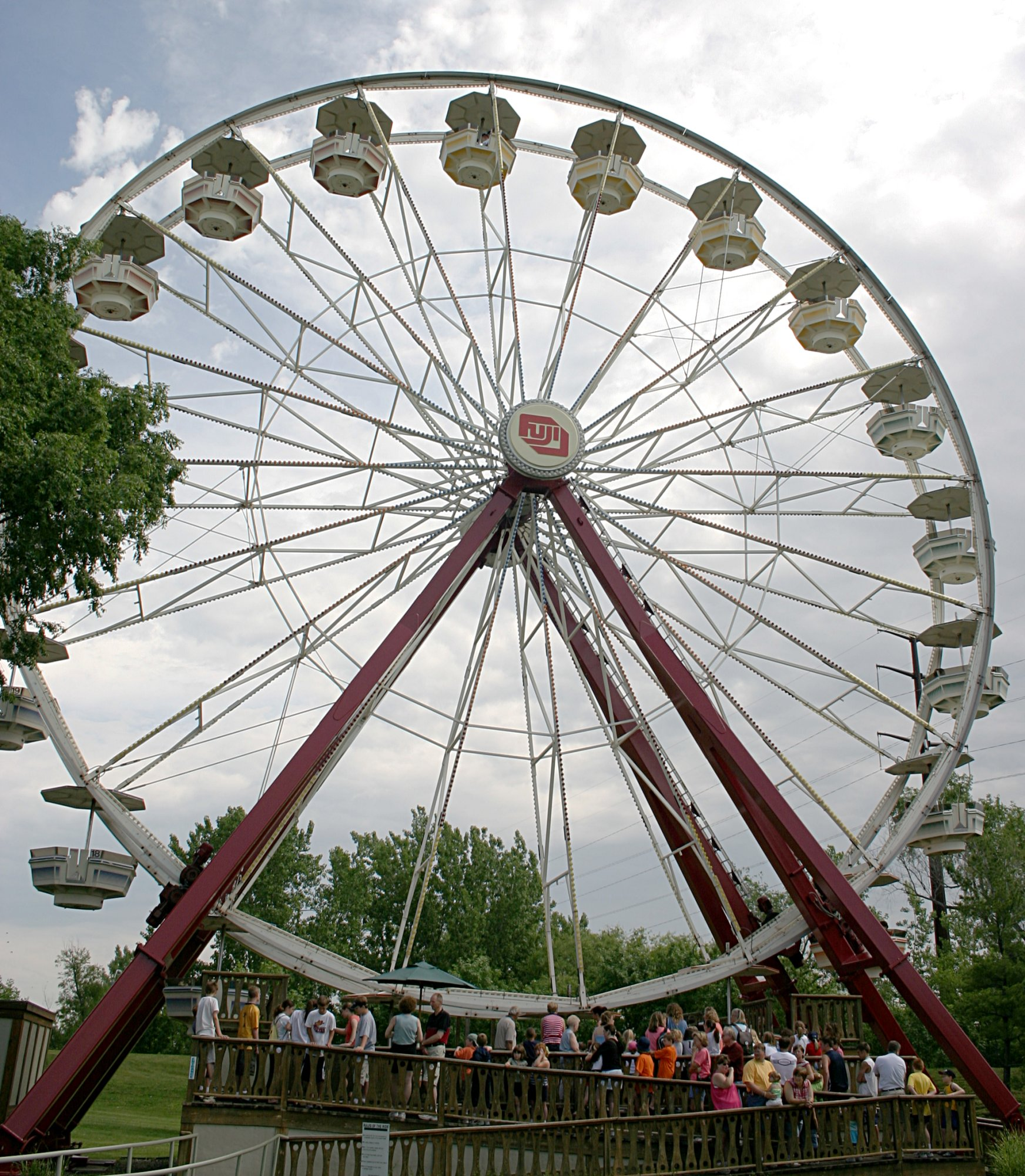
Giant Sky Wheel

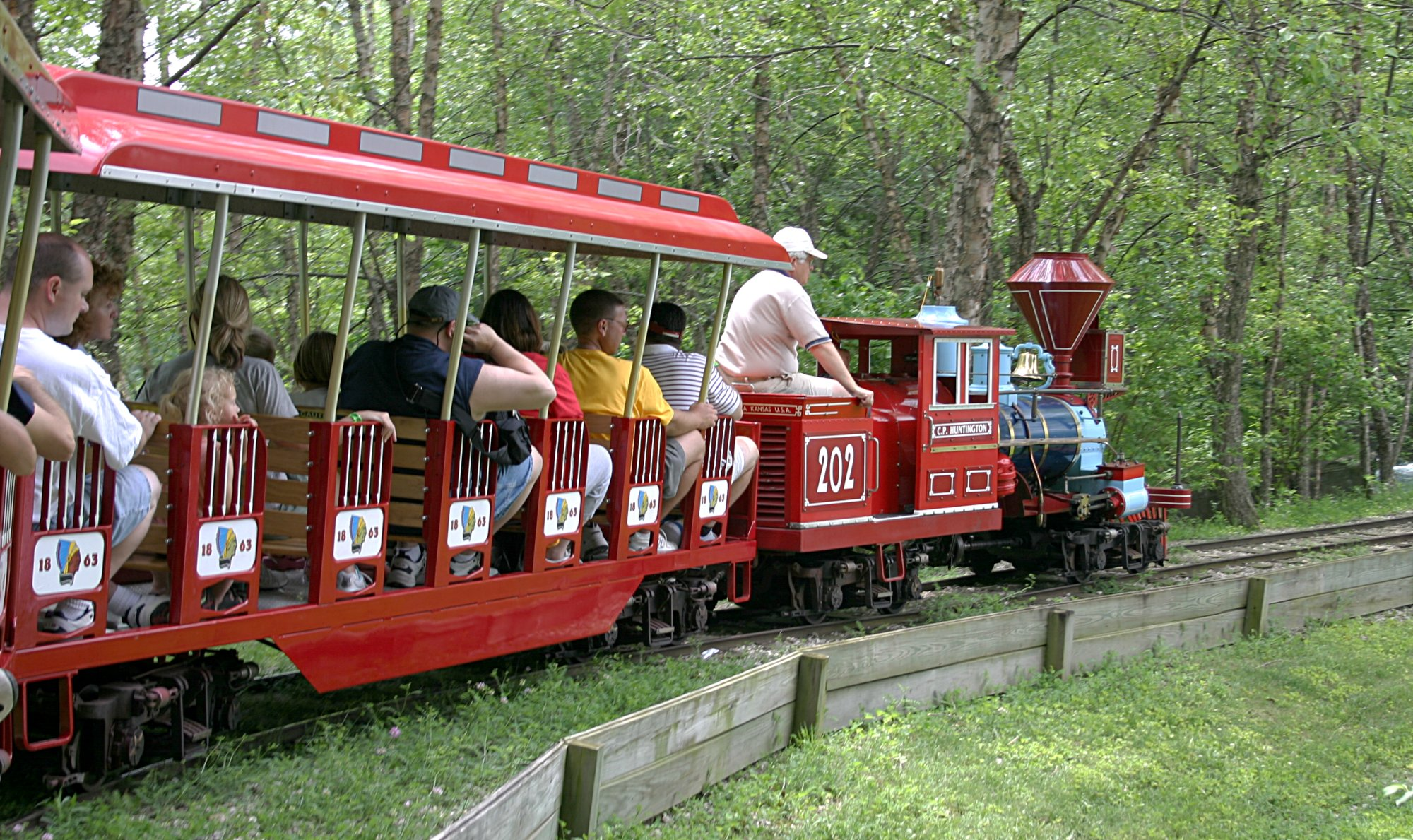
A-train engine and car

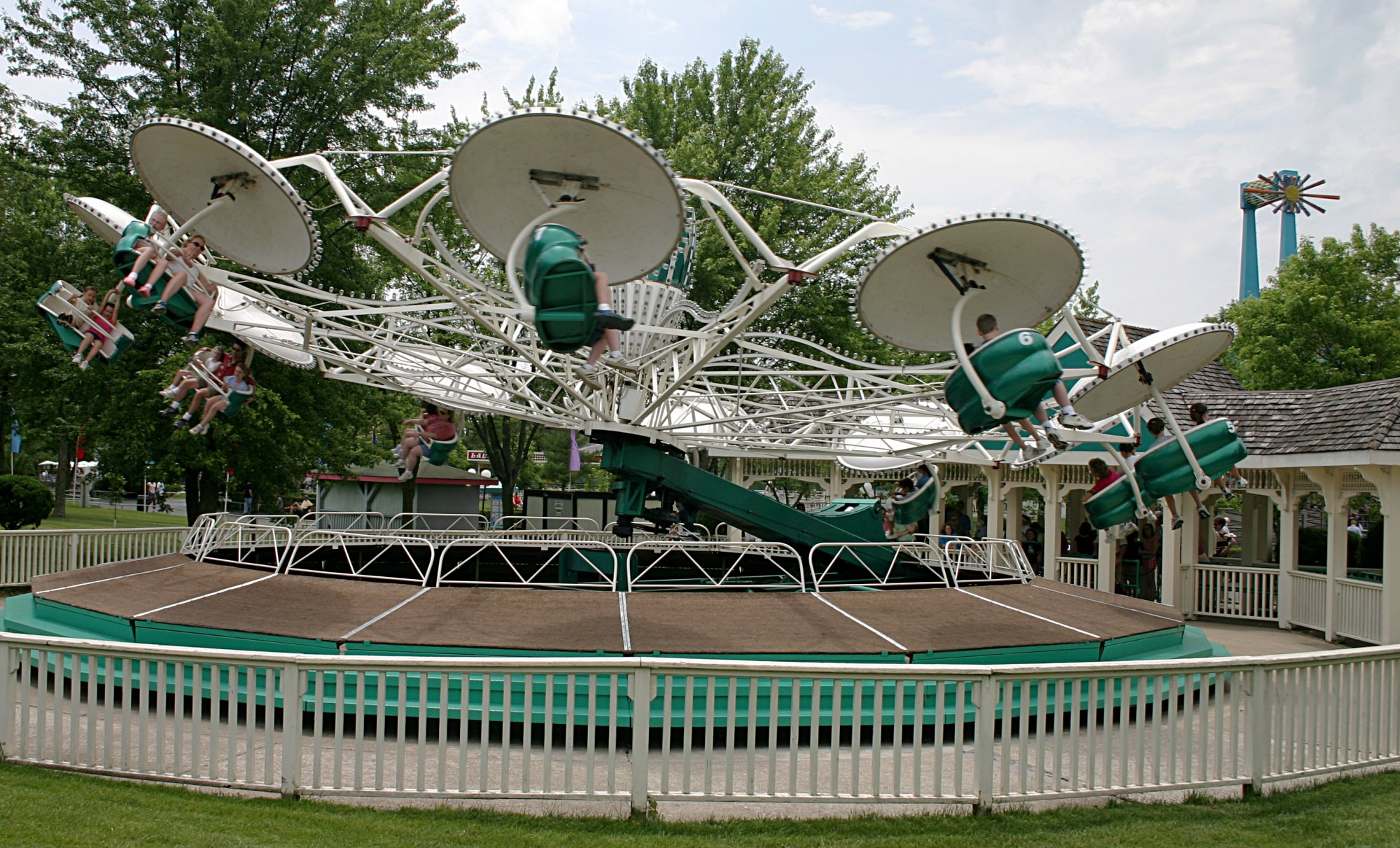
Parachutes when it was known as Der Flinger

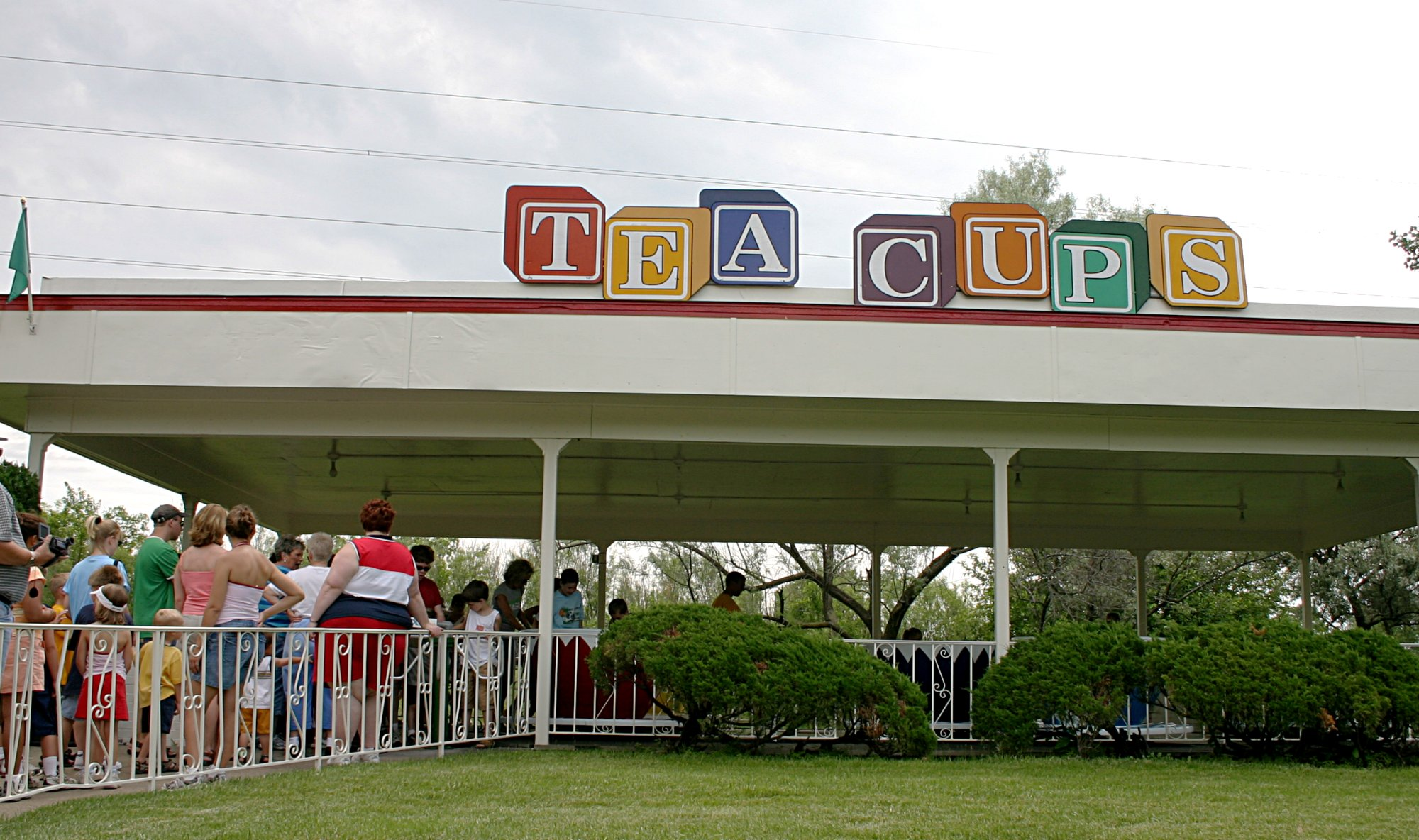
Tea Cups

Ride Name	Year opened	Manufacturer	Model	Section	Notes
A-Train	1985	Chance	Train ride	Main Street	Small train that travels around one side of the park, then loops and returns on the same track. In mid 2022 A Fuel Injected train engine replaced the original front train engine/ Its only stop is the station on Main Street. Replaced the Toonerville Trolleys.
Bernie's Swing	2022	Zamperla	Happy Swing	Dragon Island	A swing that rocks riders back-and-forth.
Chuck Wagon	1993	Zamperla	Mini Ferris Wheel	Outlaw Gulch	A miniature western-themed Ferris wheel (opened in 1993).
Circus Balloons	2022	Zamperla	Samba Balloon		Eight hot-air balloons rotate around a central axis with spinning tubs.
Clipper	2022	Sartori	Junior Pirate Ship		Miniature swinging boat ride.
Convoy	1989	Zamperla	Convoy	River City	A semi-truck-themed ride for younger children. Replaced the Haunted House in 1989. It was relocated west of Frantic Freeway in 1990 and relocated again next to the former Raging River bridge in 2021.
Dragon's Nest	1991	Zamperla	Aero Top Jet	Dragon Island	Dragon-themed cars spin around a central axis. Originally located on Dragon Island. Relocated closer to Dragon Slayer for the 2021 season.
Flying Tigers	2022	Zamperla	Junior Suspended Whip	Dragon Island	Eight planes whip around the far turns of an oval-shaped course producing an exciting swinging motion. Originally announced as Warhawks.
Frantic Freeway	1974	Barbieri Rides	Bumper Cars		Traditional bumper cars ride. Opened August 16, 1974. New bumper cars with lap bars added to ride in 1991.
G-Force	1997	HUSS	Breakdance	Main Street	Spinning ride on the order of a Scrambler. Located where Draken Falls and Flying Viking are now located. It was replaced by the scrambler in 2011 when it was relocated inside the newly built Main Street arcade.
Giant Sky Wheel	1991	Chance	Ferris Wheel		Large Ferris wheel. Replaced Der Flitzer.
Hampton Cars	1980	Hampton	Umbrella Ride		Various themed cars spin slowly around a central axis. Originally opened in 1972 at Riverview. This ride replaced Adventureland's first carousel which was called the happy horses/ Relocated in 2021 where the Infant Ocean was.
Junior Jockeys	2018	Metallbau Emmeln	Pony Trek	Bernie’s Barnyard	A farm-themed Pony Trek that takes riders around a small track while riding a pony on a metal rail. Located in Bernie's Barnyard. Opened on July 20, 2018.
Lady Bugs	1976	Royal Cascade	Roundabout	River City	Bug-shaped cars travel on a circular track. Relocated in 2022 near River City Foods.
Leap Frogs	2022	Zamperla	Jump Around	River City	Frogs bounce as they spin around a central axis.
Lighthouse	2022	Zamperla	Pump & Jumpz	River City	Interactive bouncing tower. Replaced the original Lighthouse ride.
Parachutes	1976	Hrubetz	Paratrooper		Paratrooper ride. Originally named Der Flinger, but was renamed during the 2020 season.
Red Barons	1978	Allan Herschell	Helicopter		Small World War I-themed planes spin around a central axis and riders can control how high off the ground they want to "fly". The ride was originally "Helicopters" in 1974, but the helicopters were replaced with airplanes in 1978 and the ride was renamed Red Barons.
Revolution	2022	Zamperla	Rockin' Tug		Ship rotates as it rocks back and forth along a half-pipe.
Rockin’ Rainbow	2022	Zamperla	Flying Carousel		Flying carousel swing ride.
Tilt-A-Whirl	1975	Sellner Manufacturing	Tilt-A-Whirl		Tilt-a-Whirl ride.
Runabouts	2021	Sartori	Boat ride		Miniature boats spin slowly around a central axis.
Scrambler	1975	Eli Bridge	Scrambler	River City	Classic Scrambler ride. Originally located across from the Oink's pond, where Flying Viking and Draken Falls are located (1975-1987). It was originally known as the Super Scramble then renamed Bavarian Scrambler in 1976, reopened as the Wrangler in Outlaw Gulch (1993-2001), and reopened again in 2011 as the Scrambler in the former location of G-Force. Relocated in 2022 to where the Lady Luck was in River City.
Shakin' Bacon	2018	Skyline Attractions	Crazy Couch		A farm-themed Crazy Couch that raises riders up and down while tilting side to side, Originally located in Bernie's Barnyard. Opened on July 20, 2018. Originally announced as Pig Out. Relocated in 2024 where the Clipper stood.
Sidewinder	2004	Moser's Rides	Frisbee	Outlaw Gulch	Spinning pendulum ride that swings riders slightly more than 180-degrees. Seatbelts added in 2007.
Space Shot	1999	S&S	Drop Tower		Visitors blast off into "space" up a 200-foot (61 m) tower and free fall safely back to the ground.
Speedway Racers	2022	Zamperla	Junior Whip Speedway 8	Main Street	A whip-style ride featuring two-seater race cars.
Saw Mill Splash	2002	WhiteWater West	Spinning Raft	Outlaw Gulch	Family waterslide with splash-down at the bottom.
Storm Chaser	2014	Mondial	Windseeker	Iowa Farm	Swing ride that takes passengers up a 260-foot tower and spins them around at 35 mph replaced the Silly Silo.
Tea Cups	1976	Philadelphia Toboggan Company	Crazy Daisy		Traditional "crazy daisy" tea cups ride.
Town Square Carousel	2000	Chance	Carousel	Main Street	Replica of an antique carousel; replaced the old carousel where the Himalaya now stands.

=== Former attractions ===
Name	Opened	Closed	Manufacturer/Ride Type	Location/Other Notes
Antique Roadsters	1979	1987		The layout of the ride itself was there from 1974 'till 1987. The ride was renamed the Antique Roadsters when the cars were changed from jeeps to antique cars in 1979.
Balloon Race	1987	2022	Zamperla	Family ride that spins riders in hot air balloon-shaped cars. Replaced the Flying Scooters.
Carousel	1979	1999		A carousel ride that replaced Adventureland's first carousel near Iowa Farm. It was relocated in 1980 to the new Riverview Island which is now Dragon Island. It was replaced by the Himalaya.
Der Flitzer	1974	1990	Zierer	A small German snow-capped mountain-themed coaster. Built in 1972 for the German Fair Circuit/ Sold to Adventureland after 1973/ Formerly called "Raylle Racers" (1974–1975), Originally located where Oinks now stands. It was relocated and renamed in 1976. The Giant Sky Wheel now occupies its space.
Dragon	1990	2019	Hopkins	Double looping roller coaster. Replaced by The Dragon Slayer in 2021.
Falling Star	1989	2021	Chance	Rotating platform ride; replaced The Rainbow.
Flying Scooters	1976	1986		Replaced by the Balloon Race.
Frog Hopper	2006	2023	S&S	A mini version of the Space Shot, seats bounced up and down on a 20-foot tower.
Galaxy	1980	1989	Soli Himalaya	A Himalaya ride that came from Riverview Park, operating there 1973–1978. Replaced by Puff Dragons, then became the Dragon Island games pavilion.
Galleon	1985	2023	Zamperla	Pirate ship swinging ride. Replaced by Iowa Craft Beer Takeover.
Happy Horses	1974	1978		Adventureland's first carousel, replaced by the Hampton cars.
Haunted House	1980	1988	Funni-Frite	Part of the Riverview area (now Dragon Island) and one of the attractions moved from Riverview Park in Des Moines. This attraction opened at Riverview 1975–1978. Replaced by the Convoy for one year, before becoming the station for the Dragon.
Helicopters	1974	1977	Allan Herschell	A small kids' helicopter ride that spun in the air. The helicopters were replaced with airplanes and the ride was renamed Red Barons in 1978.
Himalaya	2000	2022	Wisdom Rides	Spinning, tilted ride. Replaced the Riverview Carousel.
Infant Ocean	1975	2020		Miniature boats spin slowly around a central axis.
Inverter	2000	2017	Chance	Ride took guests up 50 feet (15 m) in the air and hangs them inverted. Replaced the Super Screamer roller coaster, and was later replaced by Phoenix in 2019.
Jaunty Jeeps	1974	1978		The layout of the ride itself was there from 1974 to 1987, old fashioned cars people got to drive with a center track on the path to keep people from driving off the ride. This attraction was located where the picnic area is. The cars were changed from jeeps to antique cars in 1979 which caused this attraction to be renamed as the Antique Roadsters.
Lady Luck	1974	2021	Chance	Opened August 16, 1974. Trabant ride with a roulette wheel theme. Purchased by Cedar Fair and relocated to Carowinds where it reopened as Gyro Force in 2023.
Lighthouse	1976	2021	Hrubetz Rides	Traditional hurricane carnival ride.
Mirror Maze	1980	1989		Part of the Riverview area (now Dragon Island), and one of the attractions moved from Riverview Park in Des Moines. A small selection of fun mirrors remain at the exit of The Dragon.
Mixer	1997	2005	Zamperla	Spun and inverted visitors on several axes, replaced by Splash Over.
Queen	1974	1984		The boat itself was a passenger steamer that was used to carry passengers across Lake Okoboji in Okoboji, Iowa. She served from 1884 until 1973 when she was sent to Adventureland. It docked by where today sits the river city funnel cake stand. The boat ran on an underwater track, but due to mechanical problems, the queen was replaced by the "River Boats." After a renovation, the Queen returned to her dock in River City in 1980. She remained there until 1984 as a walk through attraction with a dixieland band.
Raging River	1983	2021	Intamin	Whitewater river raft ride with rapids, waterfalls, and geysers.
River Boats	1977	1979		Paddlewheel boats that replaced the Queen. Due to mechanical problems, the Queen was moved to a corner of the lake. After a renovation, the Queen returned to her dock in River City in 1980 as a walk through attraction.
River Rapids (Log Ride)	1974	2015	Divitron	A log flume ride with two drops, replaced by The Monster. In 2006, on-ride pictures were added.
Sky Ride (originally Sky Seats)	1975	2021	SLI	Traditional chairlift ride originally from the World's Fair in Spokane, Washington. The Clock building that covers the sky ride was added in 1976. The Sky Ride ran in Washington in 1974 then in 1975 it was given to Adventureland as a gift for the park's first full operating season.
Splash Over	2006	2019	Moser's Rides	Thrill ride where riders are propelled and inverted; replaced the Mixer, which opened in 1997.
Silly Silo	1974	2013	Chance	A traditional rotor ride, replaced by the Storm Chaser.
Super Screamer	1976	1999	S.D.C.	A smaller Galaxi model roller coaster built by S.D.C., replaced by The Inverter.
Toonerville Trolleys	1974	1979		A set of three 1890s replica trolleys built by Gordon Wiligrocki. The trolleys ran on natural gas, touring the perimeter of the park with various stops. The name comes from the popular newspaper comic strip Toonerville Folks and the Des Moines Interurban route that ran through Altoona that was nicknamed the "Toonerville Trolley." Was replaced by the A-Train.
Pontoon Boats	1974	1976		A pontoon boat ride around the same pond that the Queen would travel. Unlike the Queen, the boats were not on a track. The boat docked where the Dragon Island bridge is now located.
Wee Critters (Petting Zoo)	1974	1975		Located in the Iowa Farm section of the park, where the Storm Chaser now stands.

== Adventure Bay ==
Adventure Bay is the water park section of Adventureland. It opened as Adventure Island in 2008 with the addition of Kokomo Kove. Heron Harbor splash pad was added in 2009. The water park was renamed Adventure Bay prior to the 2010 season due to Adventure Island in Tampa, Florida holding the trademark on the Adventure Island name. A major addition in 2010 made Adventure Bay a full-scale water park. In addition to the water features, it offers changing areas, lockers for rent, lounge chairs and food service which includes a full-service bar named the Sand Bar.

Ride Name	Year opened	Manufacturer	Notes
Bermuda Quadrangle	2010	ProSlide Technology	A quartet of tube slides, which can be ridden on single or tandem tubes. Tubes can be picked up and returned at the base of the slide tower, free of charge. There are height minimums of 48 inches (120 cm) for a single rider to 42 inches (110 cm) for a child accompanied by an adult on two of the four slides. There is a weight maximum of 250 lbs for these slides. The slides each have unique features, including sections of complete darkness, four small funnels and a large funnel.
Breaker Beach	2012		Opened on May 26, 2012. It is Iowa's largest wave pool.
Caribbean Cruiser	2010	ProSlide Technology	A lazy river looping one-third of a mile around, with a depth of 3 feet (0.91 m). Visitors can rent tubes for $5 or just cruise along with no tube.
Gang Plank and Pirates Plunge	2010	ProSlide Technology	Two speed slides that zip riders along at high speeds. Visitors must be at least 48 inches (120 cm) to ride the two speed slides.
Heron Harbor	2009		Splashpad located next to Kokomo Kove.
Kokomo Kove	2008	WhiteWater West	A water play structure opened on June 22, 2008, and is included in the standard admission price. The Kokomo Kove structure is approximately 65 feet (20 m) tall at its highest point and covers approximately 30,000 square feet (2,800 m^{2}). The feature includes 7 water slides of varying lengths and heights; 123 different water jet features, including water guns, tipping cones, hose jets and umbrella jets; and 91 different play features, including net bridges and climbs, crawl tunnels, and pull ropes.
Reef Racer	2010	ProSlide Technology	six slides hooked together to create a racing slide, where riders lie face-first on mats and slide down, "racing" other guests. Visitors must be at least 42 inches (110 cm) to ride.
Shipwreck Shores	2012		Opened with Breaker Beach. It is a kiddie pool with a pirate ship-themed water slide for kids and swim-up beverage center just for kids.
Hyperlight	2010, revamped in 2025	ProSlide Technology	A two-person raft ride with iSlide technology added in 2025, featuring lights and sound. There is one large funnel and many twists and turns. Minimum height is 48 inches (120 cm). Previously named Typhoon (2010-2024).

== Games areas ==
The games department consists of three games areas:

- Alpine Games – Alpine is located near the front of the park close to the Giant Sky Wheel.
- County Fair – opened 1980, According to park operators, this is Adventureland's most popular games area. County Fair is a rather large games area and features many popular games, including Speedball, Derby Downs, Center Ring and Skee Ball. County Fair is unique in that the area is very long, whereas the other two areas are more circular. The north part of the area, sometimes called "The Iowa Farm Section," is where the entrance to Tornado is located. The Iowa Farm Section features Speedball, County Fair's most popular game.
- Dragon Island – renamed as Dragon island in 1990 the area was originally called Riverview Island which was built in 1980, Despite not being as big as County Fair or Alpine, Dragon Island ranks 2nd in popularity. Dragon Island has a much different atmosphere than County Fair or Alpine. While County Fair and Alpine have a more fun atmosphere, playing upbeat, popular music that most guests will be able to recognize, Dragon Island has a more mellow atmosphere, playing slow music without vocals.

== Food ==
The park features snack stands and sit-down counter service locations. The sit-down locations include Coca-Cola Cafe, Doc & Leone's Diner, and Oink's.

== Special events ==
Every year on July 4, Adventureland presents fireworks 15 minutes before the park closes.

Adventureland also hosts various events during the off-season when the park is closed. Visitors enter through an open gate at the front entrance and are allowed only in the Main Street Palace Theater which is connected to the Doc and Leone's Diner on Main Street for food and snacks.

During the first few weekends of operation, various school bands are invited to play in the park.

Each year, substance-free days are held in conjunction with D.A.R.E.

Over Memorial Day weekend there is a military promotion.

There are four park areas available for company picnics, reunions or other large gatherings.

On October 3, 2015, Adventureland hosted its first Oktoberfest event. A $10 admission (with free parking) included one beer and access to a limited selection of rides and attractions during this one day event. Dozens of food and drink stands were brought in to the park (many from outside vendors). As of 2022, the event had been moved to the end of September, and full-price admission was $69.99.

== Shows ==
=== Current shows ===
- Ben Ulin magic show, added in 1988, in Sam Adam's Saloon.
- Iowa Beer and Wine Shop stage features live local music acts.

=== Former shows ===
- Adventureland Circus (2017-2020) Replaced the Royal Hanneford Circus with Billy Martin remaining as Ring Master.
- American Puppet Theater (2017-2022) Performed and created by Libby Weston, at the Chapel stage.
- Circo de Luz (2021-2022) Circus relocated to the area west of Frantic Freeway, with Billy Martin remaining as Ring Master.
- Comedy Juggler Brad Weston (2014-2022) Originally performed at the Chapel stage (2014-2015) and at the Coca-Cola Cafe (2016-2022).
- Dolphin Sea Lion Show (1977–1979 & 1988–1989) Located where The Underground is now. The swimming pool remains.
- Daniel and the Dixieland Diggers (1983-1999). Animatronic music show in the center of Main Street, replaced by the Carousel.
- Family Fun Zone (1992-1994) Contestants were selected from the audience to participate in stunts and games like Beat The Clock. The Underground is now in this space.
- High Diving Act, (1980-1982, 1986–1987, 1990–1991) Located where The Underground is now. The swimming pool remains.
- Palace Theater shows (1974-1996), live shows were formerly held in the Palace Theater.
- Royal Hanneford Circus (1997–2016) replaced by the Adventureland Circus, the Circus tent was originally located behind Outlaw. In 2008, construction of the water park caused the circus to be relocated just behind the Saw Mill Splash with a new access walkway between that ride and exit of Outlaw.

== Incidents ==
Multiple incidents have occurred at Adventureland, three of which resulted in deaths.

=== Lighthouse ===
On August 23, 1978, a 15-year-old employee suffered head injuries when he backed into the ride while it was still in motion.

=== Sky Ride ===
On August 24, 1990, an 18-year-old employee lost his right arm while operating the ride. The employee tossed a cigarette lighter into the air and it got stuck in the machine. When the employee went to retrieve the lighter, his arm got stuck, and severed his arm at the shoulder.

=== Dragon ===
On June 8, 1991, four riders were injured on Dragon when its lift chain broke. All four were treated for minor injuries at a nearby hospital, and the ride was repaired and returned to operation.

=== Tornado ===
On July 28, 2006, an 11-year-old girl sustained head trauma after being struck by a piece of wood left behind by maintenance staff on Tornado. The injured girl was transported to a local hospital where she underwent surgery for a severe blood clot and swelling.

=== Raging River ===
On June 7, 2016, a 68-year-old employee attendant on the platform of the Raging River ride fell onto the conveyor belt system that moves rafts back up to the boarding station. According to a witness account, the employee lost his balance as the operator set the rafts in motion. He suffered a fractured skull resulting in a severe brain injury and died three days later at a nearby hospital. Iowa's Occupational Safety and Health Administration conducted an investigation that found no evidence the park willfully violated safety protocols, and that the ride was operating as designed. The park was fined a maximum $4,500 for the accident, and OSHA recommended installing additional controls to prevent the movement of the ride until all ride operators were in a safe location.

On July 3, 2021, a raft on Raging River carrying six passengers overturned, sending four guests to a local hospital with severe injuries. One of the passengers, an 11-year-old boy, later died. The ride was inspected the day before the incident and was found to be in normal working order. Although park officials said their employees' actions were "prompt", eyewitness accounts stated that first responders were off-duty emergency personnel from the Altoona police and fire departments that were not notified by park staff. A review of the communication during the incident show that 911 dispatchers were first notified by a bystander. When firefighters arrived, they faced multiple obstacles including a chained gate entrance to the park designated for emergency responders. Ambulances originally went to the wrong gate in the confusion, and when they arrived at the proper gate more than 15 minutes into the response, direct access was blocked by the setup for the nightly fireworks display, causing an additional delay.

=== Underground ===
On July 30, 2019, a child was injured while riding The Underground when his foot became lodged between the train car and the loading platform as the ride was leaving the station. The ride was stopped, and the child was treated for an ankle injury at a local hospital.

=== Sky High Coasters contractor ===
On January 23, 2023, Zachary Alesky, a 20-year-old contractor for Sky High Coasters, slipped on ice while carrying a steel beam and was crushed by it. He was revived but died in surgery.
