= Outlaw (roller coaster) =

Wooden roller coaster in Adventureland

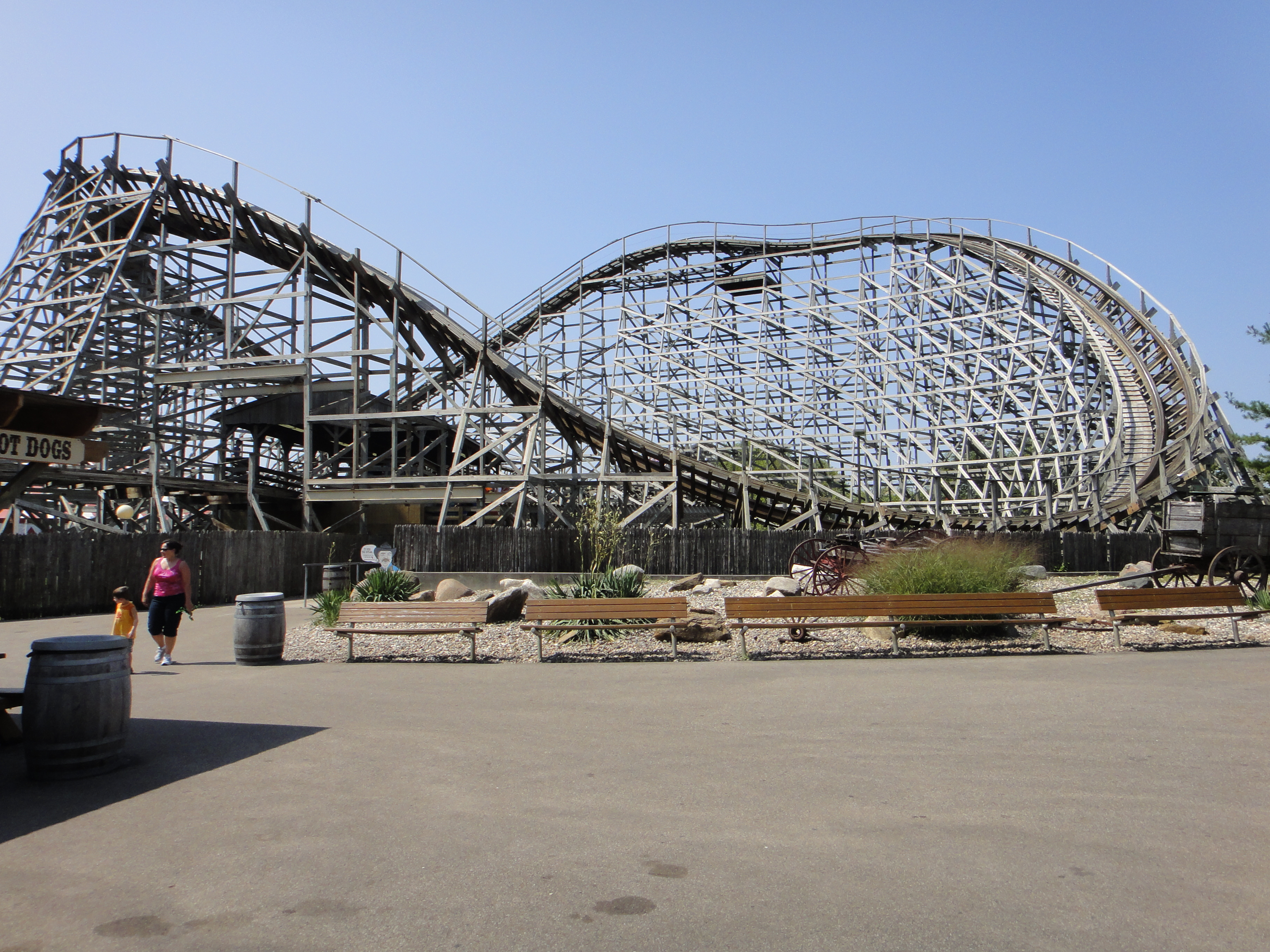

Adventureland (Iowa)
- Location: Adventureland (Iowa)
- Park section: Outlaw Gulch
- Coordinates: 41°38′56.75″N 93°30′2.10″W
- Status: Operating
- Opening date: April 24, 1993
- Cost: US$2,000,000

General statistics
- Type: Wood
- Manufacturer: Custom Coasters International
- Lift/launch system: Chain-lift
- Height: 67 ft (20 m)
- Length: 2,800 ft (850 m)
- Speed: 48 mph (77 km/h)
- Inversions: 0
- Duration: 2 minutes
- G-force: 3.2
- Height restriction: 42 in (107 cm)
- Trains: Single train with 6 cars; riders arranged 2 across in 2 rows for a total of 24 riders per train
- Outlaw at RCDB

Outlaw is a wooden roller coaster located at Adventureland in Altoona, Iowa, near Des Moines.

Outlaw made its debut in 1993. It was the second roller coaster constructed by Custom Coasters International, a company that soon became recognized as one of the world's leading builders of wooden roller coasters.

The original spokesperson for Outlaw was a character depicting an old miner, featured in television, radio, and print advertisements for Adventureland. For many years, a cartoon representation of him was displayed outside the lower queue of Outlaw, on the height chart.

== The "Prototype" for Great Coasters International ==
Even though Outlaw was built by CCI, it was designed by Mike Boodley, who later went on to form Great Coasters International. In fact, Outlaw is considered to be the prototype GCI roller coaster as it laid the groundwork for coasters like Lightning Racer and Kentucky Rumbler.
