= The Monster (Adventureland) =

Roller coaster at Adventureland

Monster
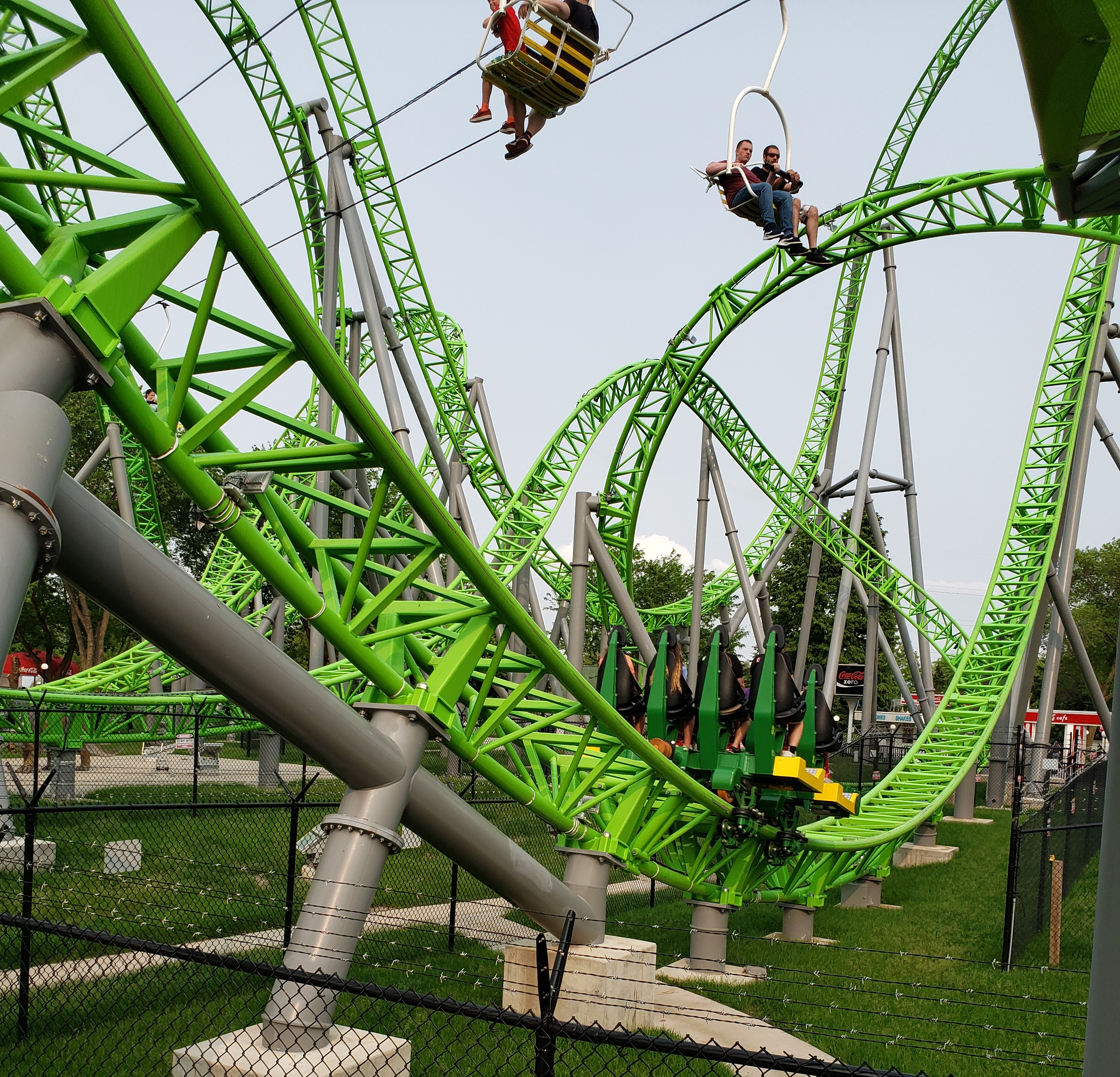

Adventureland (Iowa)
- Location: Adventureland (Iowa)
- Park section: Last Frontier
- Coordinates: 41.651820°N 93.501448°W
- Status: Operating
- Opening date: June 4, 2016
- Cost: $9 million
- Replaced: River Rapids Log Flume

General statistics
- Type: Steel
- Manufacturer: Gerstlauer
- Model: Infinity Coaster
- Track layout: Infinity Coaster - Custom
- Lift/launch system: Vertical Chain Lift Hill
- Height: 40.6 m (133 ft)
- Length: 762 m (2,500 ft)
- Speed: 105 km/h (65 mph)
- Inversions: 5
- Duration: 2 minutes
- Max vertical angle: 101°
- Capacity: 3 cars - 8 riders each - 720 riders per hour
- Height restriction: 48 in (122 cm)
- Monster at RCDB

Monster is a Gerstlauer steel roller coaster at Adventureland in Altoona, Iowa. It opened to the public on June 4, 2016 as the first Infinity Coaster in the United States.

== History ==
Monster was announced on Adventureland's Facebook page on July 8, 2015. It replaced the River Rapids Log Ride, a log flume which was removed due to maintenance issues. The park was looking for a suitable replacement for the ride.

On June 4, 2016, Monster opened to guests.

== Ride experience ==
The ride, located in the center of the park, can be distinguished by its bright-green track. Monster features a vertical 133-foot (41 m) lift hill and a first drop at a 101-degree angle. At the bottom of the hill the riders reach a top speed of 65 miles per hour (105 km/h). The next element is a large overbanked turn, providing a significant amount of hangtime, after which the riders are redirected into a hill and then navigate the twisted drop that goes directly into a Finnish loop, before going into a dive loop that will take riders into an air time hill then an Immelmann loop. The car then goes into its only set of trim brakes, an overbanked turn and its final inversion, a corkscrew.

== Characteristics ==
The ride features 2,500 feet (760 m) of track, five inversions and takes roughly two minutes to complete. Monster features a nighttime LED display made up of 46 ground lights and 137 track-mounted fixtures provided by KCL Engineering. The Monster lighting system originator and designer, Mike Lambert, was recognized with (2) Illuminating Engineering Society (IES) Illumination Awards for Innovation in Design.
