= Tornado (Adventureland) =

Roller coaster at Adventureland

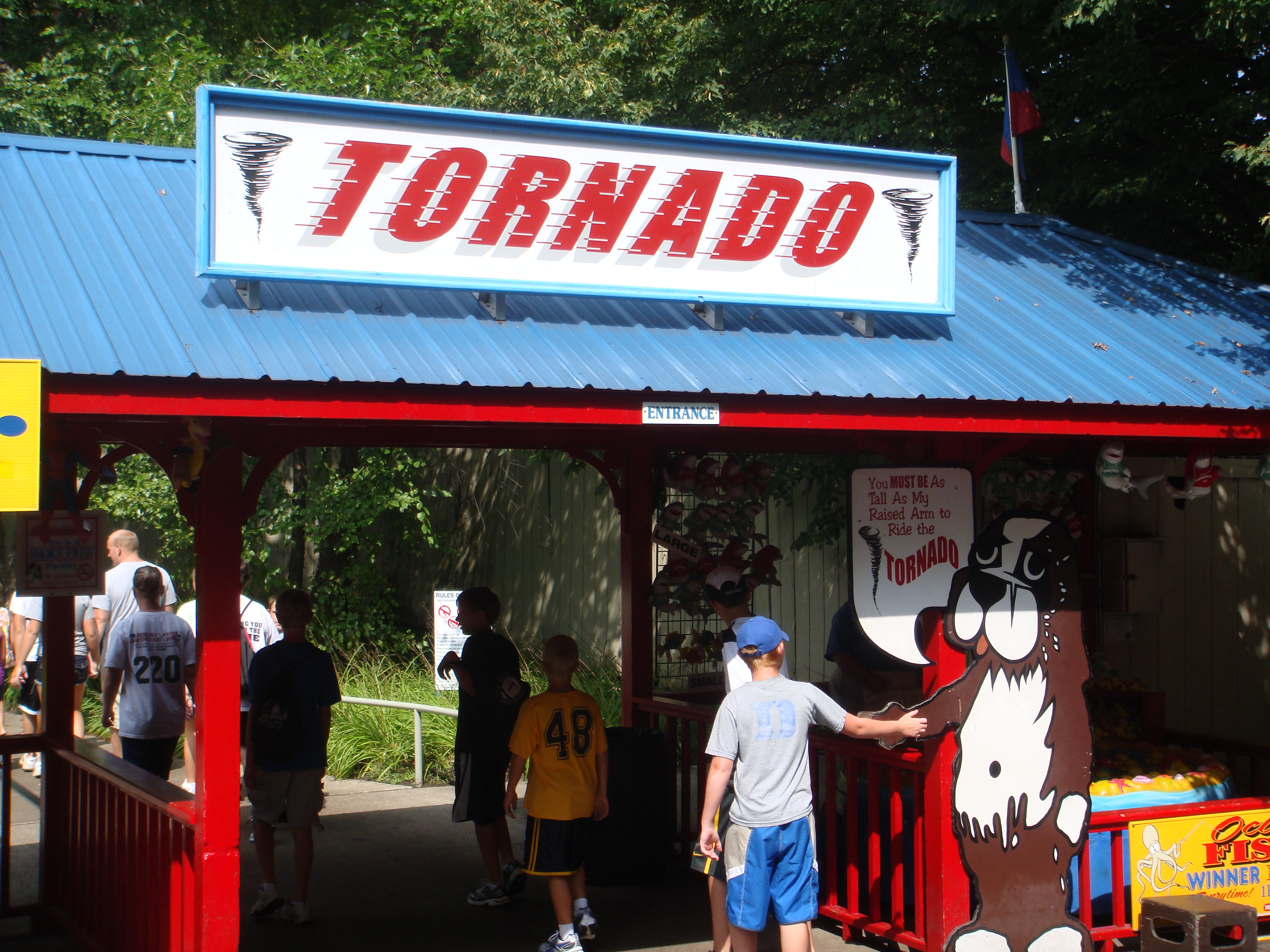
- Ride entrance

Adventureland (Iowa)
- Location: Adventureland (Iowa)
- Park section: County Fair
- Coordinates: 41°39′5.25″N 93°30′9.07″W
- Status: Operating
- Opening date: July 4, 1978

General statistics
- Type: Wood
- Manufacturer: Frontier Construction Company
- Designer: William Cobb
- Track layout: Out and Back
- Lift/launch system: Chain-lift
- Height: 93 ft (28 m)
- Length: 2,850 ft (870 m)
- Speed: 58 mph (93 km/h)
- Inversions: 0
- Duration: 2 minutes
- Height restriction: 42 in (107 cm)
- Tornado at RCDB

The Tornado is a wooden roller coaster located at Adventureland in Altoona, Iowa, near Des Moines.

The Tornado made its debut on July 4, 1978, during Adventureland's third full season. It was designed by William Cobb, and built by the Frontier Construction Company. The name Tornado has special significance for the park. Adventureland was to open for its debut season in July 1974. However, a real tornado hit the park before it could open, and caused it to be delayed until August of that year. When the ride debuted in 1978, park advertisements exclaimed "Another Tornado has hit Adventureland!" In 2024, the American Coaster Enthusiasts designated Tornado as a Coaster Landmark.

== Layout ==
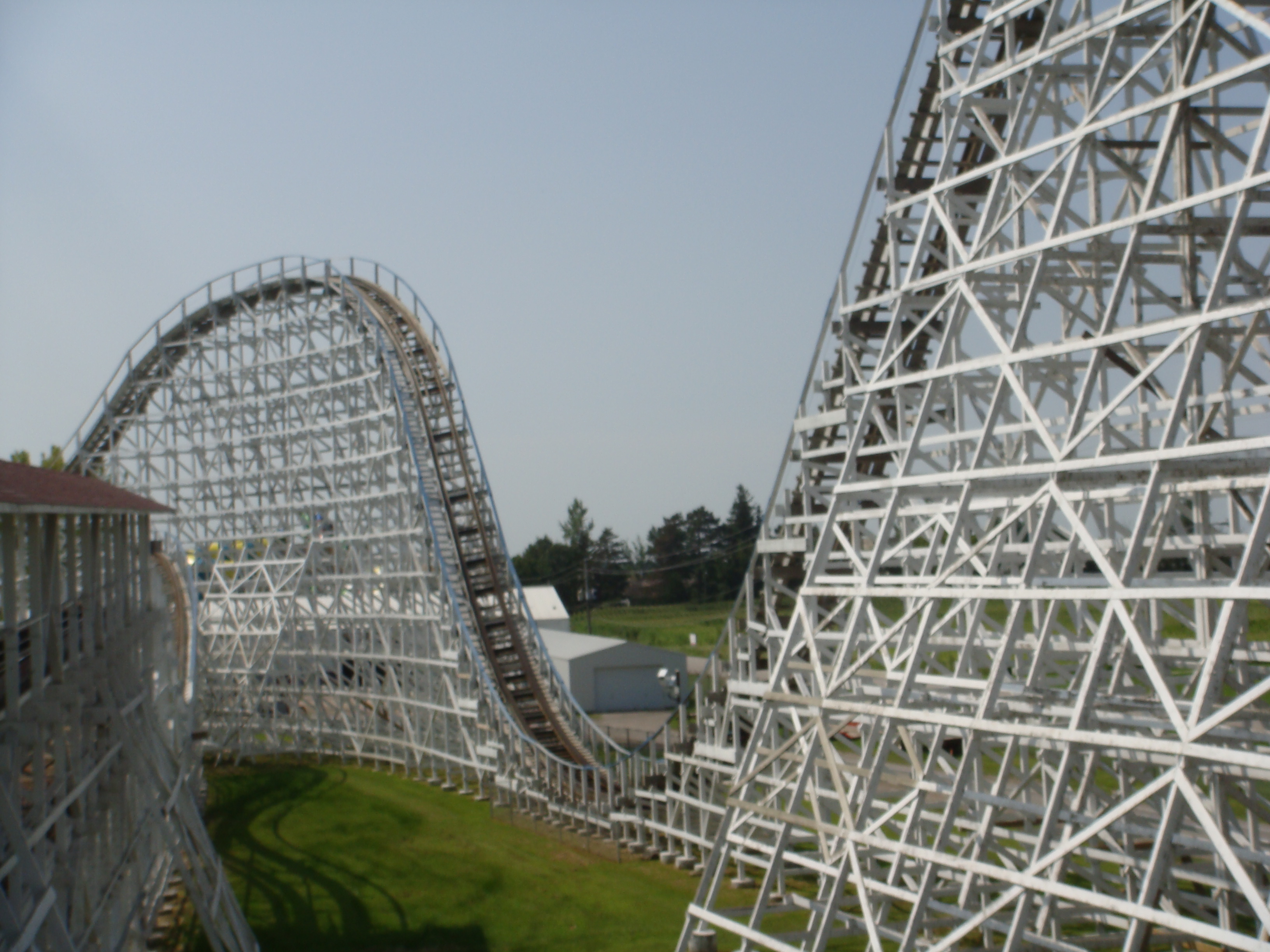
First drop

The layout of the Tornado is a unique 90 degree curved out and back that follows the shore of a small lake. After leaving the station, the train coasts down a small incline, around a curve, and heads up the lift hill to the top of the first drop. This drop, which is the largest in the ride, can provide for some air time depending on where riders are seated on the train. The second drop is considerably shorter but leads into the third drop, which contains a "head-chopper" moment at the bottom as the track ducks under some support structures for the return track, which is immediately to the rider's left at this point in the ride. After drop three, there is one more small hill, by the Outlaw, and then the train rounds a banked turn and heads back to the station via three additional smaller drops.

Previously, during busy periods, two trains could be run at the same time. During two-train operation, the goal (for optimum rider throughput) is to have the second train ready to 'release' when the first train hits the midpoint of the track, which is the banked turn where the first train switches from "out" to "back". In case something goes wrong with loading, there is an extended covered area beyond the station with skid-brakes where the first train can stop and wait for the second train, if necessary. If this occurs, the second train will enter the station once the other train has started up the lift hill. However, due to safety restraints added to the ride, two-train operation was no longer possible due to the extra time required to harness the riders. The two trains were swapped mid-season until very recently Adventureland announced off season the Tornado will undergo updates to resume 2 train operations after almost 30 years without it. The ride will begin 2 train operations again beginning in 2027 1

== 2006 Accident ==
Tornado accident
- Date: July 22, 2006
- Deaths: 0
- Injuries: 3

On July 22, 2006, a loose board left on or near the track of the Tornado by a maintenance worker was responsible for injuring Mackenzie Jennings, an 11-year-old girl. The board hit the girl in the head and knocked her unconscious. She underwent surgery at Mercy Medical Center in Des Moines to remove a blood clot and reduce swelling in her head. State inspectors who later inspected the ride themselves discovered the board had not come from the Tornado itself and allowed the ride to re-open. Two others were also injured in this incident.
