= Chessington World of Adventures =

Theme park in England

Chessington World of Adventures Resort
- Previously known as Surrey Zoological Gardens; Chessington Zoo; Chessington World of Adventures & Zoo
- Interactive map of Chessington World of Adventures Resort
- Location: Leatherhead Road, Chessington KT9 2NE, Greater London, England
- Coordinates: 51°20′55″N 0°19′00″W
- Status: Operating
- Opened: 1931 (Zoo); 7 July 1987 (Theme park)
- Owner: Merlin Entertainments
- General manager: Nick Bevan
- Slogan: We've got it!
- Operating season: Theme Park: February – December (Full park offering between March - November); Zoo & SeaLife Centre: Year-round; Safari Hotel; Year-round; Azteca Hotel; Year-round
- Attendance: 2022: 1,500,000 (▲3%)
- Area: 128 acres (0.52 km^{2}; 52 ha)

Attractions
- Total: 34
- Roller coasters: 5
- Water rides: 3
- Website: www.chessington.com

Chessington World of Adventures Resort is a 128 acres (52 hectares) theme park, zoo and hotel complex in Chessington, Greater London, England, around 12 miles (19 km) southwest of Central London. The complex originally opened as Surrey Zoological Gardens in 1931, later becoming Chessington Zoo, and under The Tussauds Group debuting in 1987 as one of the first combined animal-amusement parks in the UK. The theme park, which features over 40 rides, is owned by Merlin Entertainments, following its merger with The Tussauds Group in 2007. Under Merlin, Chessington has been increasingly developed into a resort and tourist destination, including two on-site hotels, swimming pools, a spa, and fitness facilities.

The Chessington Zoo has over 1,000 animals, including western lowland gorillas and sea lions. It is split up into several areas; Trail of the Kings, Sea Lion Bay, Children's Zoo (until 2024), Amazu, Penguin Bay, a Sea Life Centre and Wanyama Village and Reserve.

Chessington World of Adventures was ranked in 2022 as the twentieth most-visited park in Europe, with an attendance of roughly 1.5 million guests, behind Alton Towers, Thorpe Park and Legoland Windsor. In 2020, due to restrictions associated with the COVID-19 pandemic, the park experienced an unexpectedly short operating season and temporarily closed its gates. Despite a significant drop in attendance during the pandemic, Chessington actually ranked as the third most-visited park in the UK for 2020 with .51 million visitors, behind Alton Towers and Thorpe Park.

Chessington World of Adventures features different themed areas, loosely inspired by a range of world cultures, with 'Adventure Point' at its centre. 'Shipwreck Coast' is a nautical harbour town, 'Wild Woods' is a Central European-styled area, 'Forbidden Kingdom' mirrors the ancient Middle East, and 'Land of the Tiger' reflects the Far East. Major attractions include: Vampire, Dragon's Fury, KOBRA, Tiger Rock, The Gruffalo River Ride Adventure and Mandrill Mayhem.

== History ==
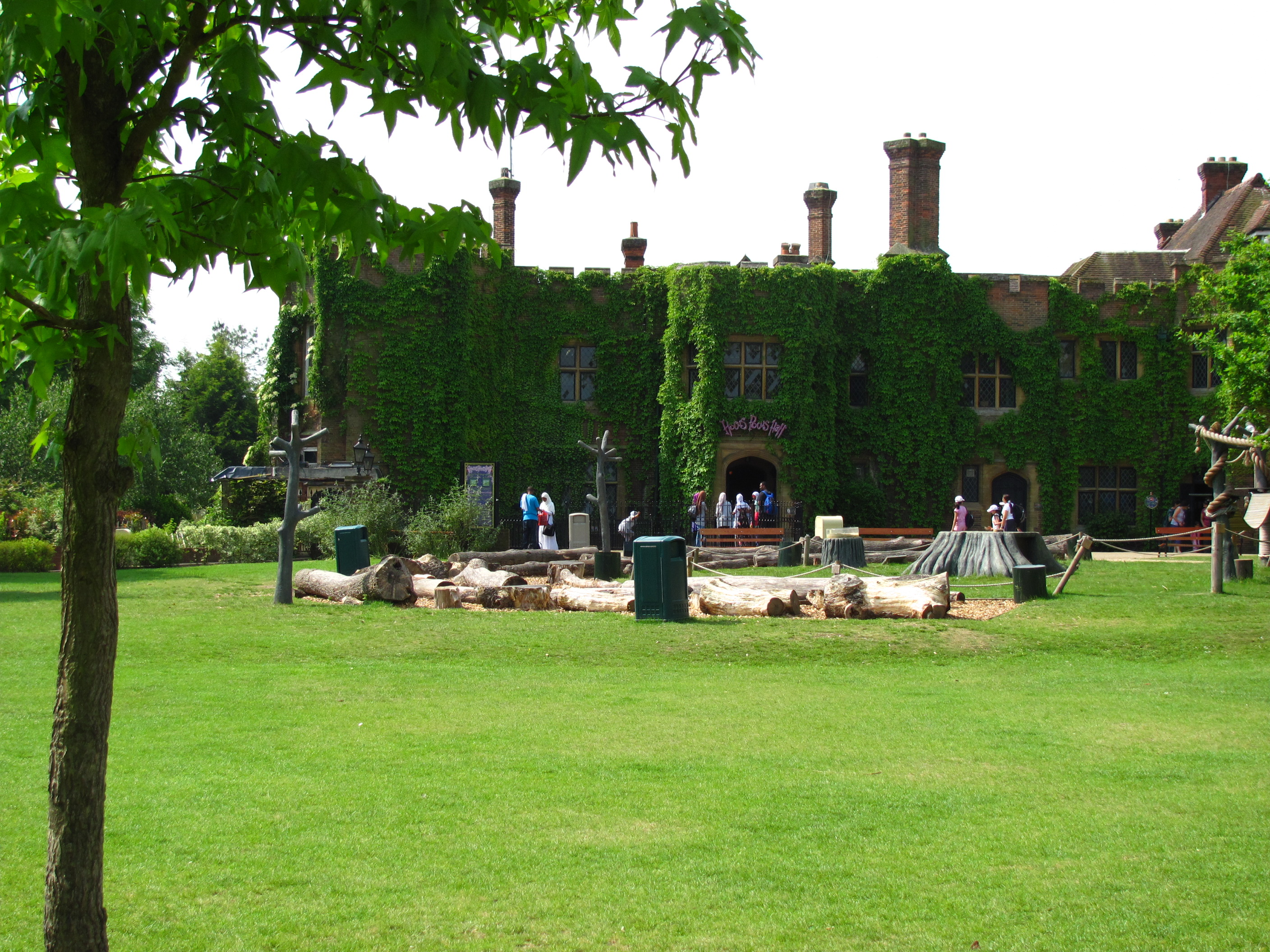
Burnt Stub Mansion is the original manor house of the estate.

The mansion at Chessington World of Adventures Resort known today as the Burnt Stub was originally built in 1348, in Chessington, Surrey. In the English Civil War it became a royalist stronghold, and Oliver Cromwell's Parliamentary forces razed it to the ground. The Burnt Stub site was rebuilt as an inn, until the 18th century, when the Vere Barker family rebuilt it in neo-gothic Victorian style.

=== Surrey Zoological Gardens ===
The park was first opened as the Surrey Zoological Gardens by Reginald Stuart Goddard. Goddard had been collecting exotic animals in a private collection, and he was driving past the "Burnt Stub" site in Chessington when he saw the mansion house and land for sale. He purchased the land and set about creating a public attraction with a range of animals and other entertainments, including a circus, funfair, and miniature railway, spending a reported £12,000. It opened on 28 July 1931, and in the first six months of trading attracted 42,000 people.

It was once the largest private zoo in England.

In 1939, World War II government restrictions on large public gatherings required the temporary closure of many entertainment venues, including the zoo. This prompted Goddard to form a partnership with Herbert Whitley, who owned a zoo then called Primley Zoological Gardens (and later to be Paignton Zoo) in Devon, and who agreed to house evacuated animals at Primley. Among the animals transferred were Peggy, daughter of the tigress Beauty and known for appearing in the film Elephant Boy, as well as a home‑bred lioness and her four cubs.

The relocation included not only a large collection of animals, but a miniature railway and entire circus including the clowns and acrobats. Not all of the animals were moved from Chessington, and some remaining in Surrey, a number of which were injured or killed by bombing in 1944.

The zoo at Paignton was re-opened to the public on Saturday 24 August 1940, with a combined collection operating as the Devon Zoo and Circus.

At the end of 1945, Goddard unsuccessfully negotiated with Whitley for a long-term lease on Primley Zoo, and he ended up closing the Devon zoo in January 1946 and moving his animals back to Chessington.

Goddard died on Christmas Day of 1946, and the zoo was sold to the Pearson Publishing Company.

In 1978, the Pearson group purchased The Tussauds Group, and transferred management of the zoo to its new subsidiary.

=== Transition to theme park ===
In 1984, due to the zoo's declining attendance, Tussauds commissioned a team including John Wardley to redevelop the park as a theme park. On 7 July 1987 Chessington World of Adventures opened to the public in a ceremony including Prince Edward.

In its first year, the park opened with the roller coaster Runaway Mine Train, the log flume Dragon River, the monorail Safari Skyway, the dark ride The 5th Dimension, and the Chessington Railroad as the main attractions (all supplied by the German ride manufacturer Heinrich Mack GmbH & Co). Smuggler's Galleon (a swinging ride) reached heights of 20 meters; it was later renamed Black Buccaneer.

The new park development adopted a pay-once price structure as opposed to the fairground's former pay-per-ride format. Other support rides were also opened and the park opened five themed areas: Calamity Canyon, Mystic East, Market Square, Toy Town and Circus World. The park was built on a relatively small budget of around £12 million.

=== Development history ===
In 1988, Smugglers' Galleon was opened in a small new area named Smugglers' Cove.

The 1990 season saw the park expand with the new Transylvania area, featuring The Vampire, the first suspended swinging rollercoaster in Europe, and Prof. Burp's Bubble Works.

In 1994, the Forbidden Kingdom area was opened, including the new Terror Tomb dark ride replacing The 5th Dimension. The area was expanded the following season with Rameses Revenge, the park's first inverting ride. Also new for 1995 was an expansion of the Toy Town area, Seastorm in Pirates' Cove and the Carousel. By 1997, the park had a maximum capacity of 15,000 guests.

In 1998, the Rattlesnake wild mouse coaster opened in Calamity Canyon. In 1999, Chessington opened the thrill ride Samurai in the Mystic East.

In 2000, Beanoland opened on the former site of Circus World, with the new rides Billy's Whizzer and Roger the Dodger's Dodgems.

From this point, Chessington's development changed direction to focus exclusively on younger families, following nearby Thorpe Park being acquired by the Tussauds Group in 1998 and its future development planned as a park for older families and teenagers. Both parks are located 20 miles from each other.

In 2004, the Land of the Dragons area opened, with the new family coaster Dragon's Fury. Also that year, Samurai was relocated to Thorpe Park and swapped for the Eclipse Ferris wheel, renamed Peeking Heights.

In 2007, The Tussauds Group was merged with Merlin Entertainments Ltd, which owned other brands such as Sea Life Centres. 2008 saw the opening of the Chessington Sea Life Centre.

The Wild Asia area was opened in 2010, featuring the new Kobra ride, as a revamp to the Beanoland area. Also in 2010, the Wanyama reserve was opened, giving the Safari hotel guests a view of animals. In 2011 the Ocean Tunnel and surrounding rooms in the Sea Life Centre were re-themed to Azteca. In 2012 a small new land named Africa replaced the ToyTown area.

In 2013, Chessington introduced Zufari: Ride Into Africa, with visitors touring a new zoo area in a safari truck.

Park developments for 2014 included the revamp of the Runaway Train as Scorpion Express and Amazu Treetop Adventure, a children's raised play area within the zoo. The park's annual Halloween event was rebranded Howl'O'Ween. Over the festive period Chessington launched the new Winter's Tail event, featuring a new seasonal show A Christmas Gift, as well as market stalls and a 60 ft Christmas tree. Attendance rose to 2.05 million guests in 2014, the second highest figure in the park's history, which previously peaked in 1995.

2015 introduced an updated Penguins of Madagascar Live: Operation Cheezy Dibbles show on the Madagascar stage, a rethemed "Jungle Bouncers" as "Penguins of Madagascar Mission: Treetop Hoppers" and "Penguin Bay", and a refurbished enclosure for the Zoo's Humboldt penguins, together advertised as "Year of the Penguins". Chessington's attendance fell in 2015 to 1.65 million. The long-running Safari Skyway monorail closed midway through the year, after 29 years of service.

Little was changed during the 2016 season, a small live show named Pandamonium opened near the zoo, a Go Ape high ropes course opened, and Trail of the Kings received some new decoration. Tomb Blaster was refurbished with all LED UV lighting and new laser gun system.

In 2017, The Gruffalo River Ride Adventure opened, replacing Bubbleworks, as well as the original Carousel being replaced with a newer, themed carousel named "The Chessington Adventure Tree". In 2018, the Mystic East area was rethemed as Land of the Tiger, with three new tiger enclosures, four tigers from Kolmården Wildlife Park, Dragon Falls rethemed as Tiger Rock and Peeking Heights removed.

In 2019, the 3D walkthrough attraction, Hocus Pocus Hall, was replaced by Room on the Broom – A Magical Journey. During the year, Chessington announced that Black Buccaneer would not open for 2019, and later that Rameses Revenge would close at the end of the season.

2020 saw the opening of a small new area named The Rainforest, with three attractions: a kids track ride, Jungle Rangers, a relocated mini log flume from Weymouth Sealife named River Rafts, and the rethemed Treetop Hoppers ride. The Flying Jumbos Ride was also relocated and rethemed into Elmers Flying Jumbos based on the children's book. 2021 saw a new family drop tower 'Croc Drop' open, replacing Rameses Revenge. Blue Barnacle also opened to replace Black Buccaneer.

2022 saw a retheme and refresh of the Pirates' Cove themed area as Shipwreck Coast, with the addition of two new rides. These are 'Barrel Bail Out', a Watermania ride, and 'Trawler Trouble', a Rockin' Tug relocated from Thorpe Park. Jungle Bus in Wild Asia was removed during this season and reopened in 2023. 2022 saw a new carnival event 'Mardi Grrra!' running from 27 May to 26 June.

2023 saw the opening of a new land on 15 May, 'World of Jumanji'. The new area features a B&M Shuttle Launched Wing coaster, and two SBF Visa Group attractions.

The Scorpion Express section of Mexicana and the adjacent Children's Zoo were closed for redevelopment during the 2024 season to make way for a new Paw Patrol-themed area. The revamped section opened in the spring of 2026, and features a new Zierer Force roller coaster designed specifically for younger riders. This new attraction will replace the now-defunct Scorpion Express, which was removed as part of the ongoing redevelopment project.

The Wild Asia-themed area was closed during the 2025 season in preparation for its transformation into a Minecraft-themed area, slated to open in the 2027 season. As part of this redevelopment, the KOBRA attraction will be relocated and rethemed, while a new indoor roller coaster by Intamin will be introduced.

=== Resort development ===
In June 2007, the park opened the Safari Hotel, initially operated by Holiday Inn.

In 2014, "nearly £15 million" was invested in the resort as the whole, with an extension built to the existing hotel, advertised as the "Azteca Hotel". The Safari Hotel also received a second pool.

Explorer Glamping was launched in May 2016, on the field behind Wild Asia. In 2025, the area was closed as part of the future redevelopment of Wild Asia.

== Awards ==
In 2023, at the fourth annual UK Theme Park Awards, Chessington World of Adventures won a number of gold, silver and bronze awards. It managed to win the gold Awards in the following categories: Theme Park of the Year, Best New Attraction, Best Theme Park with Animals and Best Marketing Campaign.

== Rides and attractions ==
=== Roller coasters ===
Name	Picture	Type	Opened	Area	Manufacturer	Additional information
Dragon's Fury		Steel spinning coaster	2004	Land Of The Dragons	Maurer Söhne	Family spinning coaster.
Mandrill Mayhem		Shuttle launch wing coaster	2023	World of Jumanji	Bolliger & Mabillard	Launched, shuttle Wing Coaster.
Rattlesnake		Steel wild mouse	1998	Forbidden Kingdom	Maurer Söhne	Steel Wild mouse.
Vampire		Suspended floorless coaster	1990	Wild Woods	Arrow Dynamics / Vekoma	Suspended swinging coaster.
Chase's Mountain Mission		Steel kiddie coaster	2026	World of Paw Patrol	Zierer	Junior coaster themed to Paw Patrol.

=== Flat rides ===
Name	Picture	Type	Opened	Area	Manufacturer	Additional information
KOBRA		Disk'O Coaster	2010	Wild Asia	Zamperla	A Disk-O Coaster ride. Closed during development of Minecraft World to reopen 2027.
Mamba Strike		Miami	2023	World of Jumanji	SBF Visa Group	An SBF Visa Top Dancer ride.
Ostrich Stampede	—N/a	Frog jump	2023	World of Jumanji	SBF Visa Group	An SBF Visa Super Jumper ride.
Seastorm		Sea Storm	1995	Shipwreck Coast	Mack Rides	A Mack SeaStorm ride.
Blue Barnacle		Swinging ship	2021	Shipwreck Coast	Metallbau Emmeln	Swinging pirate ship
Croc Drop		Drop tower	2021	Forbidden Kingdom	SBF Visa Group	Family drop tower.

=== Dark rides ===
Name	Picture	Type	Opened	Area	Manufacturer	Additional information
The Gruffalo River Ride Adventure		Dark ride	2017	Wild Woods	Merlin Magic Making / Leisuretec	A water dark ride based on The Gruffalo series of children's books.
Tomb Blaster		Dark ride	2002	Forbidden Kingdom	Tussauds Studios / Mack Rides	An interactive shooting dark ride themed to an Ancient Egyptian tomb.

=== Water rides ===
Name	Picture	Type	Opened	Area	Manufacturer	Additional information
Tiger Rock		Flume ride	2018	Land Of The Tiger	Mack Rides	A log flume originally with live tigers around the ride.
River Rafts		Flume ride	2020	The Rainforest	ABC Engineering	A mini log flume.
Barrel Bail Out		Watermania ride	2022	Shipwreck Coast	Zamperla	A Zamperla Watermania ride.

=== Other rides ===
Name	Picture	Type	Opened	Area	Manufacturer	Additional information
Room on the Broom — A Magical Journey		Walkthrough	2019	Chessington Zoo	Merlin Magic Making	A walkaround attraction based on the children's book by Julia Donaldson.
Zufari: Ride into Africa!		Guided safari	2013	Wanyama	Merlin Magic Making	An off-road safari truck tour that takes riders into the plains of Zufari. Increased annual park attendance by 15.4%.

=== Children's rides ===
Name	Picture	Type	Opened	Area	Manufacturer	Additional information
Canopy Capers		Tree house	2004	Land Of The Dragons	Tussauds Studios	Children's tree house climbing attraction that interlocks with Dragon's Fury
Dragon's Playhouse		Playhouse	2004	Land Of The Dragons	Tussauds Studios	Soft play area, height limit 1.4m max.
Griffin's Galleon		Kontiki	2004	Land Of The Dragons	Zierer	Small spinning pirate ship for children, the ride has a track length of about fifty feet, and 21 feet of height.
Sea Dragons		Boat Ride	2004	Land Of The Dragons	Mack Rides	Small children's boat ride.
The Chessington Adventure Tree		Carousel	2017	Adventure Point	Bertazzon	A themed carousel.
Elmer's Flying Jumbos		Mini Jet Red Baron	1987	Adventure Point	Preston & Barbieri	A spinning children's ride in which riders control how high they go, with elephant-themed cabs. Rethemed and moved as Elmer's Flying Jumbos for 2020.
Tiny Truckers		Convoy ride	1994	Adventure Point	Zamperla	Small driving attraction that usually makes two laps of its course.
Treetop Hoppers		Mini drop tower	2001	The Rainforest	Zamperla	Junior drop towers for younger children. Previously known as Berry Bouncers, "Jungle Bouncers" and Penguins of Madagascar Mission: Treetop Hoppers. Located in The New Area for 2020 The Rainforest.
Jungle Rangers		Convoy ride	2020	The Rainforest	Garmendale	Driving attraction. All ages, children under 1.1 meters must be accompanied by an adult. Replaced Toadies Crazy Cars which closed in 2019.
Amazu Treetop Adventure		Tree house	2014	Amazu	Merlin Entertainments Studios	Climbing frame with incorporated animals. No maximum height limit.
Trawler Trouble		Rockin' Tug	2022	Shipwreck Coast	Zamperla	A Zamperla Rockin' Tug, that previously operated as 'Timber Tug Boat' at Thorpe Park. Opened alongside 'Barrel Bail Out', in the newly refreshed Shipwreck Coast area, for the 2022 season.
Skye's Helicopter Heroes		Samba tower	2026	World of Paw Patrol	Zamperla	A helicopter ride themed to Paw Patrol. Under 1.1m must be accompanied by an adult.
Marshall's Firetruck Rescue		Crazy bus	2026	World of Paw Patrol	Zamperla	A bus ride themed to Paw Patrol. Under 1.1m must be accompanied by an adult. Originally located at Beanoland and Wild Asia where it operated as Bash Street Bus and Jungle Bus.
Zuma's Hovercraft Adventure		Drifter	2026	World of Paw Patrol	Zierer	A drifting ride themed to Paw Patrol that is the first of its kind in the UK. Under 1.2m must be accompanied by an adult.
Rubble and Rocky's Playzone		Playground	2026	World of Paw Patrol	Unknown	A play area themed to Paw Patrol.

=== Past attractions ===
Many of the rides and areas at the park have been re-themed over the years, while others have moved to other theme parks and been replaced.

- The Fun City Show tent, housing circus/stunt entertainment, was demolished in 1999 to make way for Beanoland to open the next season.

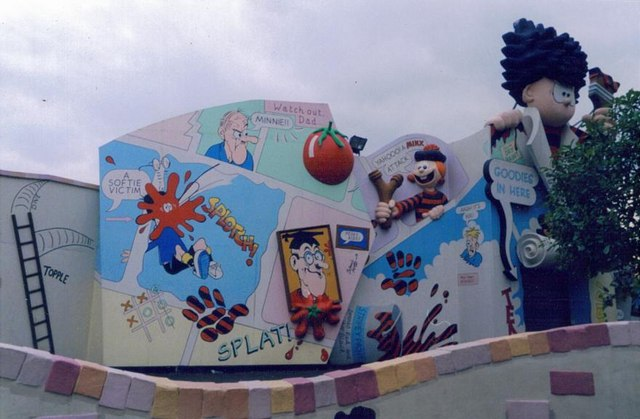
The now defunct Beanoland area, currently Wild Asia, housed several rides.

- Beanoland was an area themed around The Beano comic. It opened in 2000 and closed in 2009, featuring Billy's Whizzer, Dennis' Madhouse, Roger the Dodger's Dodgems and Bash Street Bus. The area was rethemed into Wild Asia in 2010 with all rides intact and the addition of KOBRA to the area.
- Runaway Train was a mine train themed powered roller coaster in the Mexicana area. Opened in 1987, and closed at the end of 2012. Re-themed to Scorpion Express.
- Action Man Training HQ (also called Action Man Critical Mission) was a large children's adventure playground-type attraction, opened in 1997 and closed in 2005.
- Magic Carpet was located in the Mystic East area, opening in 1988 and closed at the end of the 1998 season. Samurai (see below) was installed in its place.
- Samurai was a Mondial Top Scan installed in 1999 and closed in 2003 in Mystic East, then relocated to sister park Thorpe Park.
- Chessington Zoo Railway (12 in (305 mm) miniature gauge) closed in 1985 before the theme park had been constructed.
- Chessington Railroad (2 ft / 610 mm narrow gauge) left at the end of 1996. Although still a popular attraction, the fact that long stretches of the route were on open pathways meant it was considered a safety risk and it was removed.
- Rodeo (originally named The Juggler and located in Circus World between 1989 and 1994) was a Huss breakdance ride that closed at the end of the 2004 season. It remained closed until being removed altogether in 2007. The ride's centrepiece of a cowboy on horseback was repurposed as a prop in Vampire.
- Toytown Roundabout was also removed at the end of 1999. The more traditional carousel, which had been open since 1996 close to the park's north entrance, took its place.
- Clown Coaster, formerly Toy Town Coaster, was a very small children's roller coaster. It was removed to make way for the new Berry Bouncers ride which took its place in 2001.
- Prof. Burp's Bubble Works was a famed water dark ride in the Transylvania area, opened in 1990 and closed in 2005. It took riders on a tour of a highly animated fizzy pop factory, featuring a unique fountain finale ending. The original version was produced by Keith Sparks and John Wardley.
- Imperial Leather Bubbleworks was a dark water ride opened in 2006, succeeding the original Prof. Burp's Bubble Works. It took rides through a 'soap factory', with most its scenes heavily modified from the original attraction and now sponsored by Imperial Leather. The ride closed in September 2016 to make way for The Gruffalo River Ride Adventure.
- The Fifth Dimension was a dark ride that opened in 1987 and closed in 1993, based around the story of a TV repair robot named Zappomatic and his quest to defeat the computer-created monster, the Gorg. Replaced by Terror Tomb.
- Terror Tomb (later renamed Forbidden Tomb) was a dark ride opened in 1994, replacing The Fifth Dimension. It told the story of a tomb robber named Abdab and the various dangers he encountered as he attempted to steal a precious emerald from within the tomb. It was succeeded by Tomb Blaster in 2001. Several of the original sets remain in Tomb Blaster, but with significant alterations.
- Vampire: The Haunting in the Hallows, also known as the Black Forest from 2009 to 2013, was a walk through attraction only open during Halloween. It took place in the graveyard leading to Vampire.
- The Mystery of Hocus Pocus Hall was a walk through attraction only open during Halloween, and took place in what would normally be Hocus Pocus Hall during normal season. It followed the storyline of the park mascot, Sir Arthur Stubbs. The soundtrack of the attraction was played parkwide from 2013, until it was scrapped for 2015. The soundtrack is now used park-wide for the "Howl-o-ween" event.
- Madagascar Live! Prepare to Party was a 20-minute live stage show featuring characters from the Madagascar film franchise. It was located it the Africa area and ran from March 2012 until late 2014. It was replaced by Penguins of Madagascar Live: Operation Cheezy Dibbles in 2015 as part of 'The Year of the Penguins'.
- Safari Skyway was a historic monorail attraction that provided guests a guided overhead tour of Chessington Zoo and the Burnt Stub mansion area. Originally opening before the theme park in 1986, the ride almost lasted thirty years before closing abruptly in July 2015 due to ongoing maintenance issues.
- Carousel was a classic carousel ride located in Market Square. It opened in 1996 and closed in 2016. A new carousel was built for 2017 to serve as a spiritual successor to the original carousel. It was named The Chessington Adventure Tree.
- Penguins of Madagascar Live: Operation Cheezy Dibbles was a live show in Africa. It opened in 2015 as part of Chessington's Year of the Penguins and closed at the end of the 2016 season. It was replaced by The Gruffalo Arena in 2017.
- Peeking Heights was a Ferris wheel originally located at Thorpe Park. It was relocated to make way for Rush and opened at Chessington in 2005 and closed on 10 September 2017 in order to make way for new tiger enclosures as part of the retheme of Mystic East to Land of the Tiger for 2018.
- Hocus Pocus Hall was a walkthrough attraction located in the Burnt Stub Mansion which opened in 2003 but closed in 2018 to be replaced by Room on the Broom: A Magical Journey.
- Toadies Crazy Cars was a kids track ride located within the Africa section of the park. The ride opened as Old Crocks Rally in 1987 and was rethemed to Toadies Crazy Cars for 2001. The attraction closed in 2019, to make way for The Rainforest. The ride was replaced by Jungle Rangers, which follows a similar layout.
- Rameses Revenge was a Top Spin ride which opened in June 1995 in the Forbidden Kingdom area. Manufactured by Huss Rides, it was the world's first top spin ride to feature a drown-upside-down element. Chessington announced that it was to be removed in 2019. Before it was removed, it was the only remaining top-spin in the UK. The ride was replaced with a drop tower named Croc Drop.
- Black Buccaneer was a swinging ship ride which originally opened as Smugglers Galleon in 1988 in the Smugglers' Cove area. Manufactured by Huss Rides, the ride was rethemed to Black Buccaneer in 1999 alongside the surrounding area to Pirates’ Cove. The ride operated for the final time at the end of 2018 during the Winters Tail event. Chessington later announced on their social media that a new replacement ship was to be installed called Blue Barnacle. This new ship is thought to be entirely new ride hardware rather than the old ship simply rethemed.
- Jungle Bus was a children's Crazy Bus ride made by Italian manufacturer Zamperla. The attraction originally opened in 2001 as the Bash Street Bus in Beanoland, however was rethemed to the Jungle Bus for the new Wild Asia themed area in 2010. Following the ride being unexpectedly cut from the Feb-ROAR-y event ride line-up, it was announced that Jungle Bus had reached the end of its service life, and would be removed from the park in 2022. A new bus replaced the original Jungle Bus towards the end of the 2022 season.
- Scorpion Express was a Mack Rides Blauer Enzian coaster. The ride opened in 1987, as Runaway Train and was rethemed to Scorpion Express in 2014. The attraction was themed around an abandoned mining town taken over by scorpions. The ride featured a large animated metal scorpion that sprayed water at riders as they passed and a flame effect from an oil derrick in the centre of the ride. Scorpion Express operated for the final time in July 2022, and is set to be replaced by 'Project Play' for the 2026 season.
- Monkey Swinger was a wave swinger ride with a water element, opened in 2000 and closed at the end of 2024. Originally opened as Billy's Whizzer in Beanoland and rethemed in 2010 as part of Wild Asia.
- Tuk Tuk Turmoil was a bumper car attraction themed to tuk-tuks, opened in 2000 and closed at the end of 2024. Originally opened as Roger the Dodger's Dodgems in Beanoland and rethemed as part of Wild Asia in 2010.

== Future developments ==
In recent years, several investments have taken place in the resort in an attempt to recover from the visitor numbers lost from the COVID-19 pandemic and to remain competitive with other theme parks, including Universal's planned park in Bedford.

=== Minecraft World ===
In November 2024, the park submitted plans for an immersive new land to replace the Wild Asia themed area. The area will feature 3 rides including an indoor rollercoaster, restaurant and shop. The land is to be themed to Minecraft, which was officially announced during a Minecraft Live livestream on 21 March 2026. The rollercoaster has had its name announced on another Minecraft Live livestream on 26 September 2026, with the name of Escape The Nether. A hotel was also announced, making it the third hotel at the resort.

Name	Type	Opening	Manufacturer	Additional information
Escape The Nether	Multi dimension coaster	2027	Intamin	A predominantly indoor, multi dimension roller coaster that will become the 'world's first Minecraft roller coaster'.
Immersive Flat Ride	Spinning ride	2027	unknown	An 'immersive indoor' secondary attraction.
Relocated Kobra Flat Ride	Disk'O	2027	Zamperla	The existing Kobra ride will be relocated and rethemed as part of this land.
Minecraft World Hotel	Hotel	TBA	—N/a	A hotel that will feature Minecraft themed-rooms, a underwater diner, and more.

=== Safari Lodges ===
In line with Merlin Entertainments' ambition to invest in short break offerings, there are plans to develop 34 Safari Lodges in the Wanyama Village. It will open in 2027 alongside Minecraft World.

=== Waterpark ===
On 16 November 2022, Chessington held a public consultation regarding plans to create an indoor water park as an extension to the Safari Hotel. A public consultation closed on 30 November and plans were submitted on 30 June 2023.

== Events ==
Over the years, Chessington held a variety of events to enhance the guest experience. Themed park-wide takeovers through means of new shows, soundtracks, custom food and retail items, and additional theming were seen largely between 2022 and 2024 with Eggsplorers, Mardi Grrra, Wilderfest, and Summer Festival.

=== Howl'o'ween ===
On select days in October and November, Chessington hosts its biggest event – Howl'o'ween, previously known as Halloween Hocus Pocus. During the event the park is decorated for Halloween with various large theming elements. During the event, several shows run on different stages, and walkthrough scare attractions are available. On some event days, rides operate in the dark due to extended opening hours.

Howl'o'ween (Formerly Hocus Pocus) Scare Walkthrough History
Year	Attractions (number of seasons)		
2003	Original Event		
2004	Scooby-Doo Event		
2005	Scooby-Doo Event		
2006	Star Wars Event		
2007	Hocus Pocus Hall: Bewitched (6)		
2008	Hocus Pocus Hall: Bewitched (6)		
2009	Hocus Pocus Hall: Bewitched (6)	Black Forest Haunt (3)	
2010	Hocus Pocus Hall: Bewitched (6)	Black Forest Haunt (3)	
2011	Hocus Pocus Hall: Bewitched (6)	Black Forest Haunt (3)	The Krypt (1)
2012	Hocus Pocus Hall: Bewitched (6)	Vampire: The Haunting in the Hollows (3)	
2013	The Mystery of Hocus Pocus Hall (2)	Vampire: The Haunting in the Hollows (3)	
2014	The Mystery of Hocus Pocus Hall (2)	Vampire: The Haunting in the Hollows (3)	
2015	Curse of the Lost Tomb (4)	Trick or Treat Wood (5)	
2016	Curse of the Lost Tomb (4)	Trick or Treat Wood (5)	
2017	Curse of the Lost Tomb (4)	Trick or Treat Wood (5)	Creepy Caves Unearthed (3)
2018	Curse of the Lost Tomb (4)	Trick or Treat Wood (5)	Creepy Caves Unearthed (3)
2019	Spyders (1)	Trick or Treat Wood (5)	Creepy Caves Unearthed (3)
2020	The Forgotten Forest (2)	Creepy Caves: Resurgence (2)	
2021	The Forgotten Forest (2)	Creepy Caves: Resurgence (2)	Vile Villagers (4)
2022	Creepy Caves: Elimination (1)		Vile Villagers (4)
2023	Enchanted Hollow: Trick or Treat (3)		Vile Villagers (4)
2024	Enchanted Hollow: Trick or Treat (3)		Vile Villagers (4)
2025	Enchanted Hollow: Trick or Treat (3)	Stone Watchers: Vampire's Lair (1)	

– Previous Howl'o'ween attraction. – Current Howl'o'ween attraction.

Additional Howl'o'ween Attraction Information
- The Scooby-Doo event was what the original Halloween Hocus Pocus event was based on, featuring attractions such as The Mystery Machine and a Scooby-Doo meeting point. It was replaced in 2006 by a Star Wars based event.
- The Star Wars event was held during the 2006 Halloween Hocus Pocus event to replace the previous Scooby-Doo based attractions. Due to a poor reception, the event never returned. Instead new attractions were conceived for following events.
- Creepy Caves Unearthed won the SCARECON 2017 Award for Best Original Concept and Design and was nominated for Best Set/Costume and Make Up.

=== Winter's Tail ===
Winter's Tail is Chessington's Christmas event which runs from late November through to the new year. The resort opens with Christmas decorations and the 'Christmas Village' next to Sea Lion Bay, where children can meet Santa Claus in his Grotto and explore the 'Enchanted Hollow: Toy Workshop'. Some rides are open, including, but not limited to, the entire World of Jumanji, and The Gruffalo River Ride Adventure. The majority of the zoo is also available. A pantomime show on the 'Mane Stage' runs daily as well as singing from Christmas carollers in Adventure Point.

=== One-off events ===
- Ice Age – In August 2009, Chessington held an event to celebrate the release of Ice Age: Dawn of the Dinosaurs. The park opened a temporary maze outside Beanoland for the event.
- Vampire XXI – In April 2011 Chessington opened a temporary maze in the area outside the Vampire roller coaster to celebrate its 21st birthday. The event was free and ran for two weeks.
- Mystic East Carnival – The Mystic East Carnival was a display of arts from the orient shown in Market Square and Mystic East. The event was held in May for a number of weeks.
- 25th Birthday Celebration – During July 2012, the resort had 25 days of events to celebrate the theme park's 25th anniversary.
- African Adventures – The February half term event for many years up until 2015, this event saw African tribal dancers and street explorers can be found roaming and interacting with guests, as well as African artwork and creative activities dotted around the park.
- Animal Adventures – A weeklong celebration held during the February half term of 2016 to celebrate 85 years of the Zoo being at Chessington. Many animal talks and events went on to celebrate all Animal life at Chessington. This was a one-off event, however, it was adapted for a more general event under the same name from 2017.
- Moshi Monsters – From 25 July to 18 August 2012, the Moshi Monsters visited Chessington. The characters could be met, and there were challenges around the park which if completed could win Moshi Monster lanyards, in-game 1,000 rox codes and seeds. Each Moshling was looking after a secret symbol, collect all eight to unlock the code word and reveal a new Moshling online. Guests also had the chance to win Moshi prizes and giveaways.
- Elmer's Big Art Parade – From 19 April to 31 May 2021, where guests could join a patchwork elephant for a sculpture trail around the Resort and rides on Elmer's Flying Jumbos.
- Roar & Explore - An evening in 2023 and 2024 involving speeches and information about the charity work the Chessington Conservation Fund is involved in, as well as presentations of some of the Zoo's endangered species. All revenue goes towards the fund.

== Theme Park ==
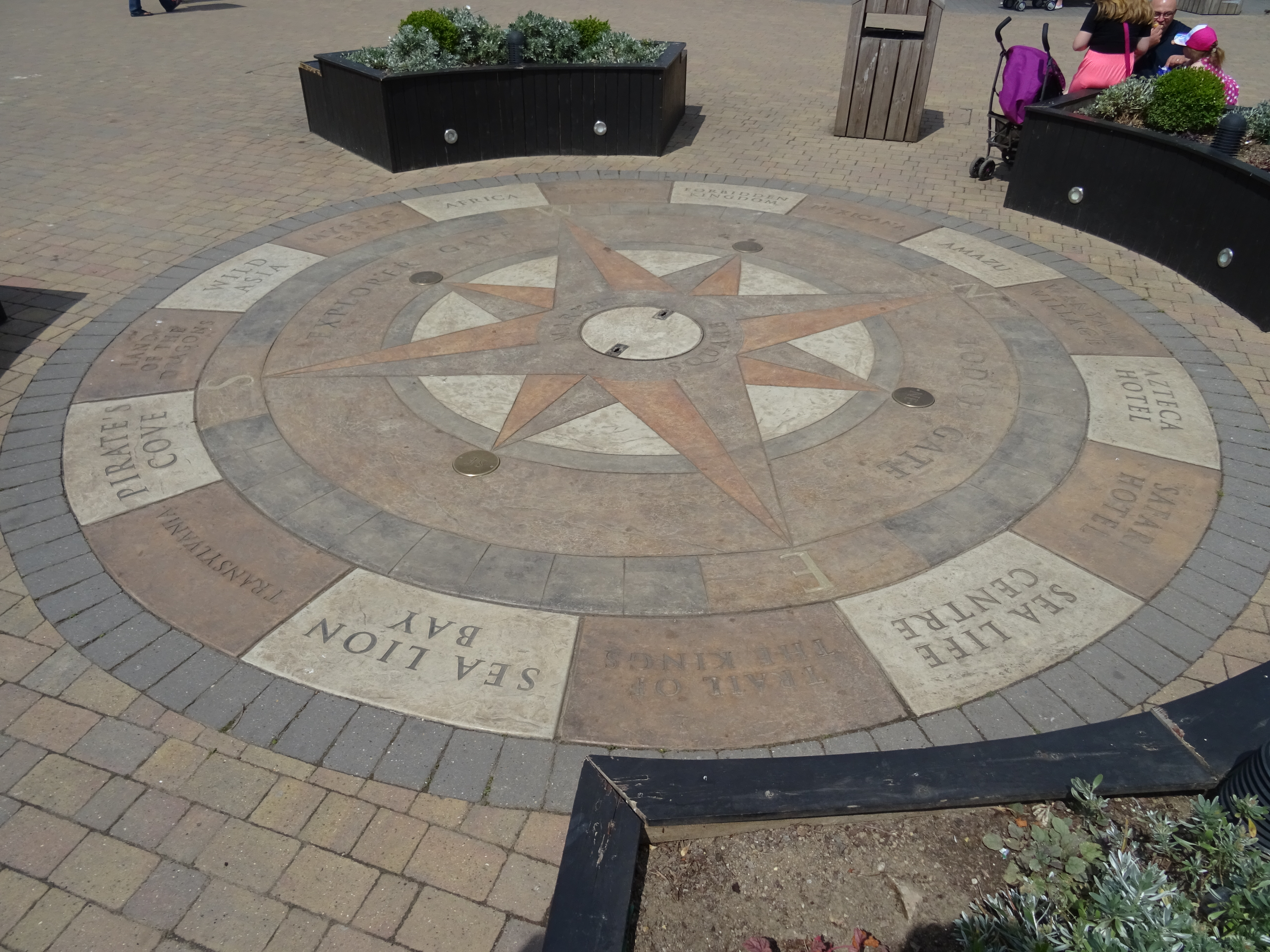
Compass in the centre of Adventure Point, with each area in the resort labelled

Chessington World of Adventures opened on 6 July 1987. Its original theme was cultural locations from around the world. Major attractions include: Vampire, Dragon's Fury, Zufari: Ride into Africa, Mandrill Mayhem and Croc Drop.

The theme park comprises 11 themed lands. The central area of the park, Adventure Point, resembles an old English market town, whereas Land of the Tiger is themed around China with the water ride Tiger Rock being there since 1987, but being rethemed to Tiger Rock (and the surrounding area) in 2018. Shipwreck Coast is a nautical adventure land. Wild Woods is modelled on a central European high street with Bavaria in Germany and the Transylvania region of Romania as its key influences. Forbidden Kingdom is based on Ancient Egypt with hieroglyphics carved onto its surroundings. Wanyama Village and Reserve is based on an African Safari, and the Rainforest is based on the Amazon. Land of the Dragons is one of the two "fantasy" themed area of the theme park and is a self-contained dragon-themed land with rides mostly for young children except for Dragons Fury, a family-thrill spinning rollercoaster that surrounds the area. The other one is World of Jumanji, which is based on the movies of the same name, with mostly thrill rides in the area.

Timeline of Park Areas

1987	1988	1989	1990	1991	1992	1993	1994	1995	1996	1997	1998	1999	2000	2001	2002	2003	2004	2005	2006	2007	2008	2009	2010	2011	2012	2013	2014	2015	2016	2017	2018	2019	2020	2021	2022	2023	2024	2025	2026
Market Square																														Adventure Point									
Mystic East																															Land of the Tiger								
Calamity Canyon												Mexicana																											World of Paw Patrol
Circus World													Beanoland										Wild Asia																
Toy Town																									Africa								Rainforest						
	Smugglers' Cove											Pirates' Cove																							Shipwreck Coast				
			Transylvania																											Wild Woods									
							Forbidden Kingdom																																
																	Land of the Dragons																						
																																				World of Jumanji			

Gallery

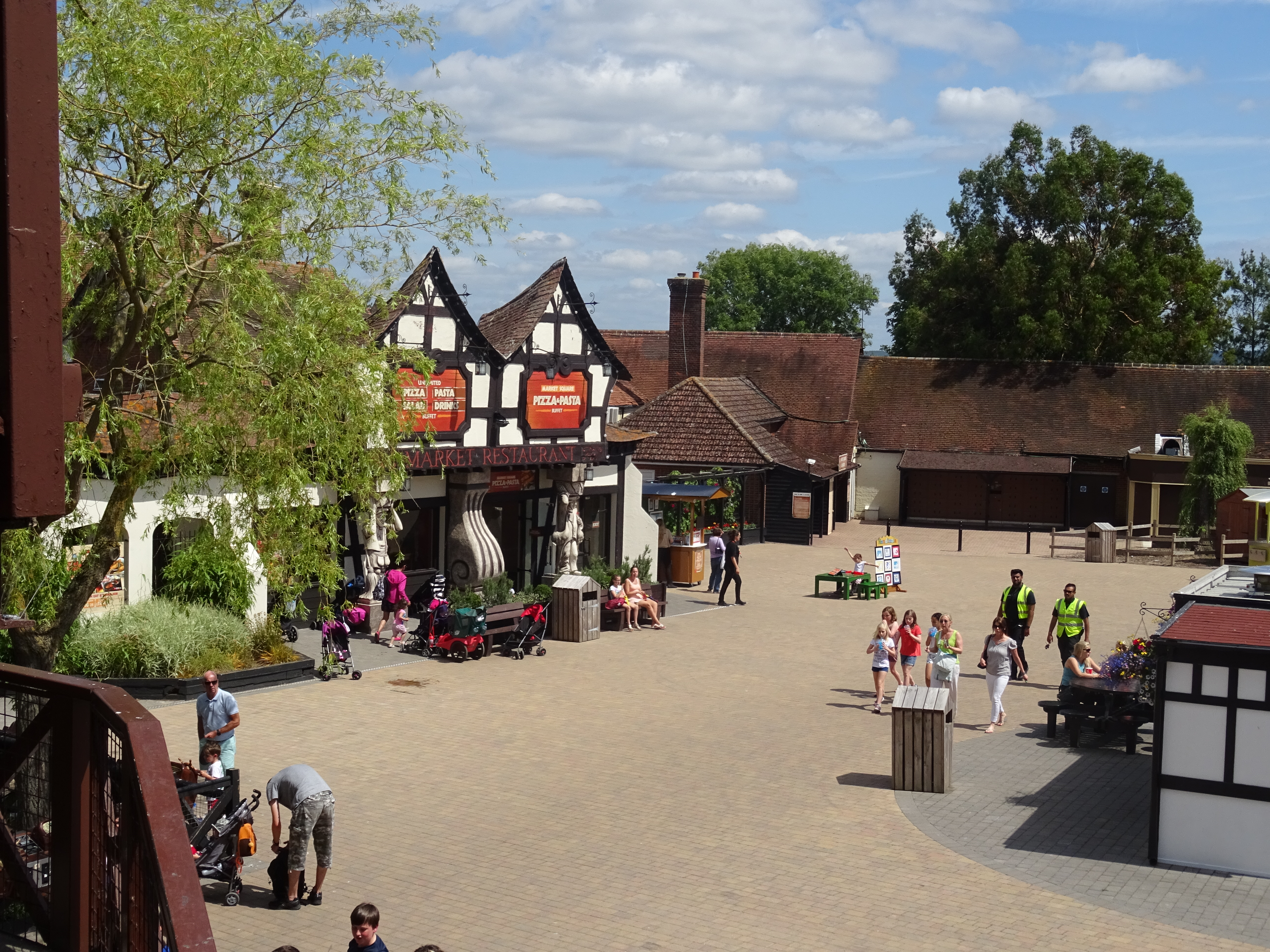
Adventure Point

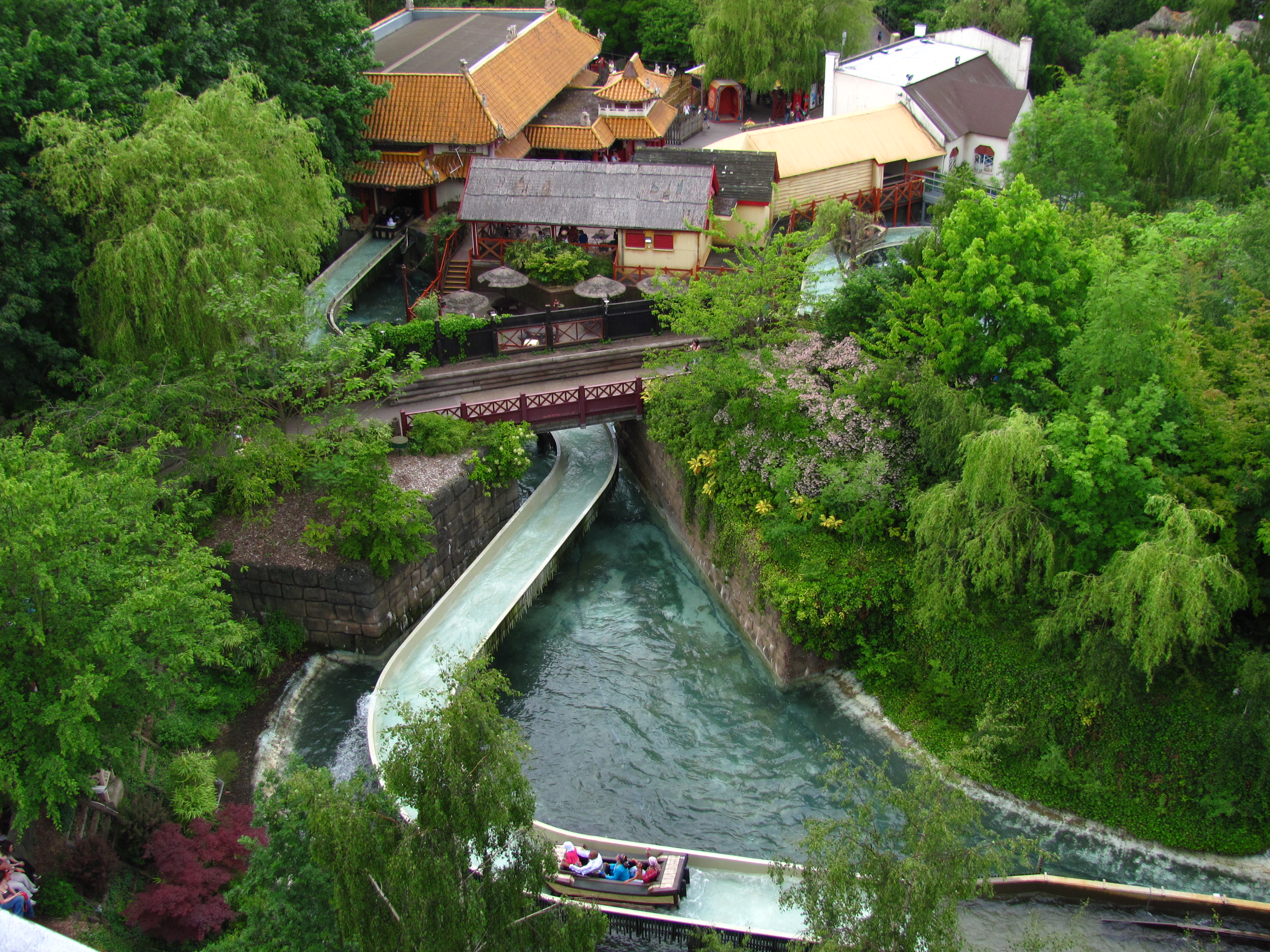
Land of the Tiger

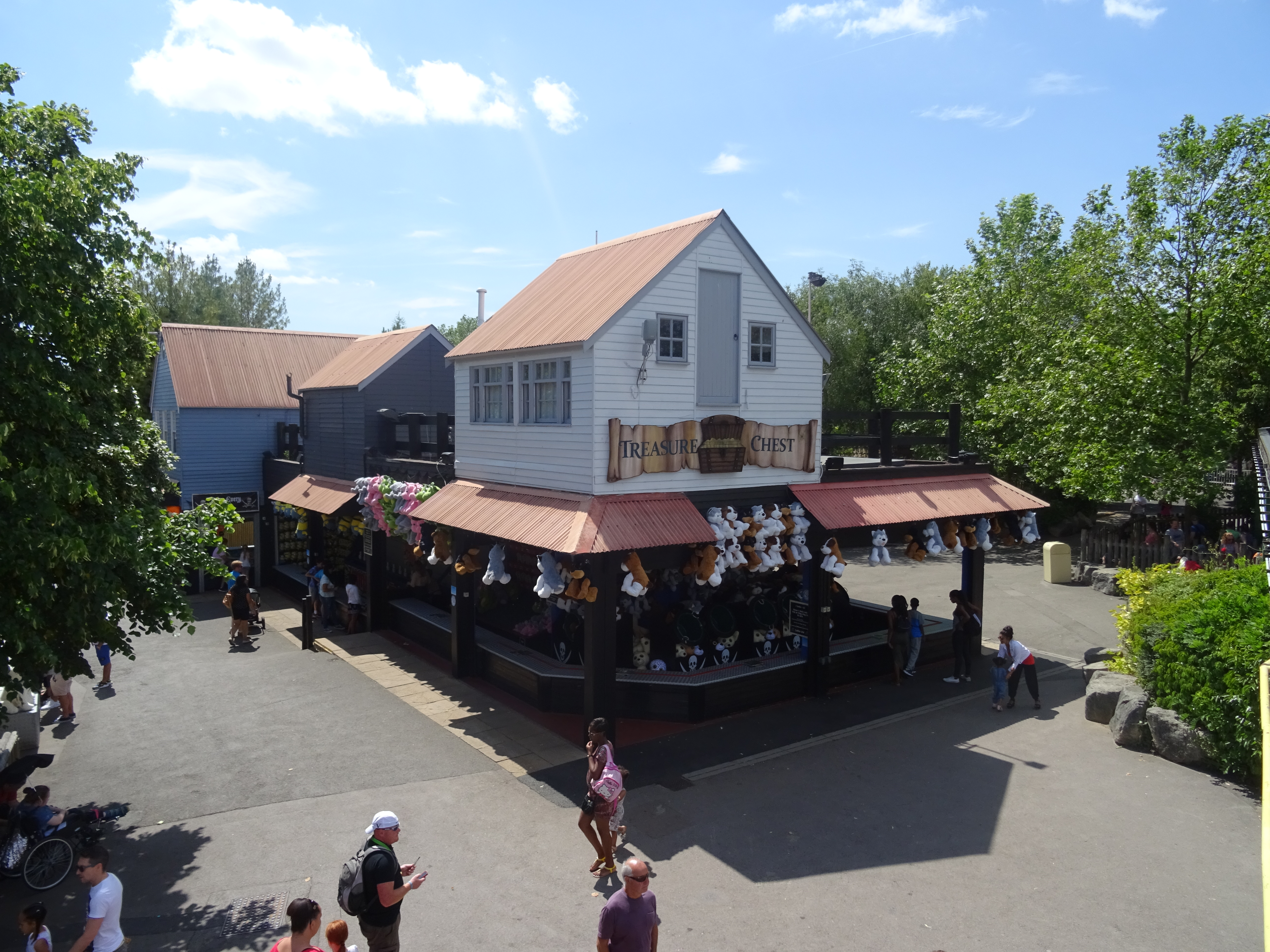
Shipwreck Coast

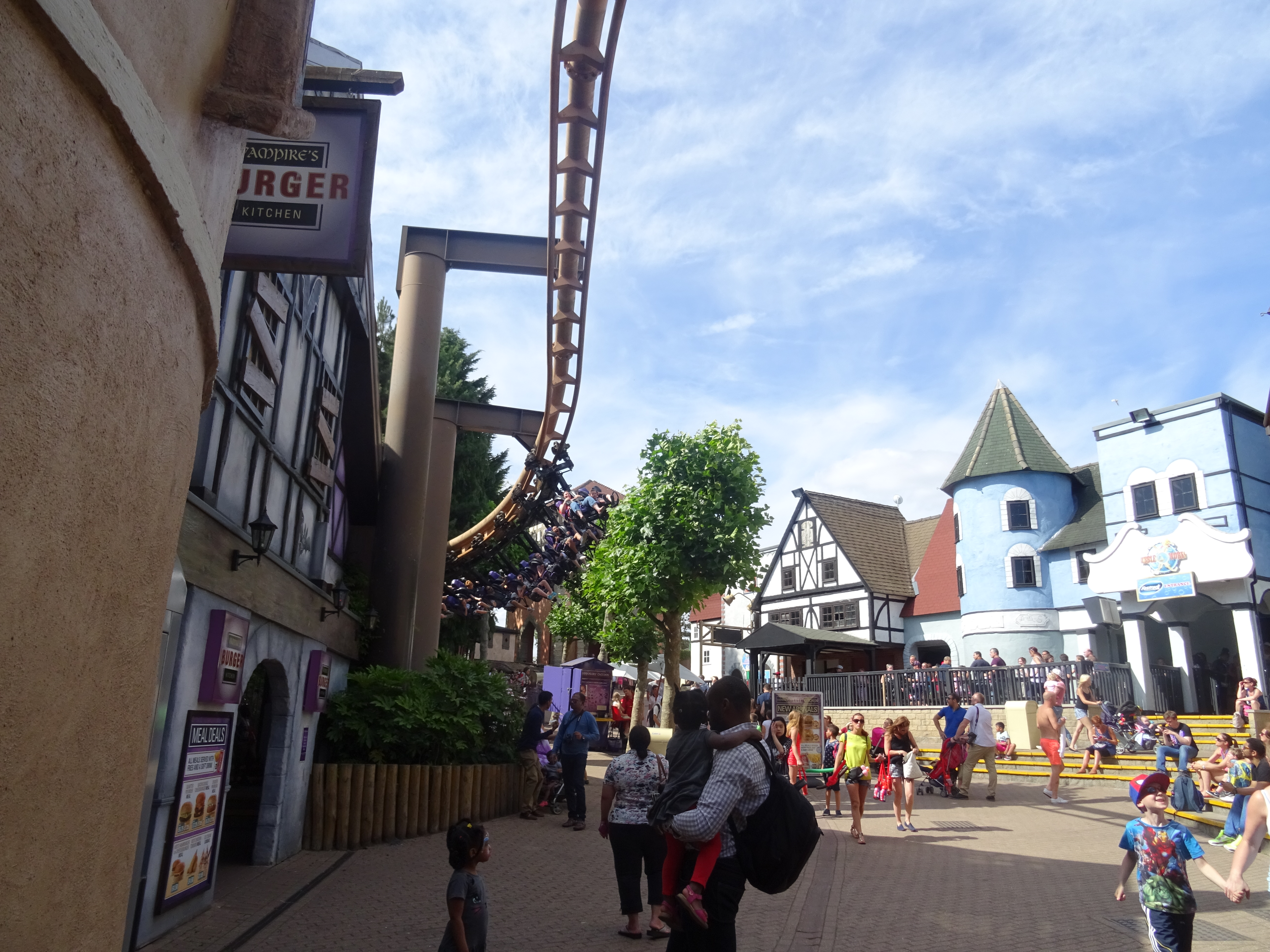
Wild Woods

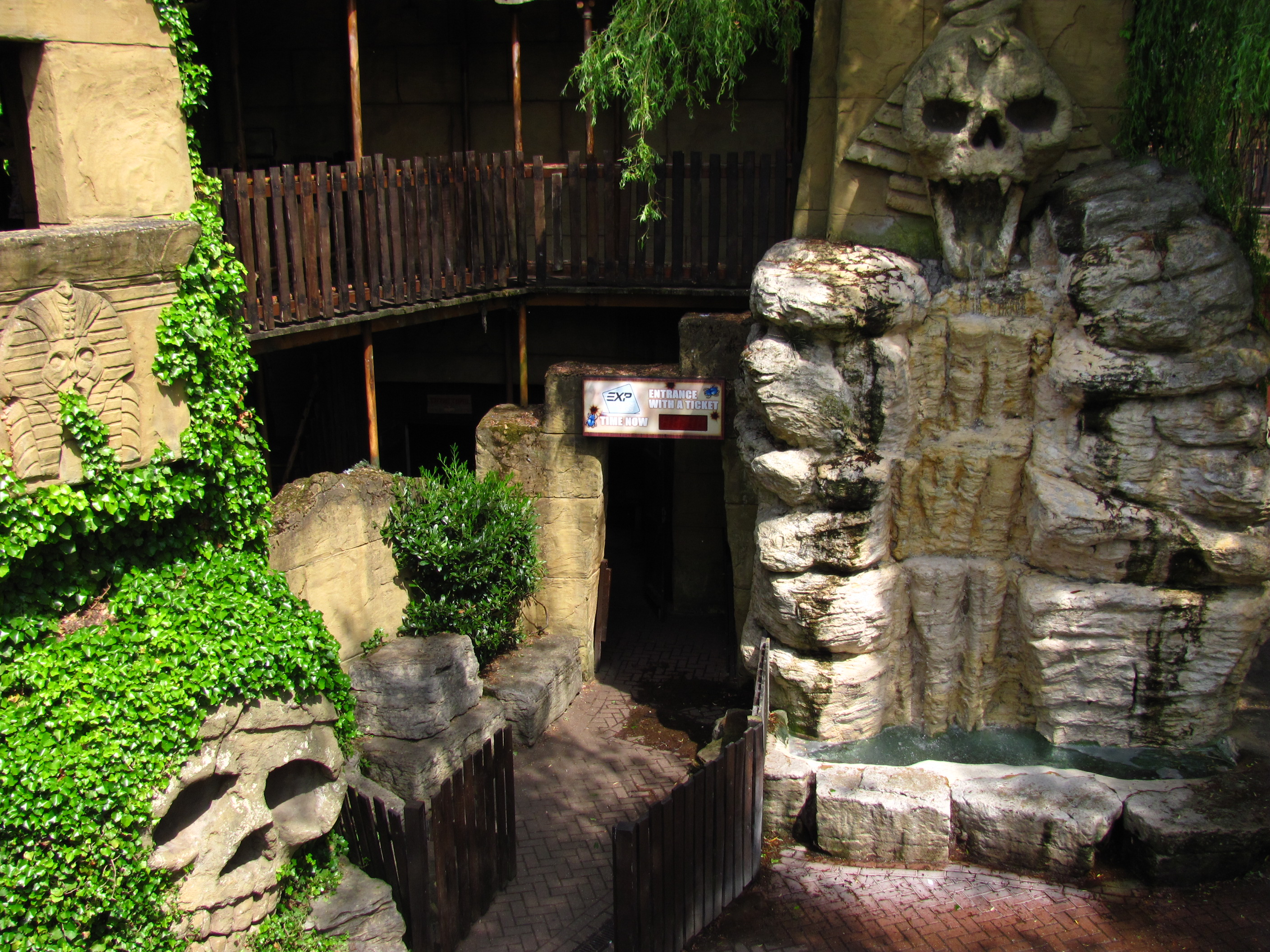
Forbidden Kingdom

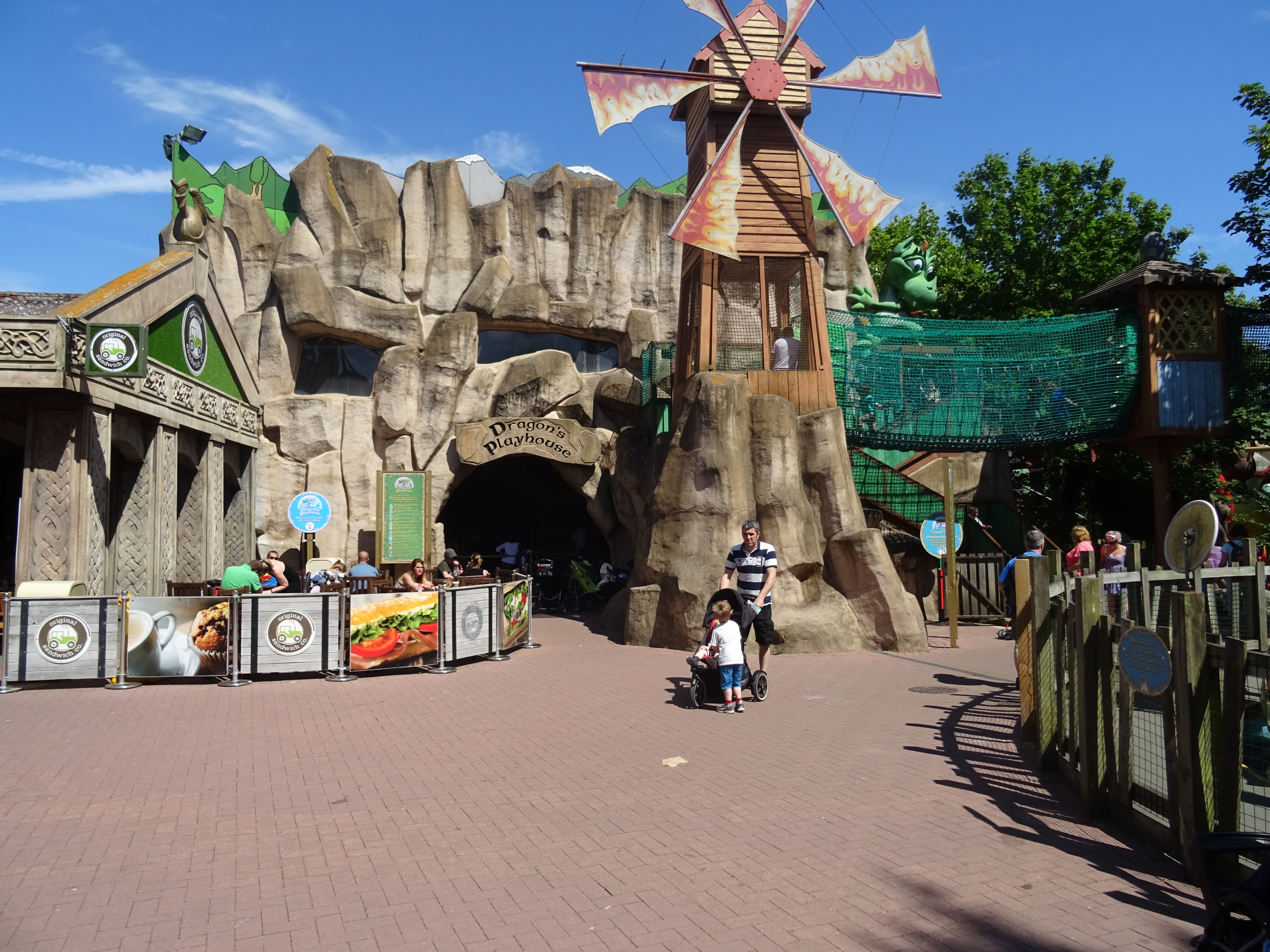
Land of the Dragons

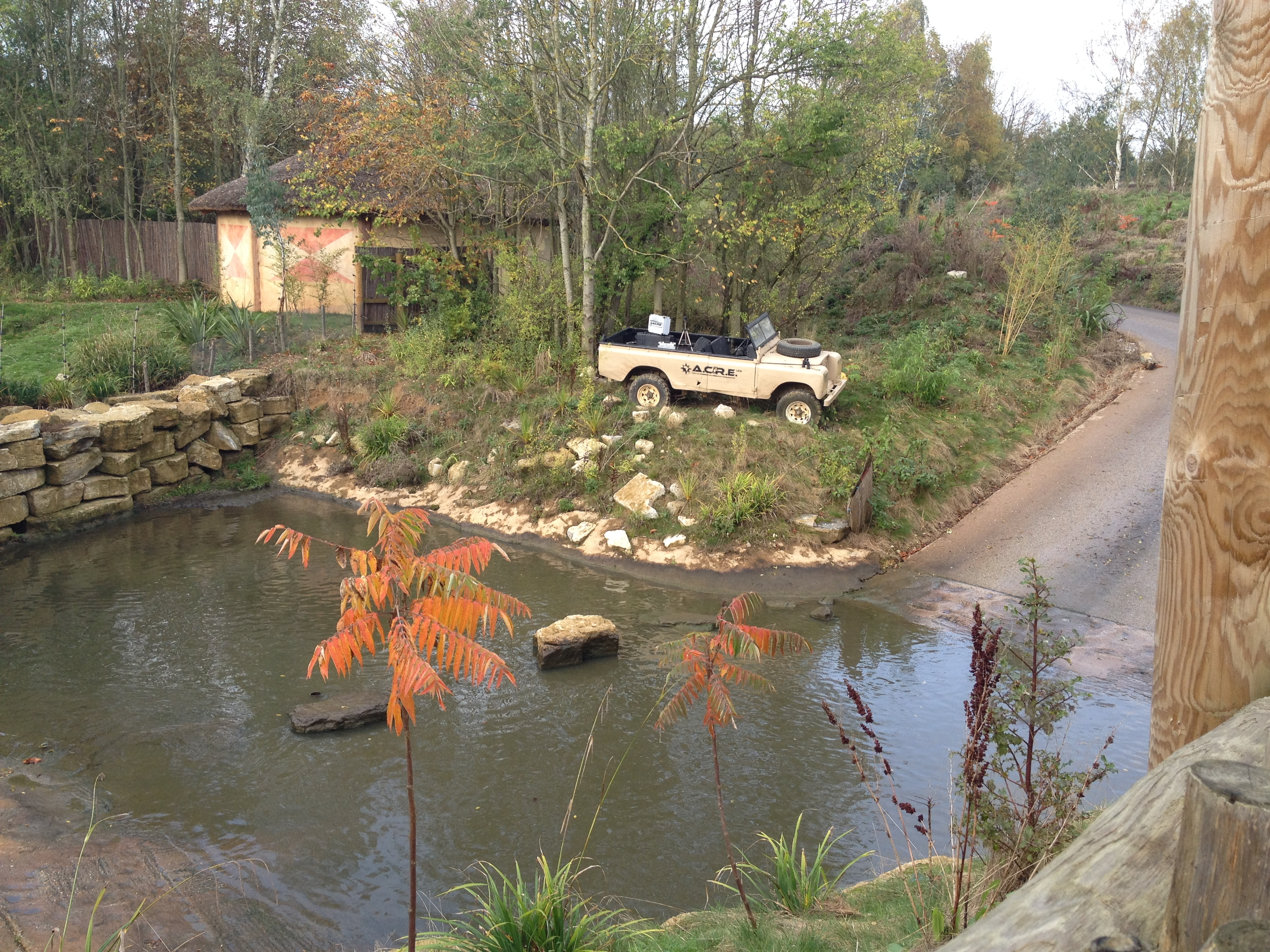
Wanyama Village & Reserve

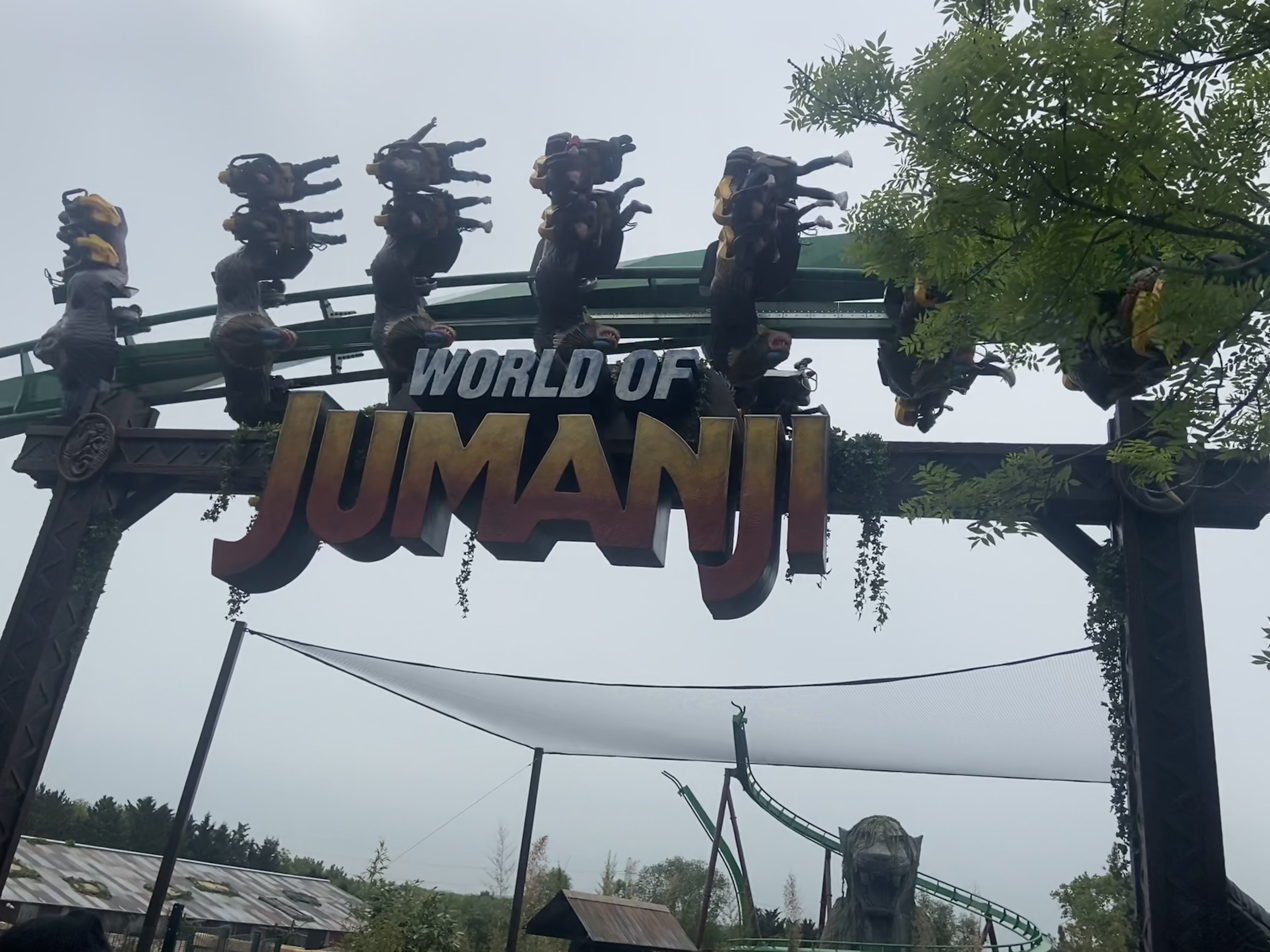
World of Jumanji

=== Adventure Point ===
Adventure Point is the central area of the park, it features a selection of shops, restaurants, smaller outlets including hotdog and doughnut units and guest services, as well as the Chessington Adventure Tree carousel, which was added in 2017 The area has mostly Tudor and early Georgian architecture, featuring details such as hanging baskets and boxed plants. Rides include Tiny Truckers and Elmer's Flying Jumbos. In the centre of Adventure Point is a large compass feature in the ground. The compass points guests in the direction of all the resort locations, it includes: theme park lands, some zoo areas, the Sea Life centre and the hotels. The area was named 'Market Square' until 2017.

=== Shipwreck Coast ===
Shipwreck Coast is an area adjacent to Adventure Point, originally themed to a Cornish fishing village. Rides include the Blue Barnacle, a swinging pirate ship and Seastorm, a circular family boat ride that simulates a sea storm. The area was previously known as Pirates' Cove until the 2022 season, when it received a nautical retheme and overhaul, with the addition of two new attractions. These are Barrel Bail Out, a watermania ride and Trawler Trouble, a Rockin' Tug relocated from Thorpe Park.

=== Land of the Tiger ===
Until the end of the 2017 season named "Mystic East", this is an oriental-themed area built around the Tiger Rock log flume (previously Dragon River).

In July 2017, Chessington filed for planning permission to partially redesign the area to include new tiger enclosures, including walkways over guests' heads, and a new themed feature for the log flume, to be renamed Tiger Rock. The park's ferris wheel Peeking Heights was demolished to make way for the tiger enclosures. The area closed for redevelopment on 10 September 2017, reopened in 2018. The ride has two drops, one with a rock tunnel, the other going through a tiger rock mouth. The area has been re-decorated and re-designed, with a new entrance by Land of the Dragons and Wild Asia.

=== Wild Woods ===
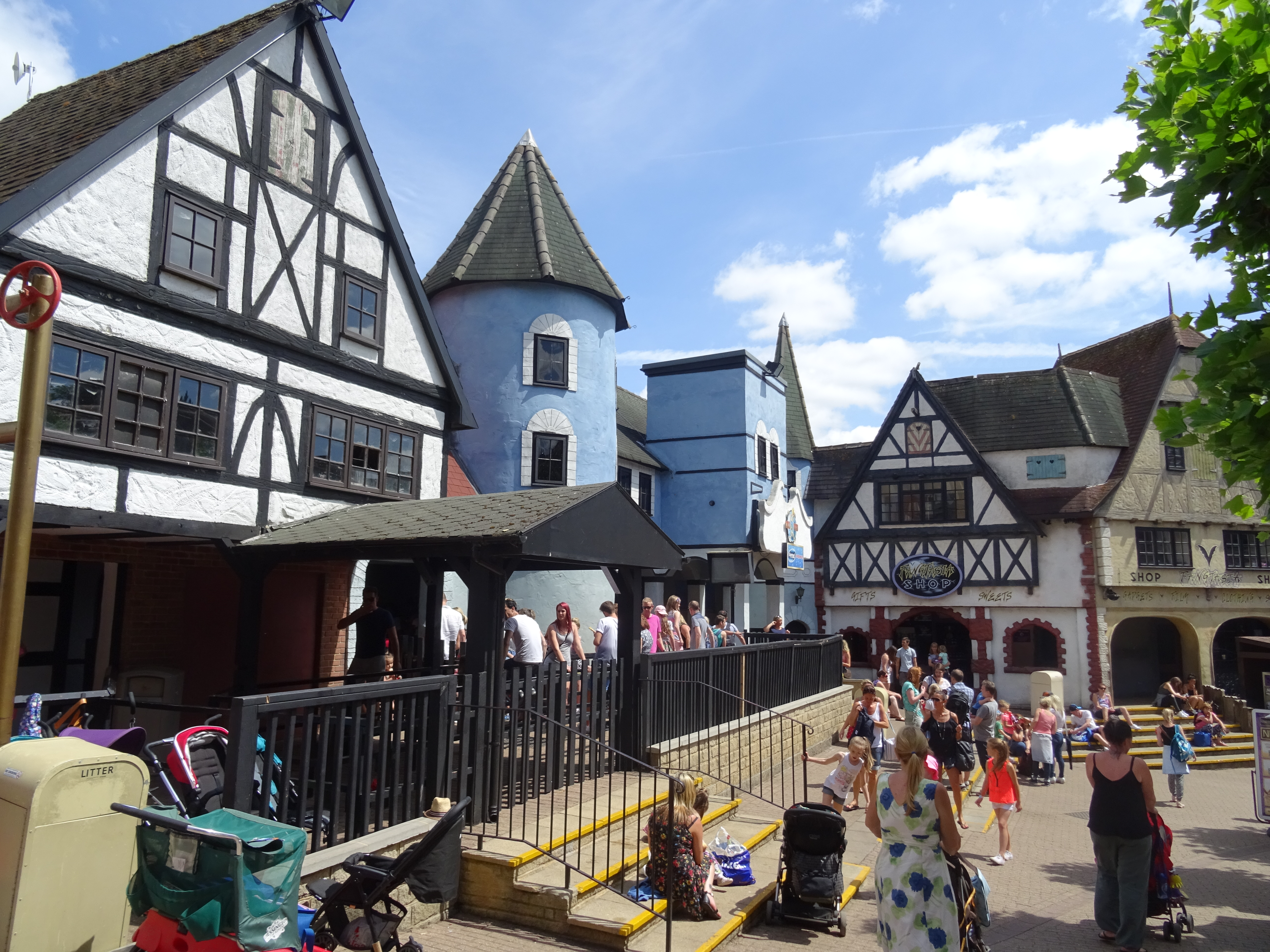
Transylvania shops featuring Bubbleworks

The area, originally named 'Transylvania', was created in 1990, modeled on a mock Bavarian town street, with tall European Architecture. It opened with two major attractions, The Vampire and Prof. Burp's BubbleWorks. Vampire is a steel suspended floorless coaster. The original Arrow Dynamics trains were replaced with Vekoma trains during a closed season in 2001, reopening in 2002. Prof. Burp's BubbleWorks was a dark water ride that took guests through an animated fizzy pop factory. For 2006, it was rethemed to an Imperial Leather toiletries factory. Bubbleworks closed on 6 September 2016 and was replaced by The Gruffalo River Ride Adventure in March 2017.

The area was created as a quaint, 'Central-European' town square to one side, where the entrance to Prof. Burp's BubbleWorks, shops and eateries were located amongst the town buildings, then a path set back from the town leads to the castle entrance of The Vampire. After the park's various changes of management, the area was repeatedly changed in a piecemeal fashion to more of a haunted Halloween style, though most of the fascia remains under various repaints and alterations. Vampire's entrance was moved to an unthemed metal archway in 2001 and the original BubbleWorks entrance recycled as a 'Fastrack' queue in recent years.

In 2017, the park renamed Transylvania to "Wild Woods", in relation to the Gruffalo River Ride Adventure attraction opening that year, though the area itself was largely unchanged.

=== Forbidden Kingdom ===
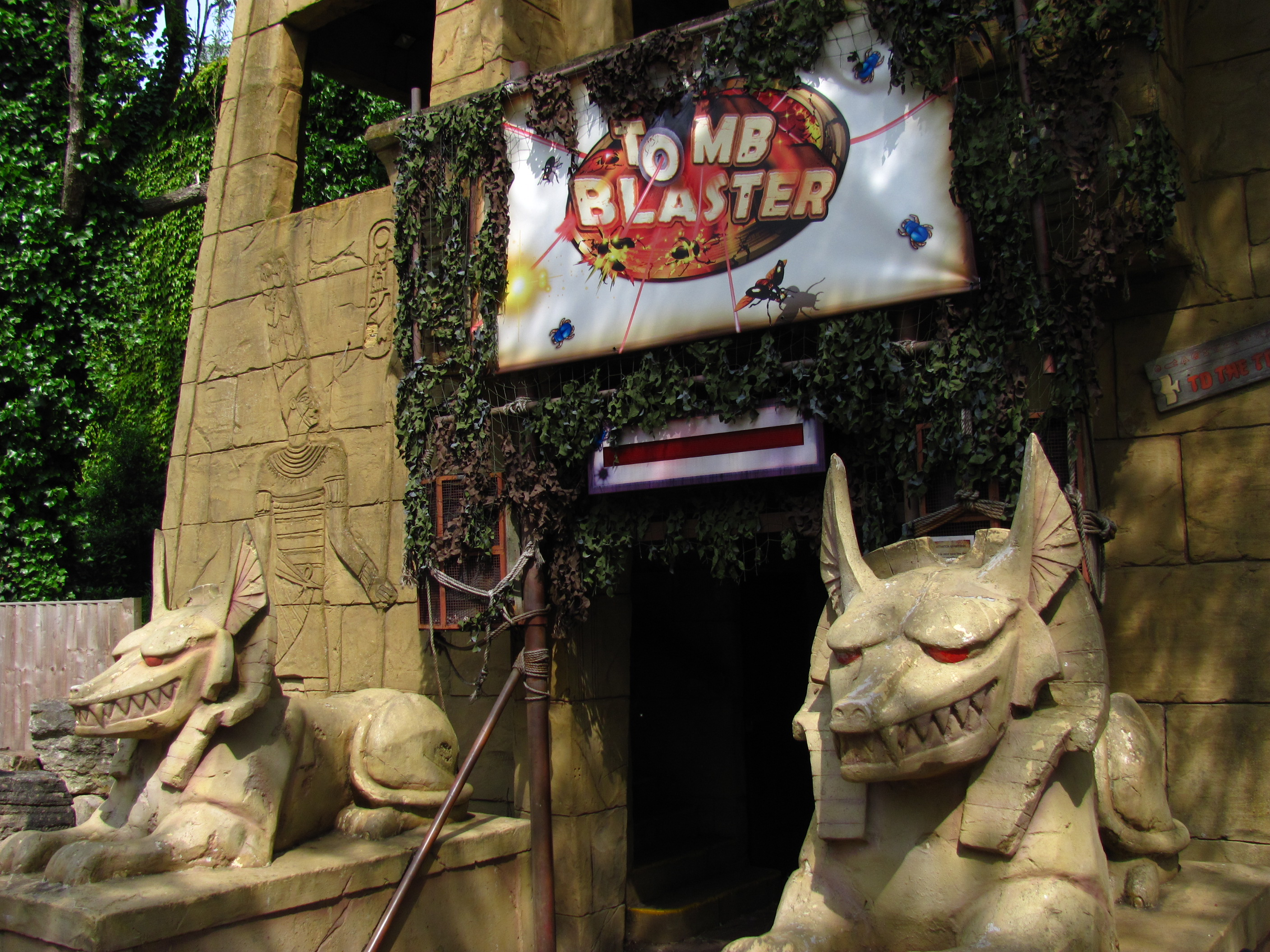
Tomb Blaster

An Ancient Egyptian area, Forbidden Kingdom was created in 1994 originally opening with the Terror Tomb dark ride. Currently, it only contains two rides; Tomb Blaster and Croc Drop.

Opening in 2002 Tomb Blaster is a dark ride shoot out game where riders shoot laser guns at targets and is a retheme of the 'Terror Tomb' dark ride. One side of Forbidden Kingdom is architecturally designed as an Arabic market town, while Tomb Blaster is set in an Ancient Egyptian courtyard tomb area, though much detail has been removed throughout the area over the years.

The second attraction located in Forbidden Kingdom is a brand new family drop tower Croc Drop. The ride opened as a replacement to Rameses Revenge in March 2021, and is themed around the Egyptian crocodile god Sobek. The ride's slogan is, "Brave the drop, release the curse!".

Rattlesnake is a steel sit-down Wild Mouse roller coaster that opened in 1998 in the former Mexicana area. In 2026, due to the redevelopment of most of Mexicana as World of Paw Patrol, the ride was reclassified under the adjacent Forbidden Kingdom area.

=== Land of the Dragons ===
Land of the Dragons is a fantasy dragon themed area for young children. It opened in 2004 and has small children's attractions, as well as the family spinning roller coaster Dragon's Fury. There are two play areas in the land: Dragon's Playhouse, a large soft play area, and adjacent to this is Canopy Capers, an outdoor treehouse rope bridge attraction. Griffin's Galleon is a Kontiki rock'n'tug ride and Sea Dragons is a spinning boat ride.

=== Rainforest ===
Rainforest is a small area aimed at families. Its architecture is recycled from the previous "Toytown" theme, with the original caricatured buildings redressed as African huts. Its previous name "Africa" has been home of the Madagascar franchise since opening in 2012. In 2020 it was refurbished as The Rainforest with a new mini log flume, River Rafts, relocated from Weymouth Sea Life Centre.

=== Wanyama Village & Reserve ===
Wanyama Village & Reserve is Chessington's African area in the form of a large animal reserve. It has ZUFARI – Ride into Africa! as the key attraction, a safari truck adventure through an undiscovered area of Africa. Making up part of the ZUFARI landscape is the Wanayama Village and Reserve, an African themed area of the zoo. The ZUFARI field and Wanyama Reserve are used as a backdrop to the Safari Hotel. ZUFARI's total size is 22 acres and has flamingos, giraffe, ostrich, Nile lechwe, white rhino, Grevy's zebra, scimitar horned oryx and sitatungas. Along the pathways of Zufari are various African-style paintings on fences. In the centre of the Wanyama section of ZUFARI is a large faux-stone carving of a lion. A winding waterfall runs along its side. The area's name was changed in 2020 from ZUFARI to Wanyama Village & Reserve.

=== World of Jumanji ===
World of Jumanji is an area themed to the franchise of the same name, that opened on 15 May 2023, becoming Chessington's 11th themed area. The area features a B&M family compact Shuttle roller coaster, Mandrill Mayhem and two SBF Visa Group attractions, Mamba Strike and Ostrich Stampede. As well as three rides, the area features extensive theming, immersive 'carnival style' games, themed food and retail experiences, and finally play equipment and a treasure hunt around the area.

=== World of Paw Patrol ===
World of Paw Patrol is a area themed to the series of the same name, that opened on 3 May 2026, as Chessington's 12th themed area. It replaced Scorpion Express that closed in 2022. The area features two Zierer rides and two Zamperla rides. Zuma's Hovercraft Adventure is a drifter ride which is the first of its kind in the UK, Marshall's Firetruck Rescue is a bus ride that was originally located at Beanoland and Wild Asia from 2001 to 2024 where it operated as Bash Street Bus and Jungle Bus, Skye's Helicopter Heroes is a helicopter ride, and Chase's Mountain Mission is a kiddie roller coaster which is the main attraction of the area.

=== Operating season ===
The operating season usually starts around mid March and runs until the start of November. Chessington also opens around Christmas holidays and the February half terms for certain events, which include opening up some selective rides for those events.

== Zoo ==
In 1931, Reginald Stuart Goddard opened the Chessington Zoo. In 1946 when Goddard died, the Pearson Publishing Company took over the zoo and managed it until 1978, when The Tussauds Group took control of the park. A number of animals were moved to other zoos during the construction of the theme park. In 1990 the polar bears left the park, as did the hippos and elephants in 1993. In 1994 the snow leopards were relocated to the lion and tiger area. For a time the attraction was called Animal Land, before returning to Chessington Zoo in 2007.

The zoo is generally open simultaneously with the theme park, but also remains open over the winter when the theme park is closed. Zoo entrance is included with the standard ticket price.

As of 2015 the zoo has over 1,000 animals, many of which are endangered and some being extinct in the wild. Chessington Zoo is split up into different areas and walkthroughs. The rhea, mara, wallabies, meerkats and agouti were previously the Monkey Walk area. Monkey Walk was replaced by Creatures Features which in turn was later replaced by the Wanyama Village in 2010. There was also a Children's Zoo, which opened in 2008 and sponsored by the YooHoo & Friends franchise from 2014 until its closure in 2024. Children may feed domestic farm animals such as pygmy goats, rabbits, ferrets, sheep, guinea pigs, Kunekune pigs, and donkeys.

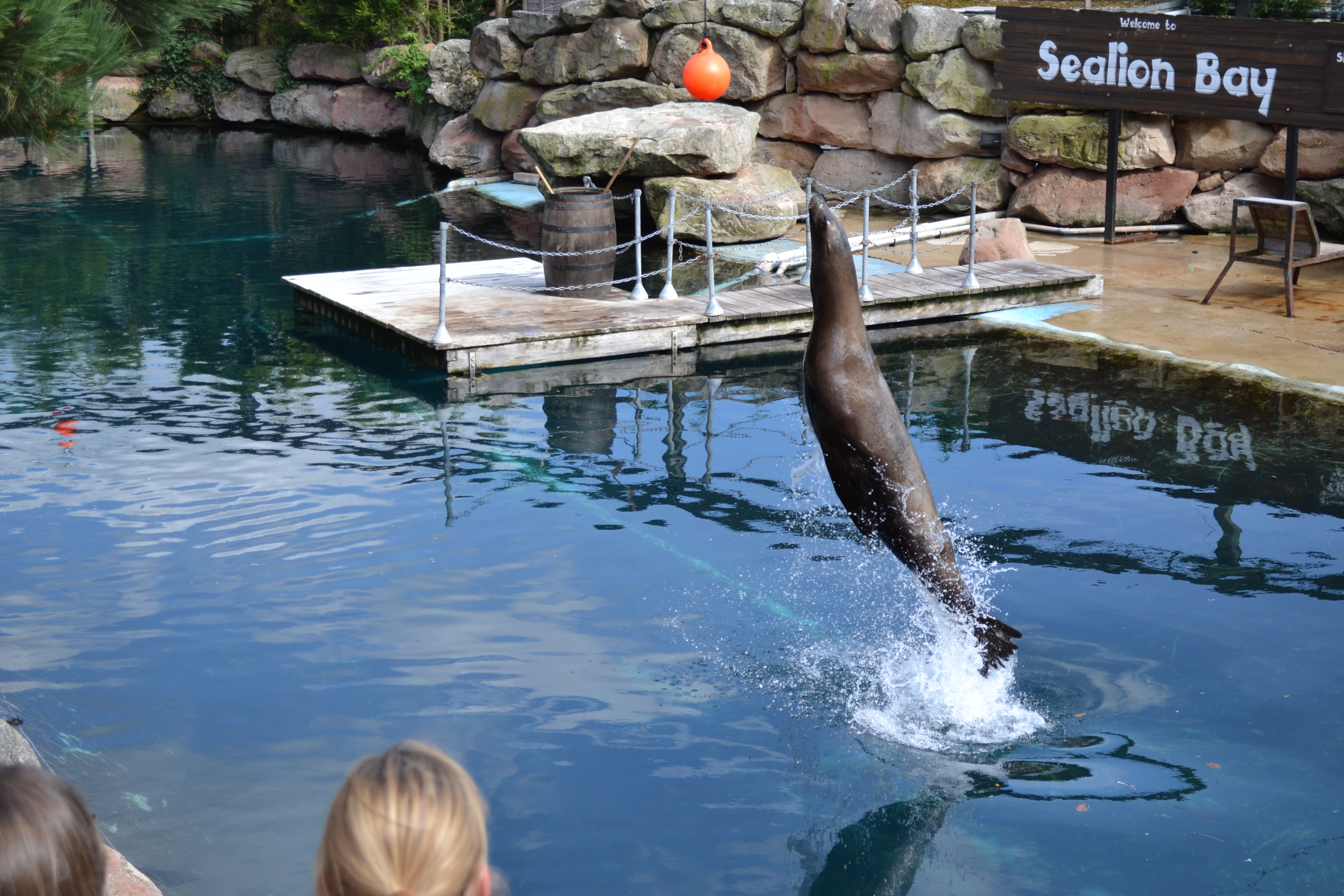
A view of the sea lions in Sealion Bay

The Safari Skyway, an elevated monorail with an entrance in the Market Square theme park area, takes riders around various animal enclosures at the zoo. The ride closed in 2015 due to cost of continued maintenance. An animal presentation in front of the Burnt Stub Mansion hosts the Animal Antics show at different times throughout the day. Near the entrance to the Zoo, there are enclosures for otters and reindeer. Chessington Zoo also has an area called Sealion Bay, which features sea lion presentations several times a day.

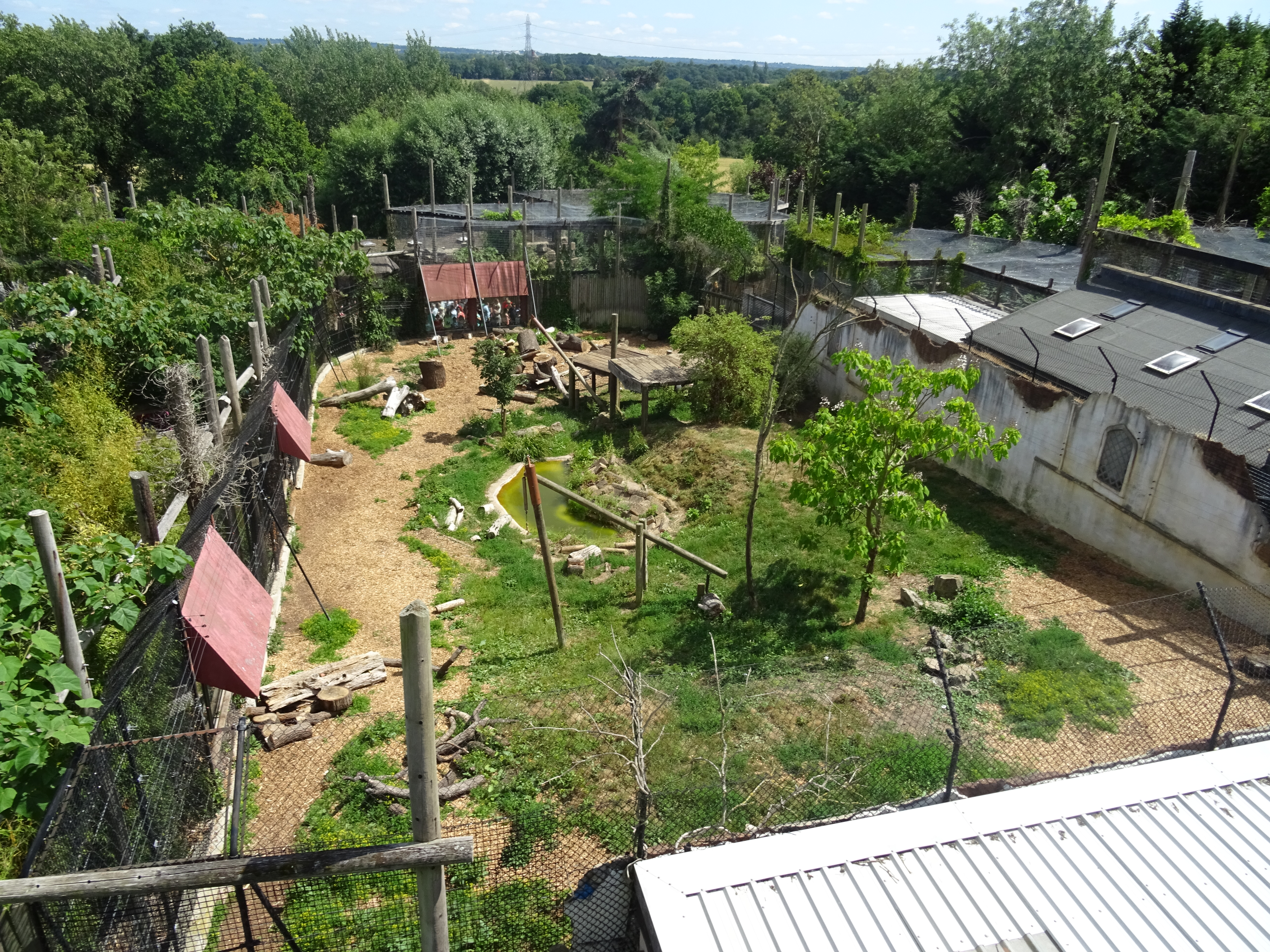
Lion enclosure in Trail of the Kings

The Trails of the Kings; a walkthrough attraction home to enclosures for western lowland gorillas, Asiatic lions, fossa, Carpathian lynx, and binturong. In 2007 the Trail of the Kings section of the zoo underwent an inspection with the outcome that the gorilla enclosure was too small. A bigger building for the gorillas was completed in 2010. As of 2013, there are 10 gorillas at Chessington, as well as two infants born in 2012.

The Wanyama Village & Reserve opened in late May 2010, in an area behind the Safari Hotel and houses animals such as Grévy's zebra, sitatunga antelope, ostrich, dorcas gazelle, Nile lechwe, fennec fox, dwarf mongoose, southern ground hornbill, Kirk's dik-dik, Aloatran gentle lemur, black-cheeked lovebird, crested porcupine, meerkats, scimitar horned oryx, common eland and Ankole cattle. It is part of the ZUFARI animal reserve. The area is open to guests staying in the Safari Hotel during the evening. The Children's Zoo animals moved here after its closure in 2024.

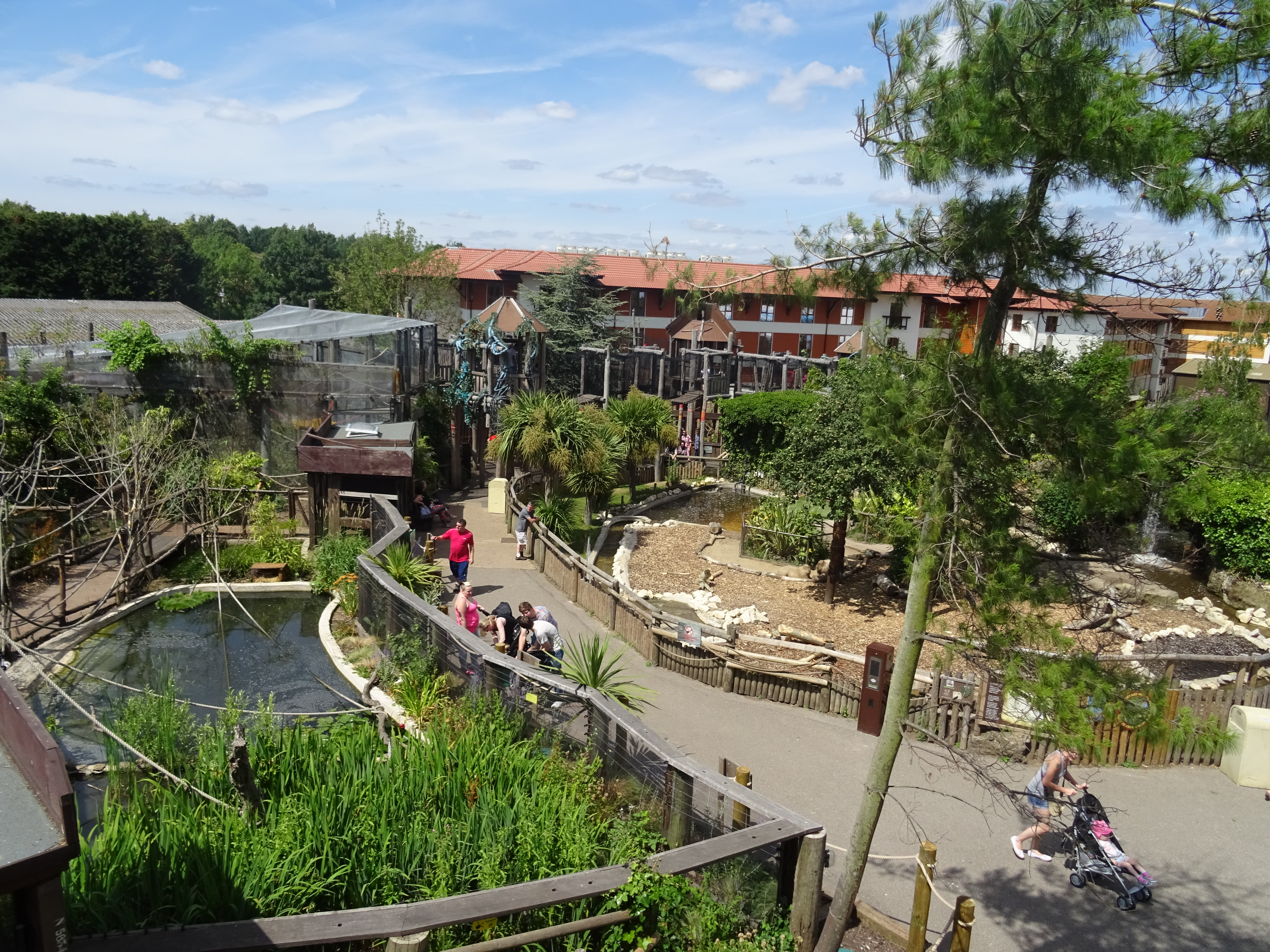
Amazu with Azteca Hotel behind

The AMAZU Treetop Adventure opened in April 2014 on the former site of the Monkey & Bird Garden. The area features adventure trail walkways, play areas and Aztec theming. The area has spider monkeys, saki monkeys, red-handed tamarins, golden-headed lion tamarins, Bolivian squirrel monkeys, Geoffroy marmosets, capybara, military macaws, Ecuadorian red-lored amazons, giant wood rail, agouti and three-banded armadillo. The animals in the area can either be viewed on ground or through the Amazu raised walkways, some of which, go through the enclosures.

Penguin Bay is a new area that opened in March 2015 as part of the Year of the Penguins. It features the long time residents of Chessington Zoo Humboldt penguins in a beach themed area. Seating for the demonstrations is aboard a shipwreck with a canopy. The new enclosure features glass walls to allow for better public viewing.

=== Chessington Sea Life Centre ===
In 2008, Chessington Zoo opened Chessington Sea Life Centre on the site of the old children's Zoo, as an attempt to both determine if the park had a positive future and also to attract more multi-day visits. The Sea Life Centre, which is part of a franchise operated by Merlin Entertainments, has a number of exhibits including a Ray Pool and a touch pool. The Sea Life Centre is split into four areas: Our Shoreline, The Reef, Amazonia and Azteca which features the signature Ocean Tunnel.

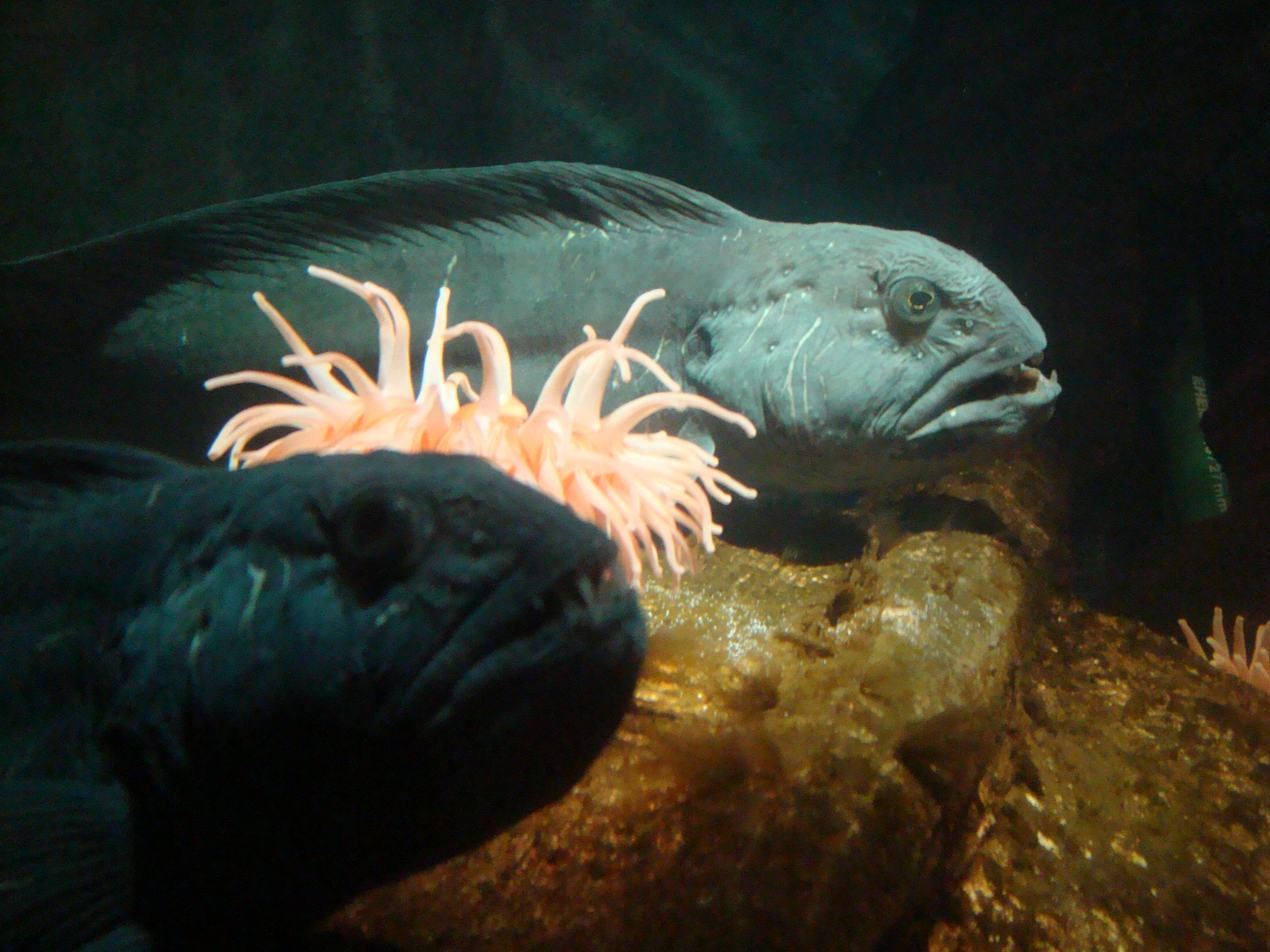
Northern wolf fish in Azteca

"Our Shoreline" is the oldest area and has sea creatures found on the coast of Britain, featuring rays, seahorses and starfish. The area also has smaller exhibits including clownfish and crabs. The Touch Pool is also found here, in the centre of the area. The following area is named "The Reef", which features clownfish, cleaner shrimp, regal tang, slipper lobster and upside-down jellyfish

Next to this area is Amazonia, which opened in 2009. It is a slightly smaller version of the same exhibit that has appeared at other Sea Life Centres. It includes red-bellied piranhas, common octopus, tetras and other, smaller exhibits.

Azteca opened in 2011, it features a 10-meter Ocean Tunnel, which has sea creatures including: bonnethead sharks, lion fish, starry pufferfish, surgeon fish, angle fish, catshark and epaulette shark. The tunnel existed before the 2011 addition but was redeveloped for the arrival of new fish. Aside from the Ocean Tunnel, Azteca also has jellyfish, seahorse and northern wolffish. The placement of the area has resulted in the division of the Our Shoreline area, which is now separated into two areas.

== Accommodation ==
Currently, Chessington World of Adventures operate one on-site hotel. They will soon open a Minecraft World Hotel that will replace the closed Azteca Hotel.

=== Safari Hotel ===
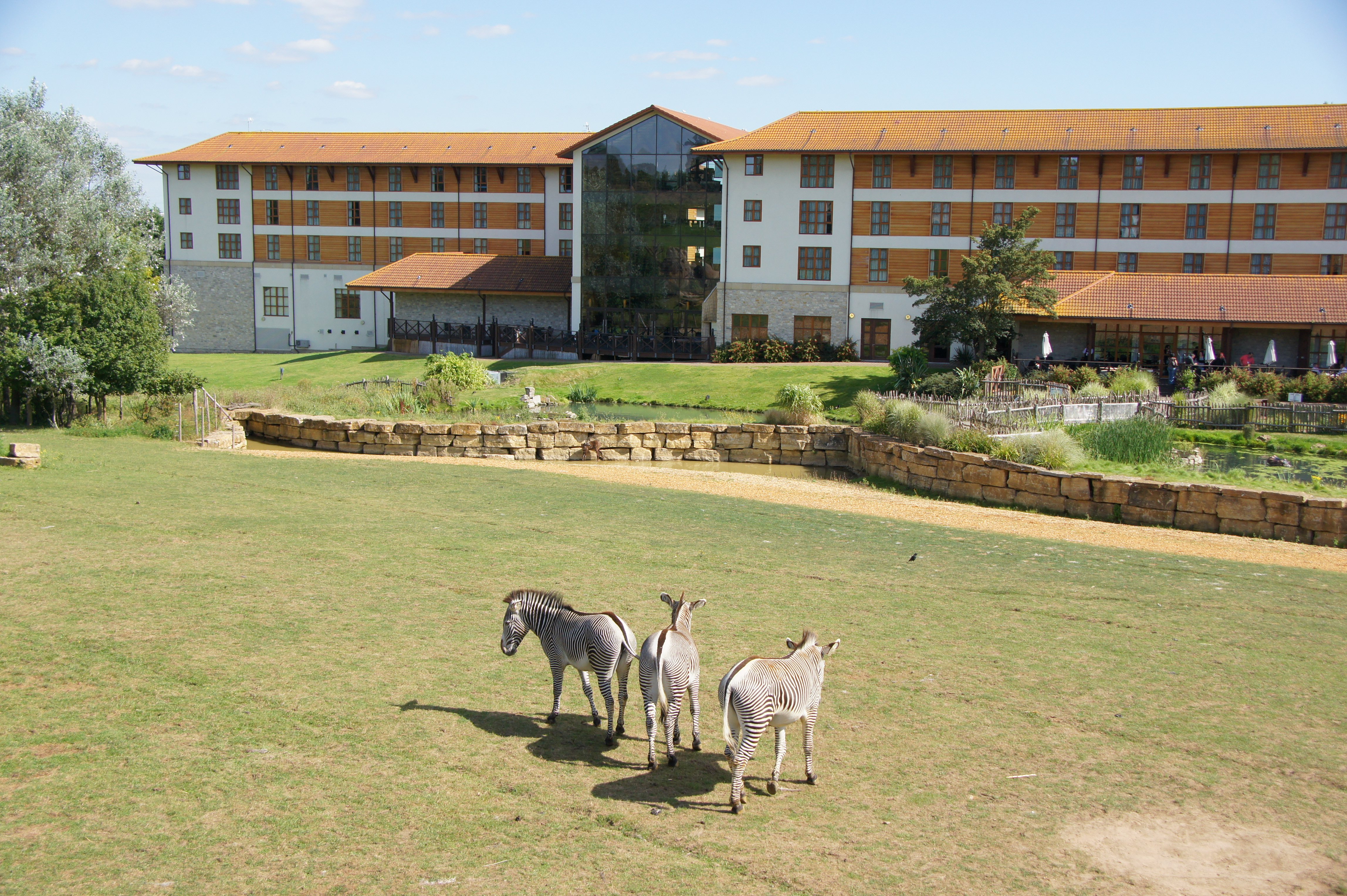
Safari Hotel with Wanyama Reserve in foreground

The Safari Hotel is a four star hotel themed to appear like a Safari Lodge. It was originally named the Safari Lodge Hotel in 2007, before changing to the Chessington Resort Hotel in 2010. The hotel was then refurbished and relaunched for 2014 and has since been known simply as the Safari Hotel.

The hotel opened in June 2007 and was originally operated by Holiday Inn until it was fully taken over by Merlin Entertainments in May 2014. The hotel features various African elements with giraffe sculptures in the foyer and Zafari Bar & Grill. The hotels' check in area features a reptile enclose, which has a variety of animals housed in it depending on the time of year.

When the hotel was integrated as a resort in 2010, the Wanyama Village & Reserve opened with access from the hotel.

=== Azteca Hotel ===
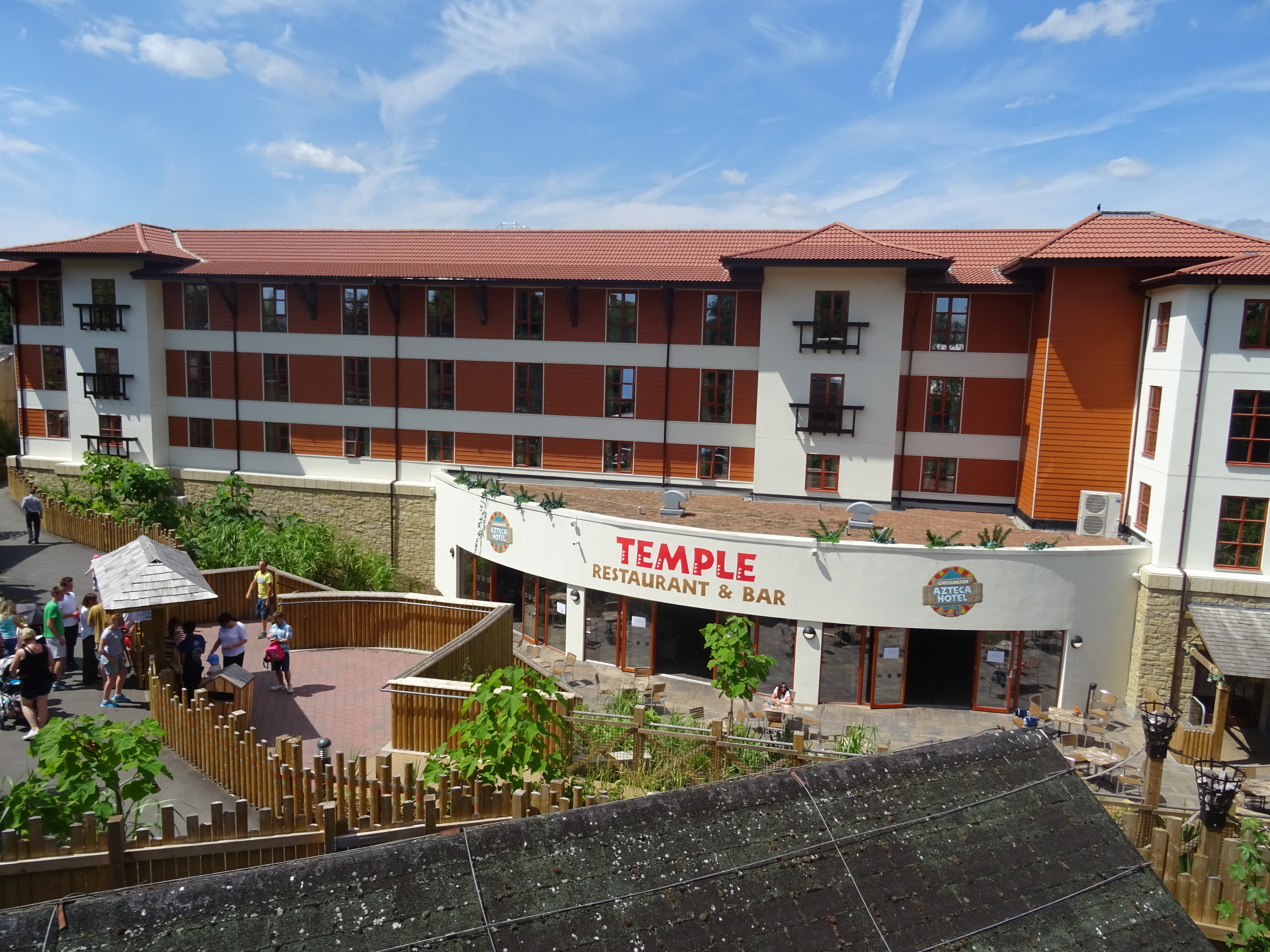
Front of the Azteca Hotel as seen from Safari Skyway

The Azteca Hotel was the newer of the two and opened in 2014. The hotel was four star and themed around an ancient aztec temple. The hotel had three floors, with each floor themed to a different level of the temple. The top floor (named "Temple Summit") was decorated to give the impression that guests are on top of the structure looking out at the wildlife around.

The hotel's Temple Restaurant had a heavy emphasis on special effects, with a large tower sitting in the centre of the room. Every thirty minutes, it would make a display of water fountains, it also featured rapid lighting sequences and ultraviolet markings. Around the perimeter of the former restaurant is a trail of leaf cutter ants which pass the table and at its entrance is a tank of red bellied piranha. Due to the hotel being built partly into the side of a hill, the Temple Restaurant had no windows, and instead has a series of screens built into the walls, showing animated videos of the South American wildlife.

The hotel was linked to the Amazu area of Chessington Zoo, which is also aztec themed. Due to the location of the hotel in relation to the car parks, check in was located in the Safari Hotel.

The Azteca hotel closed on 31 October 2026 for a retheme to the Minecraft franchise

== Incidents and accidents ==
The zoo suffered an escape in December 1931 when two penguins, Bubble and Squeak, escaped the zoo grounds, before being recaptured in the nearby village of Hook, around 2 miles away.

In 1932, a kangaroo was killed after being startled by the appearance of hounds pursuing a hare. Owner Reginald Stuart Goddard accepted a replacement kangaroo. In a separate incident, a Rhesus monkey was at large after escaping its enclosure.

Fire broke out in September 1935, causing the death of five ponies, and one zebra.

The zoo's takings were robbed from safes within the Burnt Stub mansion in August 1953, with the thieves taking around £1,000.

In 1964, a wolf escaped the zoo and was at large outside the grounds, before being shot dead in the grounds of a house near Esher.

April 1965 saw the escape of a jungle cat after a tree fell and broke its enclosure open.

A convicted paedophile was taken on an escorted trip to Chessington in August 1996, and managed to escape his escorts to go on the run, before being recaptured the following week in Worthing, West Sussex.

In June 2012, a four-year-old girl fell 4.2 metres (nearly 14 feet) while in line waiting for a ride. The park was summoned by Health and Safety Executive which claimed a health and safety breach. In the same month, park owner Merlin Entertainments initiated a court case to seek an injunction against Peter Cave, owner of survey consultancy Peer Egerton Limited. The consultancy firm had been hired by Merlin to prepare a report on the safety of the park, after the 2012 accident. Cave's firm found 2,000 defects and potential safety hazards. This led to a dispute between Cave and Merlin, culminating in court proceedings to prevent the park from reopening after its 2012 winter break. Merlin won this case and the park reopened. Cave then set up a campaign to warn the public and staff of the findings, including sending out 80,000 emails. Merlin claimed to have spent the £4.6 million on repairs and improvements that Cave had recommended and named the allegations "baseless". But High Court Judge Elisabeth Laing ruled that the campaign was a "matter of public interest" and refused the injunction to silence Cave.

On the morning of Sunday, 8 November 2026, the park received a bomb threat causing an evacuation of the resort. The park reopened on the following day. The threat was a hoax and there were no injuries reported.

== Green belt restrictions ==
Due to the majority of the theme park being located on green belt lands the park is subject to several restrictions. Most significant are restrictions in height (no building higher than the tree line), noise (with time restrictions) and traffic management.

Various rides have had to have been built in pits due to these restrictions. It is most noticeable on Blue Barnacle, Croc Drop and Rattlesnake. The resort cannot operate Vampire past 11pm. The resort was not allowed to build anything higher than the Peeking Heights Ferris Wheel, which has since been removed from the park.

== Gallery ==
Main gallery: Chessington World of Adventures Resort at WikiCommons

Theme park and features

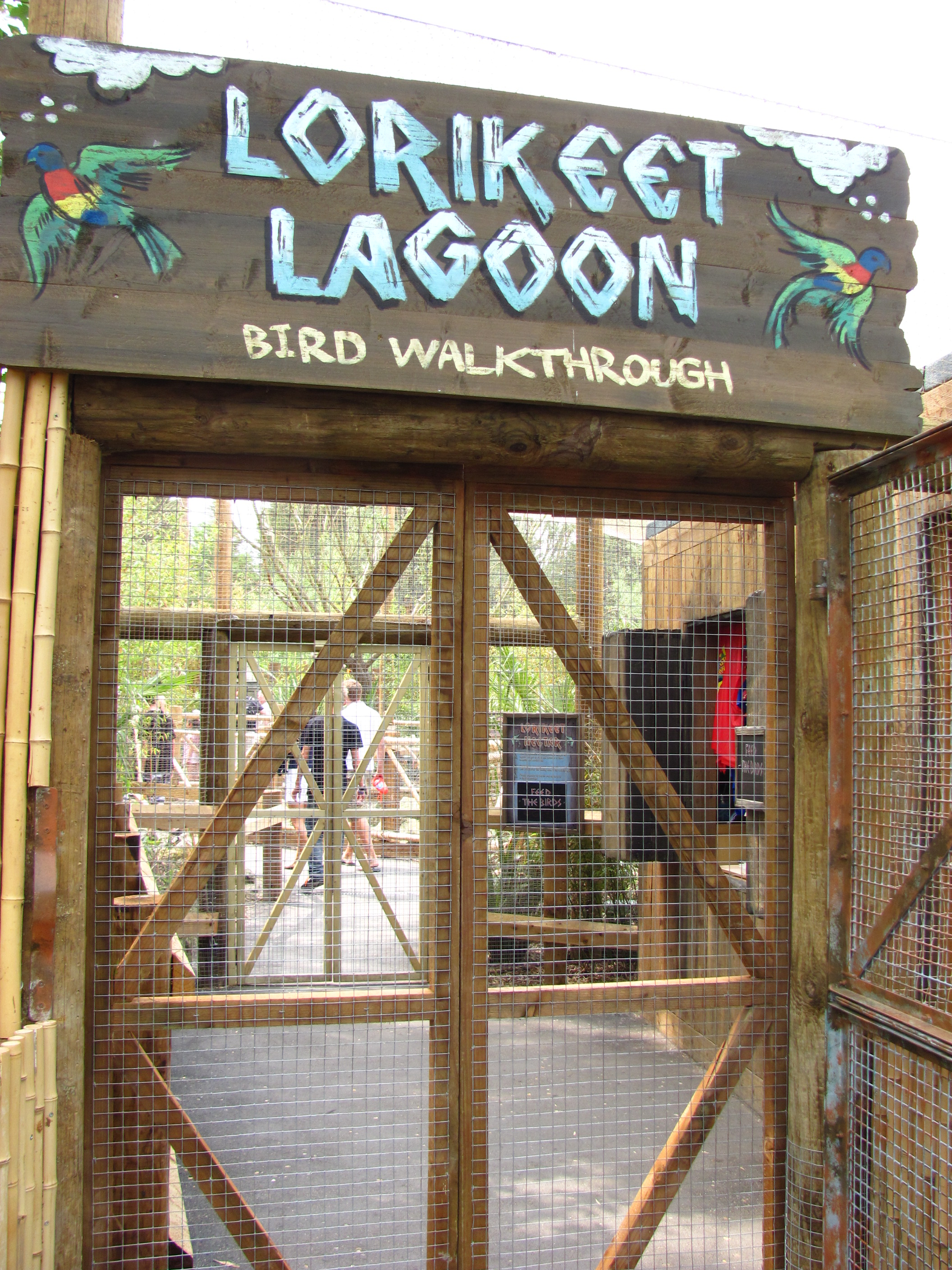
Lorikeet Lagoon in Wild Asia

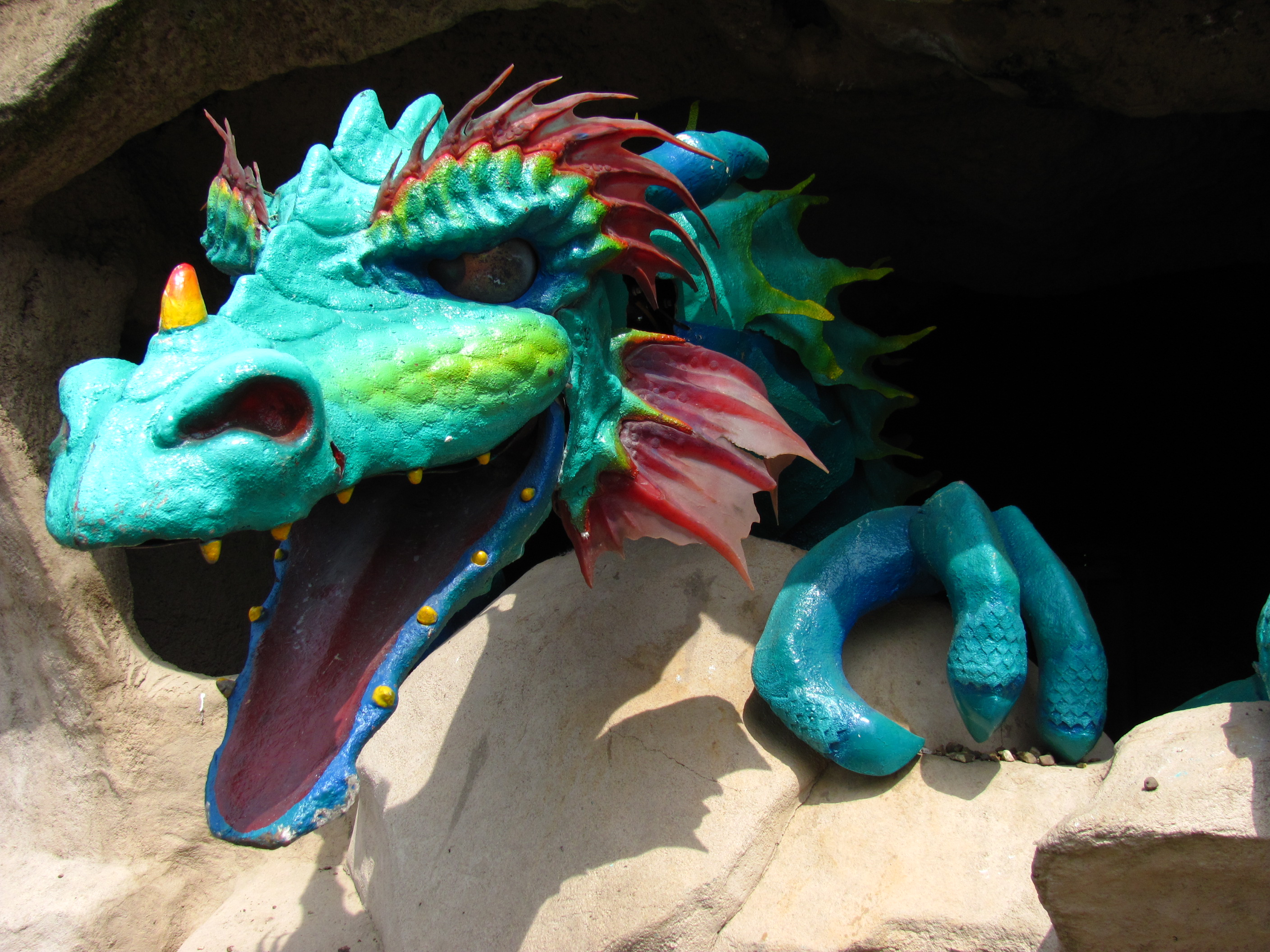
Frazzle the Dragon

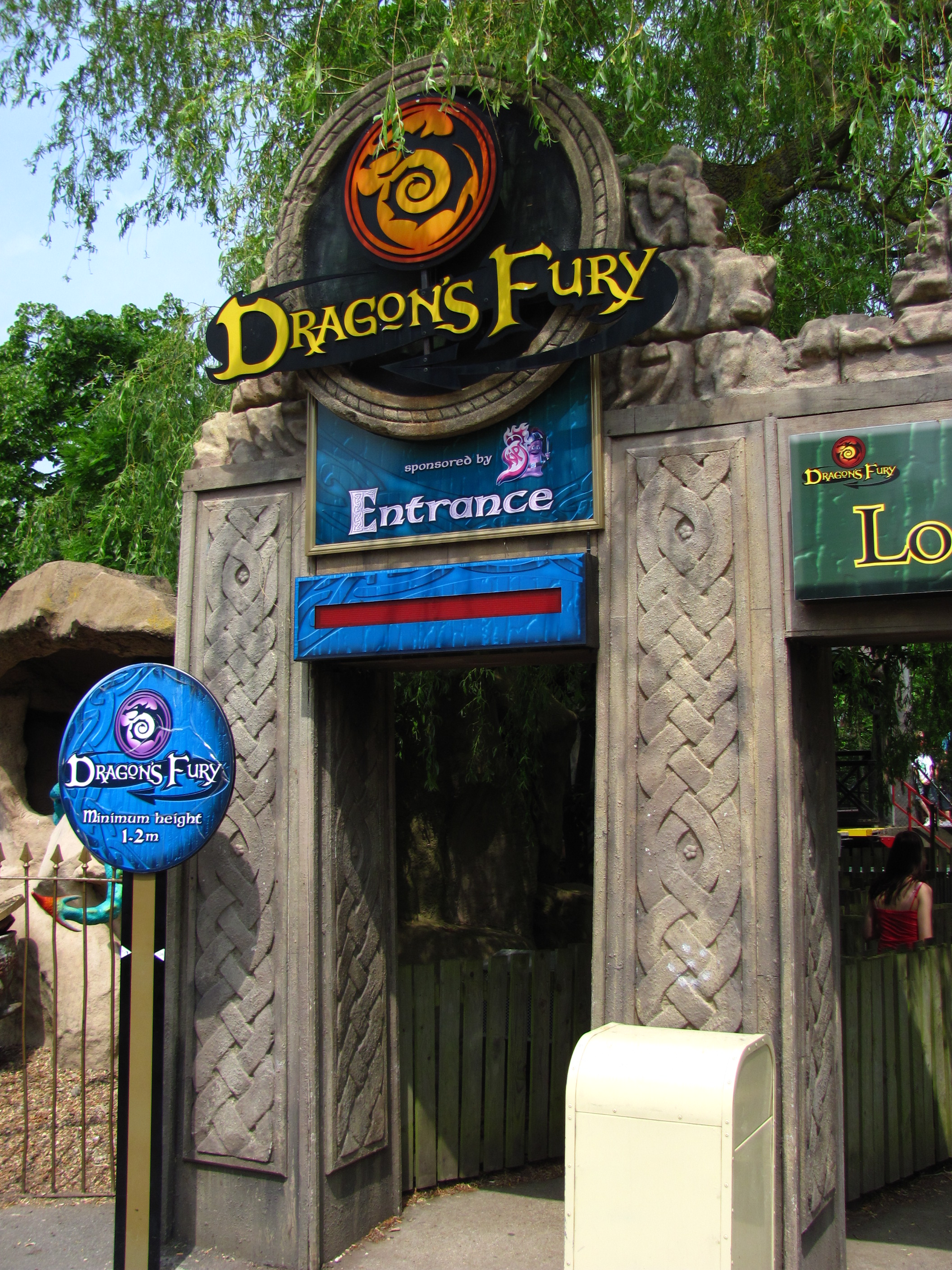
Entrance to Dragon's Fury in Land of the Dragons

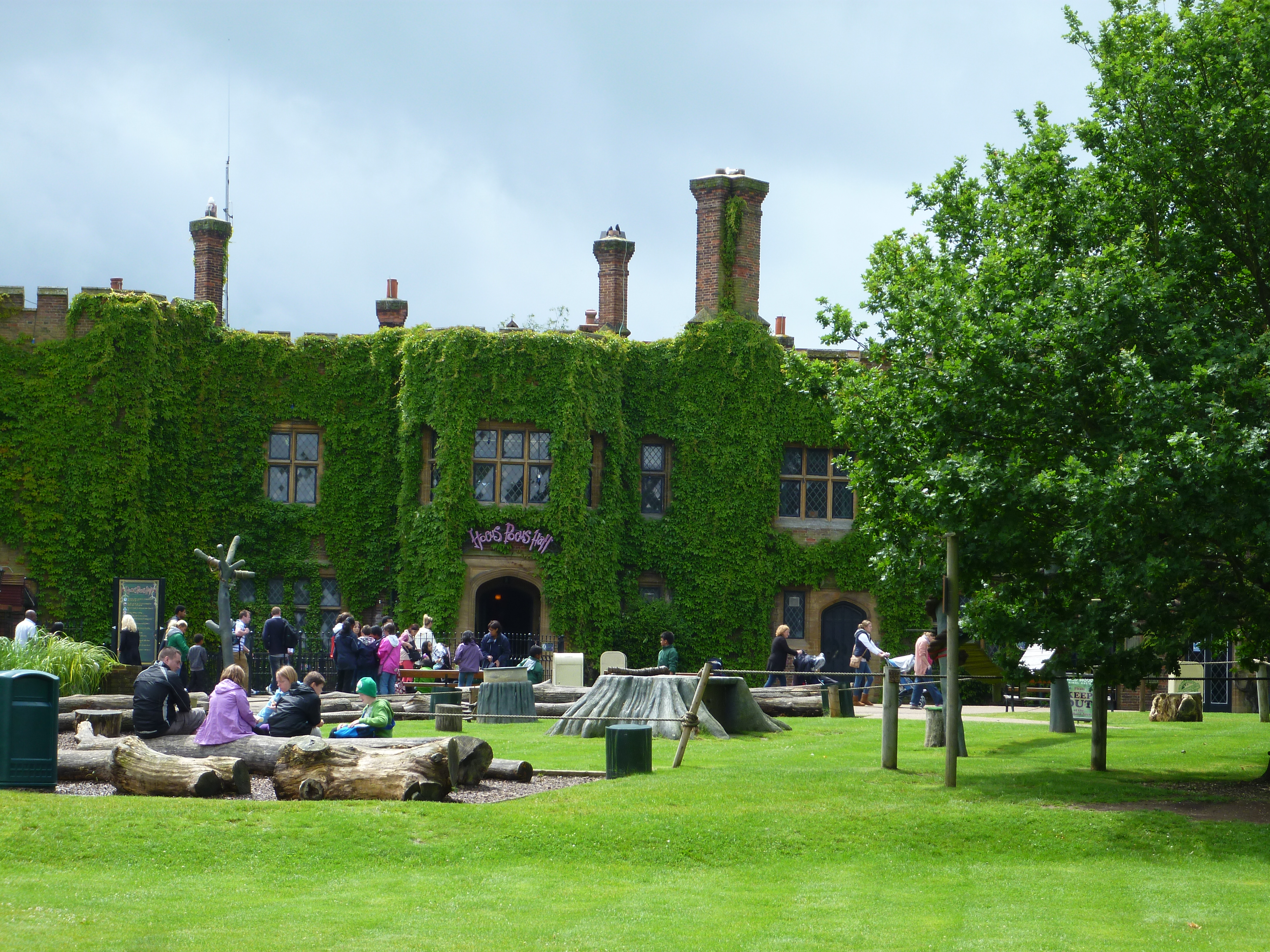
The Burnt Stub Mansion

Chessington Zoo

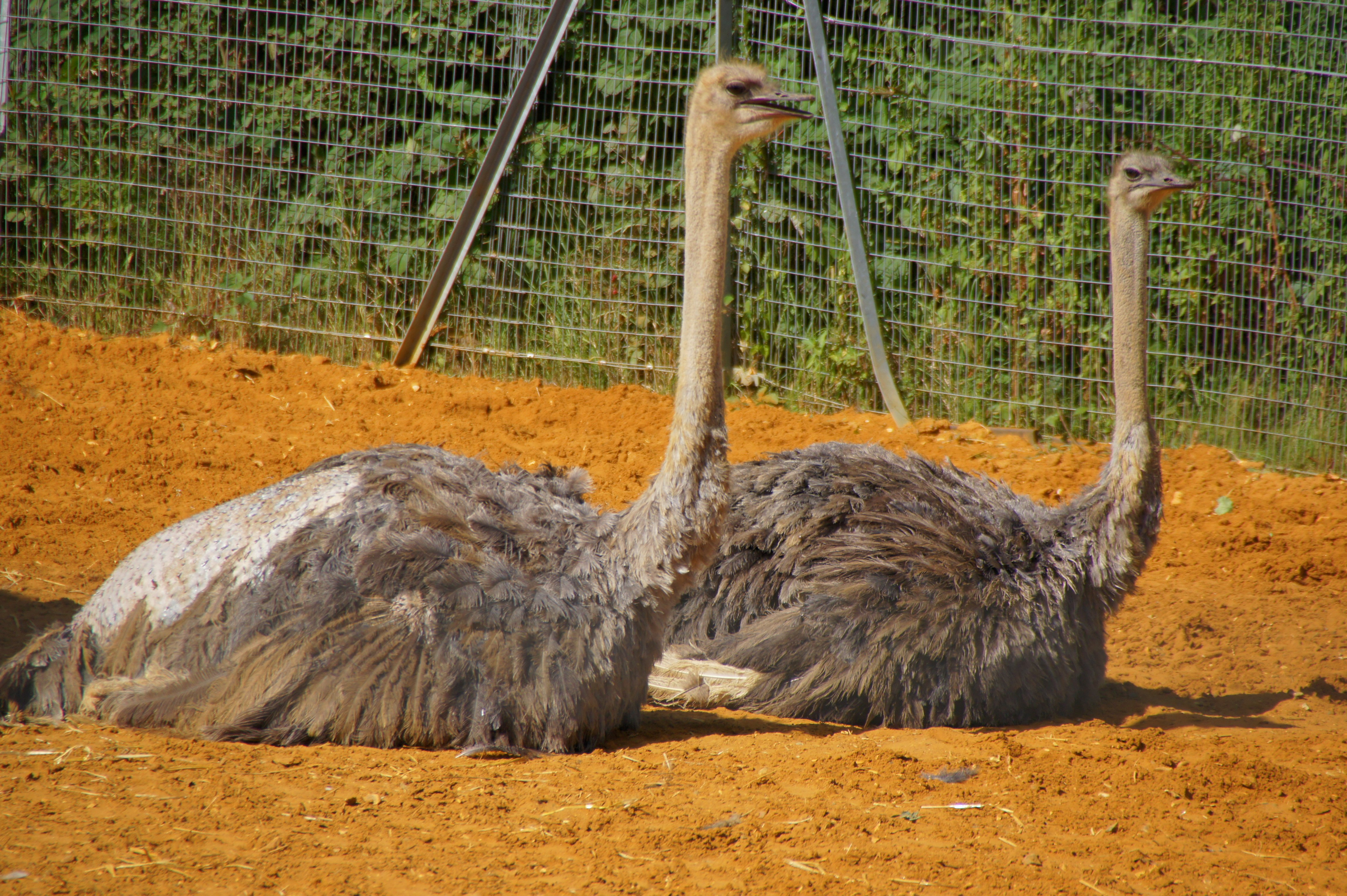
Ostriches in their Wanyama Village enclosure

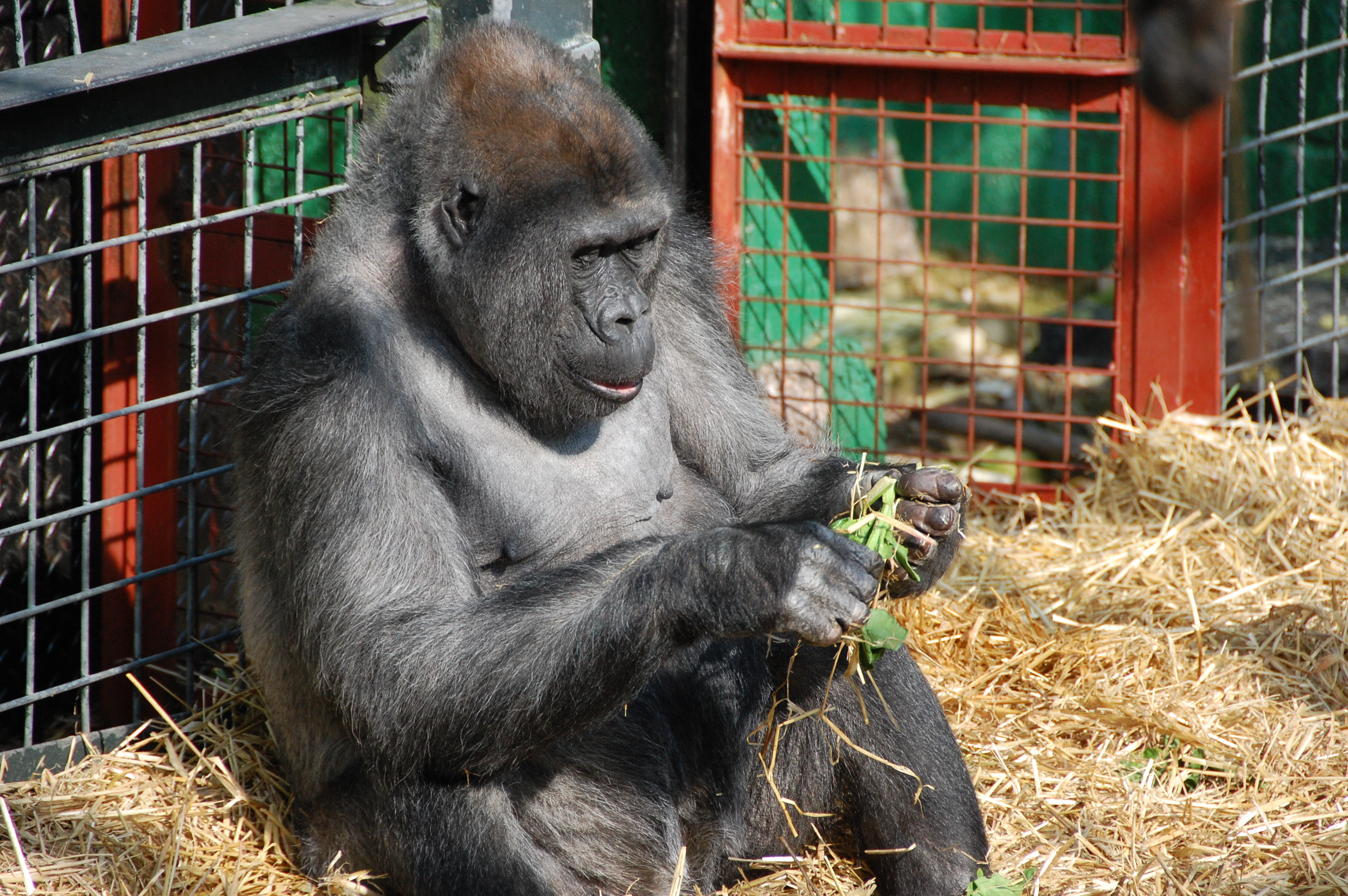
Chessington gorilla eating

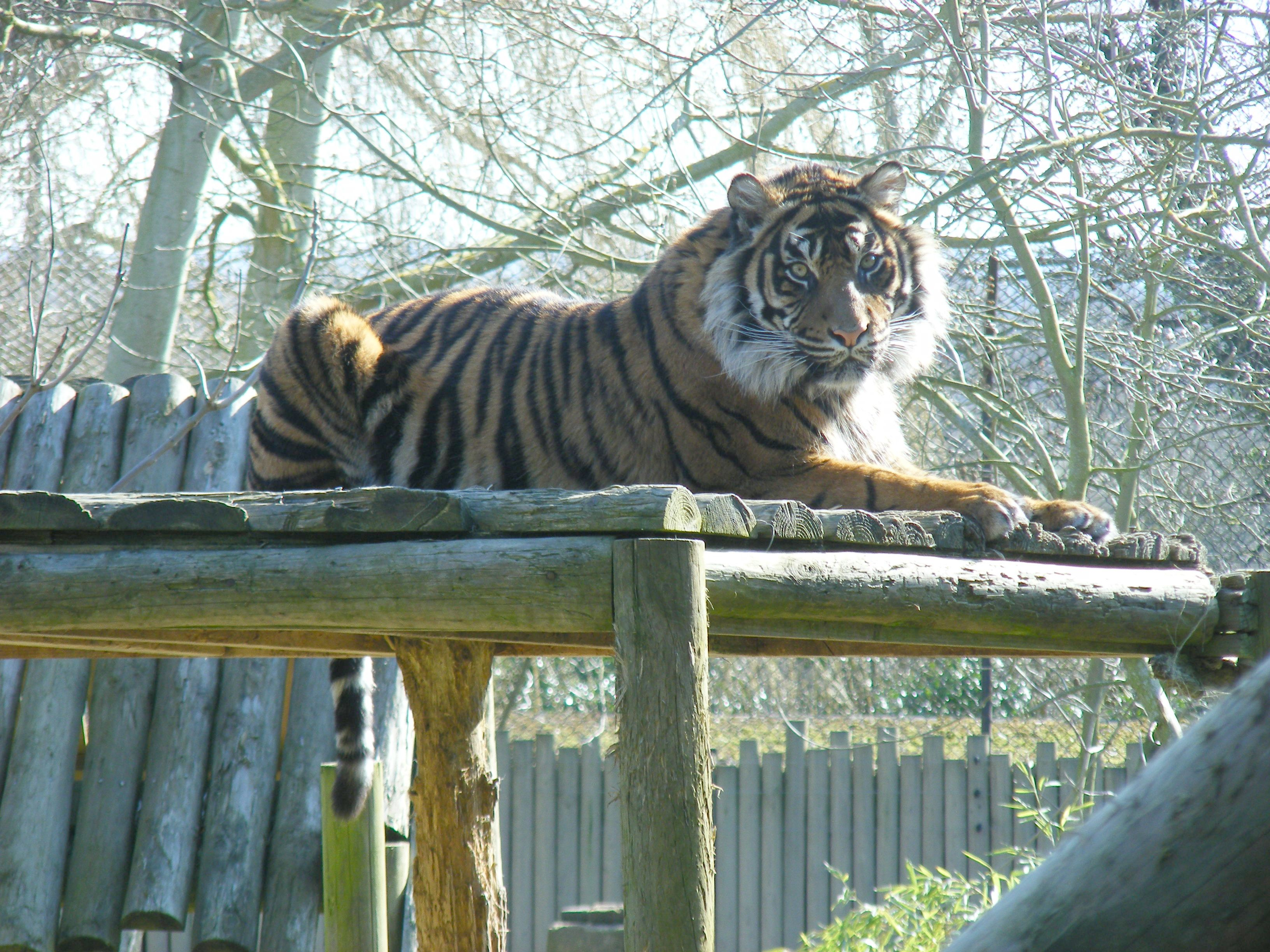
Sumatran tiger 2010

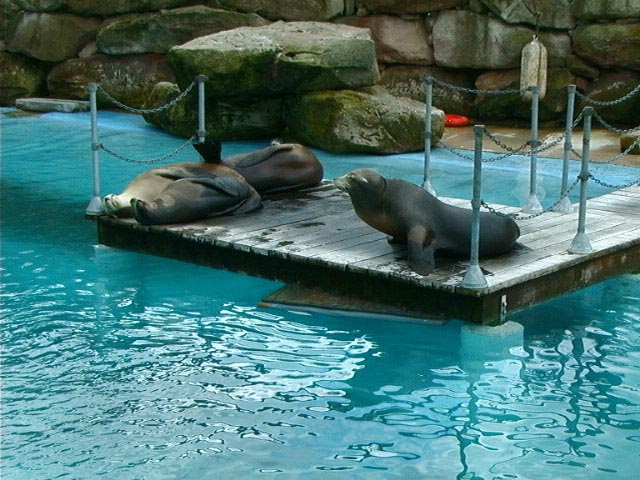
Sea lion enclosure

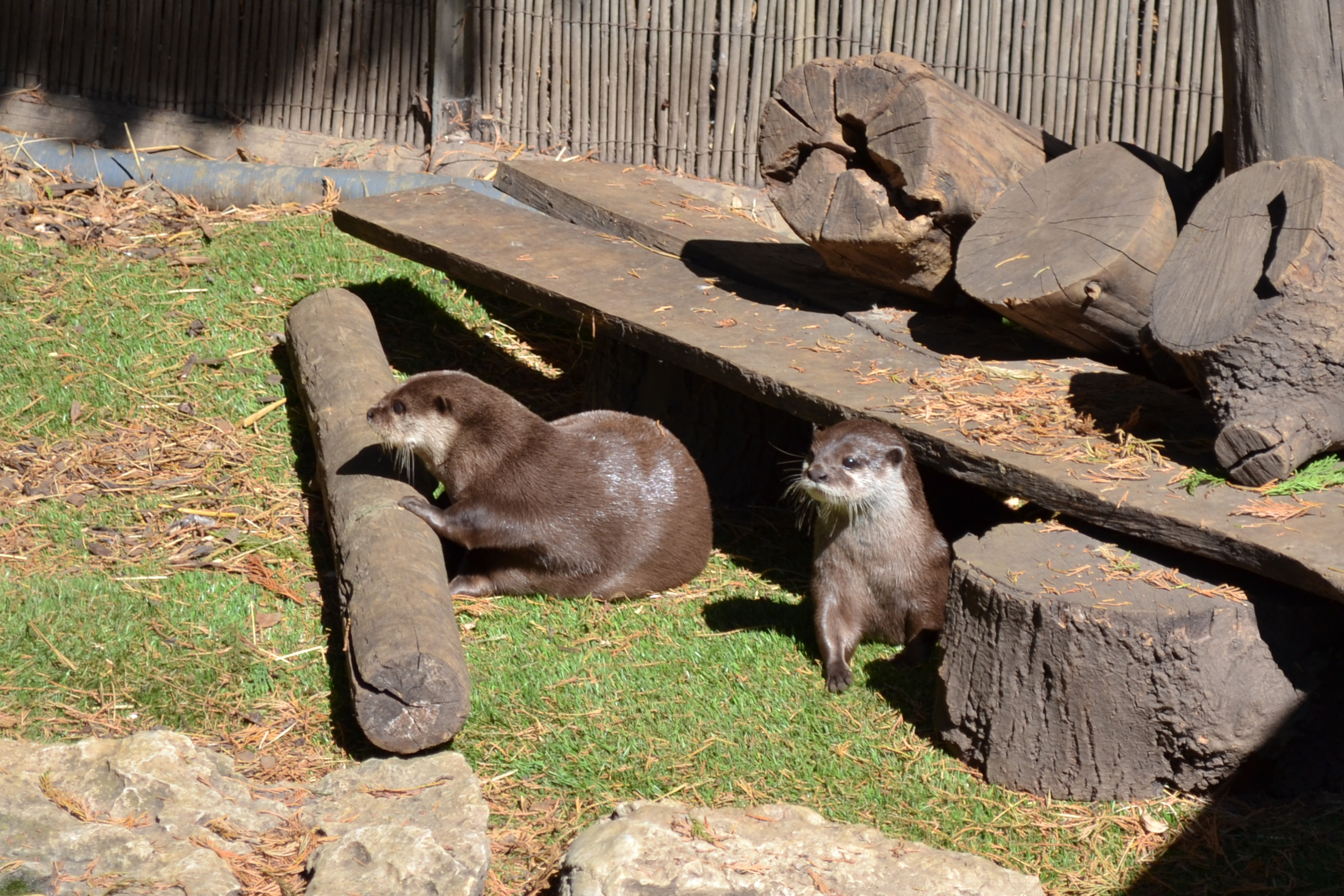
River otter enclosure

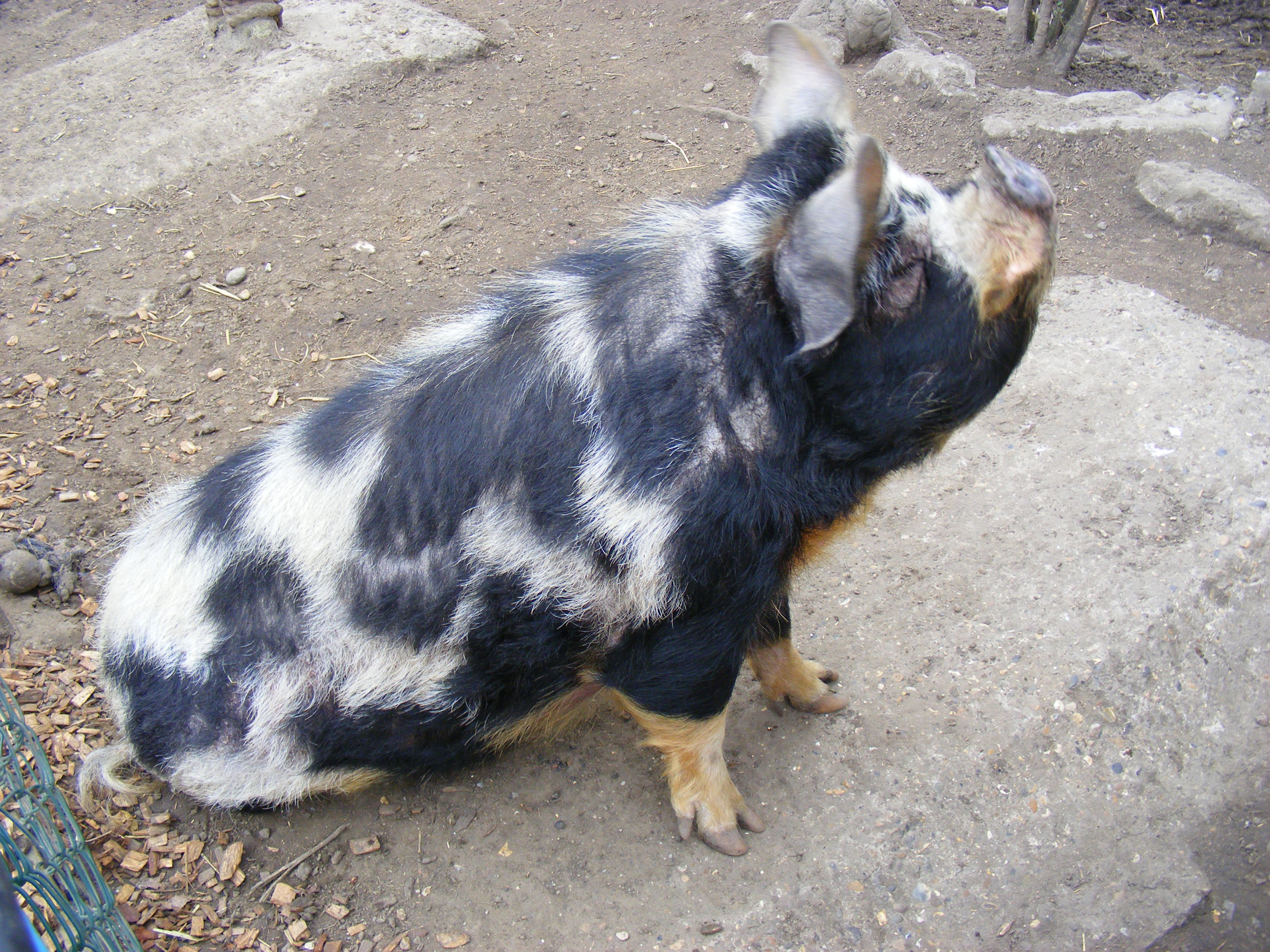
Kunekune at petting zoo

== See also ==
- List of theme parks in the United Kingdom
- List of amusement parks
