= Driving School (disambiguation) =

A driving school is a formal class or program that prepares a new driver to be licensed.

Driving school may also refer to:

- Driving School, a 2001 Indian Malayalam-language film, starring Shakeela
- Driving School, a 1997 British TV series
- Driving School (Alton Towers), a ride at the English theme park
