= Toyland Tours =

Closed dark boat ride

Alton Towers
- Status: Removed
- Opening date: 19 March 1994
- Closing date: 6 June 2005
- Replaced: Around the World in 80 Days
- Replaced by: Charlie and the Chocolate Factory: The Ride

Ride statistics
- Attraction type: Dark boat ride
- Manufacturer: Mack Rides
- Designer: Tussauds Studios
- Capacity: 1,000 riders per hour
- Vehicle type: Boat
- Vehicles: 10 boats
- Riders per vehicle: 9

Toyland Tours was a former attraction in the Land of Make Believe (And later Cred Street) area of Alton Towers theme park, Staffordshire, England. The attraction was opened in 1994 and took riders on an animated boat tour of an eccentric toy factory.

== History ==
The ride system for Toyland Tours first opened in 1981 as Around The World In 80 Days, and the building also contained the haunted walkthrough attraction Doom & Sons and several shops. At the end of the 1991 season, Doom & Sons closed. Around The World In 80 Days was revamped as Toyland Tours in 1994 and the new scenes also expanded into what was once Doom & Sons and its neighbouring outlets.

Early in the 2005 season it was announced that Toyland Tours would be closing, to be replaced by Charlie and the Chocolate Factory: The Ride the following year.

== Ride Experience ==
After leaving the boarding area, the boats passed the Think Tank where teddy bears could be seen fishing for ideas in a water tank, including a 'Big Idea'—a robot inflating a big dinosaur—and a 'Stupid Idea'—a helicopter elephant. After this the boats would enter the Assembly scene, showing lots of large toys being made including the Snailextric, which involves a racetrack where snails are raced, Bouncy castles, which are castles being bounced on trampolines, and a large robot. The boats then entered the Bathtime scene featuring bath toys. The boats then entered a gaming scene featuring Sonic the Hedgehog, seen toe-tapping to the music.

Riders then entered the Wrap & Pack scene, featuring toys wrapping large gifts, a miniature railway and a giraffe named Geronimo, seen helping with the preparations. After this, the boats went under an arch of toy soldiers and into the 'party' finale scene, which consisted of spinning cakes, a wobbling jelly, ballerina hippos and a skiffle band of teddy bears. After the party, the riders travelled through glowing candy canes and encountered a final ballerina hippo before returning to the boarding area.
