= Boneshaker (Alton Towers) =

Removed Supernova flat ride

Alton Towers
- Area: Ug Land
- Status: Removed
- Opening date: 18 March 1995
- Closing date: 9 November 2003
- Replaced: Dino Dancer
- Replaced by: Rita: Queen of Speed

Ride statistics
- Manufacturer: Mondial
- Model: Supernova
- Capacity: 1400 riders per hour
- Height restriction: 120 cm (3 ft 11 in)
- Previous names: Energizer (1995–2001)

Boneshaker was a Mondial Supernova flat-ride located at Alton Towers in Staffordshire, England. It first opened at the park in 1995 as Energizer before being revamped as Boneshaker in 2001.

== History ==
=== Energizer (1995–2000) ===
Energizer first opened on 18 March 1995 in the "Festival Park" area, on the former site of 1001 Nights beside the popular Corkscrew roller coaster.

When X-Sector opened in 1998, Energizer was re-located to the new area and received a new look. It operated here until 2000, when it was moved to make way for Submission, a Chance double inverter.

=== Boneshaker (2001–2003) ===
For 2001, Energizer returned to its original location in the newly redesigned "UG Land" area, now rethemed as Boneshaker. The ride's program was modified to deliver a less intense and slower experience, due to the area now mainly catering to families. In these final years, the ride experienced recurring faults and closed on 9 November 2003, reportedly due to mechanical failure in the ride's gearbox. At the end of 2004, it was removed to make way for Rita: Queen of Speed the following year.
