= John Broome (developer) =

Theme park designer and developer

John Lawson Broome
- Born: John Lawson Broome; 1943
- Died: 2023 (aged 79–80)
- Occupation: Leisure attractions developer
- Known for: Alton Towers

John Lawson Broome was a British developer and operator for theme parks in the United Kingdom. He is known for first developing Alton Towers from a country park into a theme park, opened in 1980.

== Biography ==
John Broome was born in Chester, England, and was the son of a local school headmaster. He boarded at Rossall School in Lancashire. In 1974, Broome married into the Bagshaw family, who owned and operated Alton Towers in Staffordshire. He led its development into a theme park from 1980, beginning a career developing visitor attractions.

During the mid-1980s, Broome led the planned redevelopment of Battersea Power Station in London as an entertainment complex, though the project was later cancelled. Other UK leisure parks and resorts he went on to become either a shareholder or director of during his career included Trentham Gardens, Carden Park, The American Adventure Theme Park and Camel Creek Adventure Park.

=== Alton Towers ===
After marrying into the Bagshaw family, Broome was invited to become a director in the family business, Alton Towers Ltd, and later became its chairman, alongside his brother-in-law Andrew Hollingsworth as managing director. Alton Towers was then a country park with various leisure attractions, which had been gradually developed by the family since 1952.

Broome led the park's development into a new-style theme park from 1980, with permanent rides and areas developed throughout the 1980s. This included a large new entrance, monorail and car park complex, multiple steel roller coasters, a dark ride, a rapids ride, and a log flume. Alton Towers soon became the most visited theme park in the country.

In 1990, due to Alton Towers' significant financial difficulties with the on-going development of Battersea Power Station in London, Broome sold the park to the Tussauds Group and injected the funds into the Battersea project.

=== Battersea Power Station ===
In 1986, John Broome announced ambitious proposals to redevelop Battersea Power Station in London as a major entertainment complex, including numerous themed indoor and outdoor attractions. The historic power station was subsequently bought out by Alton Towers under Broome's direction in 1987. The project received notable support from then Prime Minister Margaret Thatcher.

Preparatory construction work began on the building, including the removal of its central roof, but was later halted and the planned opening year pushed back. Ultimately the project experienced severe financial difficulties which led to its cancellation. Broome ultimately sold the building, after having stabilised the foundations and removed the asbestos.
