= Alton Towers =

Theme park in Staffordshire, England

Alton Towers Resort
- Interactive map of Alton Towers Resort
- Location: Alton, Staffordshire, England
- Coordinates: 52°59′13″N 1°53′06″W
- Opened: 4 April 1980 (Theme park); 3 May 1924 (House & Gardens)
- Owner: City Place Nominees, as nominees for the TP2 Unit Trust (freehold); LondonMetric Property (999-year leasehold)
- Operated by: Merlin Entertainments
- General manager: Howard Ebison
- Slogan: There's no feeling like it
- Operating season: Theme Park; February – January (Full park offering between March – November); Alton Towers Gardens; March – November; Alton Towers Hotel; Year-round; Splash Landings Hotel; Year-round; Enchanted Village Lodges; February - December; Alton Towers Treehouses; Year-round; CBeebies Land Hotel; Year-round; Stargazing Pods; April – November; Alton Towers Waterpark; Year-round; Conference Centre; Year-round; Extraordinary Golf; Year-round
- Attendance: 2025: 2,875,000 (▲13%)
- Area: 910 acres (370 ha; 3.7 km^{2}) (total combined resort area)

Attractions
- Total: 43
- Roller coasters: 11
- Water rides: 3
- Website: altontowers.com

Alton Towers (UK: /ˈɒltən/ OL-tən) (also known as Alton Towers Resort) is a historic estate, theme park and resort complex in Staffordshire, England, near the village of Alton. The park is operated by Merlin Entertainments Group and incorporates a theme park, water park, mini golf and hotel complex.

Originally a stately home of the Earls of Shrewsbury, the Alton Towers grounds were first opened to the public in the late 19th Century. In the 1950s-70s, several new attractions were added, such as a scenic railway and cable car. It started to be developed as a theme park from 1980 with the installation of several rides and the adoption of a pay-once ticket structure. In 1990, the park was purchased by The Tussauds Group, which was merged into Merlin Entertainments in 2007. The park now has many attractions such as Congo River Rapids, Nemesis Reborn, The Smiler and Wicker Man.

It offers a range of accommodation and lodging options alongside the theme park. Facilities include Alton Towers Waterpark, Alton Towers Conference Centre and Extraordinary Golf. The theme park is open seasonally from mid-March to early November, whilst many of its hotels and amenities are open year-round. Special events are hosted throughout the year, including Scarefest, Fireworks and Christmas.

== History ==
=== Early 20th-century public opening ===
Alton Towers first opened to the public on a regular basis following the opening of Alton Towers railway station. Money raised from railway excursions was paid to the Earl to help maintain the grounds.

In 1924, a group of local estate agents formed Alton Towers Ltd to take ownership of the estate and kept the gardens open as a visitor attraction. The estate was later closed to the public upon its requisition by the military during the Second World War.

In the early 1950s, ownership returned to Alton Towers Ltd, now solely controlled by the Bagshaw family, and the grounds were reopened to the public. From this time, Alton Towers grew as a visitor attraction, with additions including a railway, fairground and, by the 1960s, a boating lake and chairlift. After marrying into the Bagshaw family, property developer John Broome became a director of the family business and began leading its development into a theme park.

=== Early theme park developments (1980-1990) ===
Under John Broome's leadership, Alton Towers was opened as a theme park in 1980 with the introduction of a pay-one-price ticket structure and new attractions, including the Corkscrew. The following years saw permanent rides and areas added, including the Log Flume, Talbot Street featuring Around The World in 80 Days, and the Black Hole indoor coaster.

Between 1985–88, further major development saw the opening of a new entrance complex that included the admissions area, themed street with numerous retail and food outlets, a monorail and car parks, as well as the Grand Canyon Rapids and Skyride transport system. Numerous steel roller coasters were also introduced.

=== Tussauds Group developments (1990–2007) ===
In 1990, Broome sold Alton Towers to The Tussauds Group, then a division of Pearson plc, after the park's development of the former Battersea Power Station encountered financial difficulties. The change of park ownership brought another era of major development, involving the opening of many new themed areas and attractions between 1992–97, such as Runaway Mine Train, The Haunted House, Toyland Tours, and Nemesis. The first on-site accommodation, the Alton Towers Hotel, opened in 1996. Tussauds' park development team from 1990 to 2002 included attraction producer John Wardley among others.

The Tussauds Group was sold to venture capital firm Charterhouse in 1998. Oblivion opened that same year. Air (now Galactica) opened in 2002, followed by Spinball Whizzer in 2004. A second hotel and water park, Splash Landing Hotel and Cariba Creek, were opened in 2003.

In 2005, Dubai International Capital (DIC) acquired Tussauds for £800 million. That same year, Rita–Queen of Speed was built in the Ug Land area of the park. Charlie and the Chocolate Factory: The Ride opened in 2006, based on the Roald Dahl book.

=== Merlin Entertainments developments (2007–present) ===
In May 2007, The Blackstone Group purchased The Tussauds Group for US$1.9 billion and merged it with its then-subsidiary Merlin Entertainments. Dubai International Capital also gained 20% of Merlin Entertainment.

On 16 July 2007, Blackstone and Prestbury announced a sale and leaseback of certain Merlin property assets, including Alton Towers, for a total of £622 million, with the properties leased back to Merlin on 35 year renewable leases.

In December 2021 the leases over Alton Towers and three other Merlin sites were extended by a further 35 years in return for a capital contribution of £33.45 million, and the UK rent reviews changed from uncapped RPI increases to CPI plus 0.5 per cent, subject to a floor of 1 per cent and a cap of 4 per cent.

Prestbury's interest subsequently passed to Secure Income REIT, which merged with LXi REIT in July 2022; LXi was in turn acquired by LondonMetric Property in March 2024. In October 2022 the freeholds of Alton Towers and Thorpe Park were sold for £257 million as a 65-year income strip, with 999-year leases granted back to the seller and the right to repurchase the freeholds for £1 after 65 years.

The freehold of the Alton Towers site is registered to City Place Nominees 1 Limited and City Place Nominees 2 Limited, companies incorporated in Guernsey, as nominees for Northern Trust (Guernsey) Limited as trustee of the TP2 Unit Trust; the price recorded on 19 October 2022 was £122,789,028.

As of early 2008, the resort changed its name to Alton Towers Resort to better reflect its status as a multi-day destination. At the end of the 2008 season, the Corkscrew closed and its corkscrew track element was placed in the park admissions plaza as a feature in early 2010. TH13TEEN, the first roller coaster to feature a freefall drop track, opened in March 2010 on the former site of the Corkscrew.

In 2020, Alton Towers operated on a shortened season due to the COVID-19 pandemic, operating on a limited capacity from 4 July to 5 November. The resort resumed normal operations on 12 April 2021.

In 2024, Nemesis was revamped as Nemesis Reborn after a year-long refurbishment, along with a revamp of the surrounding Forbidden Valley area. The following year saw the opening of Toxicator in the area, a HUSS suspended topspin, on the former site of Ripsaw. 2025 also saw a cut to entertainment offerings, with the stage on the lawn being removed and a decrease in live actors.

In 2025, Alton Towers announced a new junior roller coaster based on the Bluey TV series was being developed for CBeebies Land, which opened in March 2026, replacing the Postman Pat Parcel Post ride.

In November 2026, Alton Towers announced that the World of David Walliams had permanently closed several days before the end of season, a week before investigations into Walliams' alleged sexual misconduct was published.

== Theme Park ==
The Alton Towers Theme Park is divided into 10 areas: Towers Street, Mutiny Bay, Katanga Canyon, Gloomy Wood, Forbidden Valley, Dark Forest, The Towers & Gardens, X-Sector, Adventure Land and CBeebies Land. The SkyRide cable car system travels between Towers Street, Forbidden Valley, and the Towers and takes in views of the gardens.

The park's maximum capacity at any one time is set at 28,000 guests. According to the TEA attendance report, the park was estimated to have attracted 2,130,000 people in 2019, a 1.4% increase on 2018's figure of 2,100,000. This made Alton Towers Britain's 2nd most visited theme park, after Legoland Windsor, and the 13th most visited theme park in Europe. Annual admissions surpassed 3 million in both 1994 and 2010, when the Nemesis and Thirteen rollercoasters were opened respectively.

=== Rides and attractions ===
==== Roller coasters ====
Name	Picture	Opened	Type	Manufacturer	Height Min.	Park section	Notes	Previous Attraction
Runaway Mine Train		1992	Steel/Mine Train	Mack Rides	1.1 m	Katanga Canyon	A powered family roller coaster.	—N/a
Nemesis Reborn		1994 (2024)	Steel/Inverted	Bolliger & Mabillard	1.4 m	Forbidden Valley	Europe's first inverted roller coaster. Revamped in 2024 after being retracked.	Nemesis
Oblivion		1998	Steel/Dive coaster	Bolliger & Mabillard	1.4 m	X-Sector	The world's first dive coaster.	—N/a
Galactica		2002	Steel/Flying	Bolliger & Mabillard	1.4 m	Forbidden Valley	The world's first Bolliger & Mabillard flying roller coaster, formerly known as Air (2002–2015). From 2016 to 2018 it featured virtual reality.	The Beast
Spinball Whizzer		2004	Steel/Spinning	Maurer AG	1.2 m	The Towers	A spinning coaster themed to a game of pinball. Between 2010 and 2015 it utilised the Sonic the Hedgehog IP and was named Sonic Spinball.	—N/a
Rita		2005	Steel/Accelerator	Intamin	1.4 m	Dark Forest	A hydraulic launched coaster.	—N/a
TH13TEEN		2010	Multi Dimension Coaster	Intamin	1.2 m	Dark Forest	A family coaster featuring the world's first "vertical free-fall drop" element on a roller coaster.	Corkscrew
The Smiler		2013	Steel/Infinity	Gerstlauer	1.4 m	X-Sector	Holds the world record for most inversions on a roller coaster at 14.	Black Hole
Octonauts Rollercoaster Adventure		2015	Steel	Zamperla	0.9 m	CBeebies Land	A children's coaster themed to the TV show of the same name.	Beastie
Wicker Man		2018	Wooden	Great Coasters International	1.2 m	Mutiny Bay	A wooden coaster featuring live fire effects.	The Flume
Bluey The Ride: Here Come The Grannies		2026	Steel	Zierer	0.9 m	CBeebies Land	A children's coaster themed to the TV show of the same name.	Postman Pat Parcel Post

==== Flat rides ====
Name	Picture	Type	Opened	Area	Manufacturer	Notes	Replaced
Toxicator		Suspended Top Spin	2025	Forbidden Valley	Huss Rides	Top spin ride atop a 16 ft-high platform.	Ripsaw
Marauder's; Mayhem		Teacups Ride	1987	Mutiny Bay	Mack Rides	A teacups ride themed as barrels of gunpowder.	Tea Cup Ride

==== Water/Dark rides ====
Name	Picture	Type	Opened	Area	Manufacturer	Notes	Replaced
Battle Galleons		Splash Battle	2008	Mutiny Bay	Mack Rides	A pirate-themed Splash Battle ride.	Splash Kart Challenge
Congo River Rapids		Rapids ride	1986	Katanga Canyon	Intamin	A water rapids ride.	—N/a
The Curse at Alton Manor		Dark ride	2023	Gloomy Wood	Mack Rides	A haunted themed dark ride.	Duel
Hex – The Legend of the Towers		Walk-through/ Madhouse	2000	The Towers	Vekoma	A themed attraction based on the legend of the chained oak, concluding with a Madhouse ride.	—N/a
Nemesis Sub Terra		Drop tower / walkthrough	2012	Forbidden Valley	ABC Rides	An attraction themed to the Nemesis story, including a small indoor drop tower.	Lava Lump

==== Children's rides and attractions ====
Name	Picture	Type	Opened	Area	Manufacturer	Notes|	Replaced
Cuckoo Cars Driving School		Driving Attraction	2006	The Towers	SB International AB	A children's car driving attraction.	Vintage Cars
Heave Ho		Rockin' Tug	2008	Mutiny Bay	Zamperla	A rocking and swinging boat ride.	—N/a
Sharkbait Reef	Sharkbait Reef at Alton Towers -geograph.org.uk- 1837742	Sea Life Centre	2009	Mutiny Bay	Merlin Magic Making	A Sea Life aquarium themed as a shipwreck.	3D Cinema
In the Night Garden; Magical Boat Ride		Boat ride	2014	CBeebies Land	Mack Rides	An In the Night Garden themed boat ride.	Riverbank Eye Spy
Get Set Go; TreeTop Adventure		Powered monocab ride	1996	CBeebies Land	Premier Rides	Riders travel through the tree tops in their own vehicle above CBeebies Land. Formerly Squirrel Nutty Ride.	—N/a
Bugbie Go Round		Carousel-style attraction	1995	CBeebies Land		A carousel-style attraction featuring Bugbies. Formerly Numtums Number Go Round and originally opening as Doodle Doo Derby.	—N/a
JoJo & Gran Gran at Home		Walk Through	2022	CBeebies Land	Merlin Magic Making	An indoor interactive attraction based on the CBeebies programme JoJo & Gran Gran.	Charlie & Lola's Moonsquirters & Greendrops
Justin's House: Pie-O-Matic Factory		Playhouse	2003	CBeebies Land	Merlin Magic Making	An interactive indoor play area based on the CBeebies programme Justin's House. Formerly Berry Bish Bash.	—N/a
Andy's Adventures Dinosaur Dig		Show	2022	CBeebies Land	Merlin Magic Making	An interactive show and attraction based on the TV show Andy's Dinosaur Adventures.	Mr Bloom's Allotment
Something Special Sensory Garden		Sensory Trail	2014	CBeebies Land	Merlin Magic Making	An outdoor sensory garden based on the CBeebies programme Something Special.	—N/a
Hey Duggee's Big Adventure Badge		Play Area	2022	CBeebies Land	Merlin Magic Making	A play adventure land based on the CBeebies programme Hey Duggee.	Tree Fu Tom Training Camp
Go Jetters Vroomster Zoom Ride		Aerial Roundabout	2017	CBeebies Land	Garmendale Engineering	An aerial roundabout ride themed to CBeebies programme Go Jetters. One of two additions to CBeebies Land for 2017.	—N/a
The Furchester Hotel Live		Show	2017	CBeebies Land	Merlin Magic Making	A live show based on the CBeebies programme The Furchester Hotel. One of two additions to CBeebies Land for 2017.	—N/a
Peter Rabbit Hippity Hop		Two Junior Drop Towers	2019	CBeebies Land	S&S Power	Two mini drop towers based on the CBeebies programme Peter Rabbit. Opened 23 March 2019.	—N/a

==== Theme park transport and grounds ====
Name	Picture	Type	Opened	Area	Manufacturer	Notes
Haunted Hollow		Outdoor trail	2007	Gloomy Wood / Mutiny Bay	Tussauds Studios	Themed path between Gloomy Wood and Mutiny Bay with interactive features. The woodland path was laid in place of the former Park Railway route, which ran 1953–1996.
Monorail		Monorail	1987	Links entrance plaza to car park and hotels	Von Roll Habegger	Monorail system to transport guests from the resort hotels and car parks to the theme park entrance.
Sky Ride		Gondola lift	1987	Stations at Towers Street, Forbidden Valley and Dark Forest	Poma	Cable car to transport guests around the theme park giving views of the gardens, with three stations; Towers Street, Forbidden Valley and Dark Forest.
The Gardens		English landscape garden	1860	Gardens	–	Landscaped historic gardens including lakes, water features and architectural landmarks. Features include: Chinese Pagoda Fountain; Choragic Monument- dedicated to the 15th Earl of Shrewsbury; The Conservatories; Gothic Prospect Tower; Swiss Cottage
The Towers ruins		Ruins	1970	The Towers	–	19th Century stately home ruins

==== Past rides and attractions ====
===== Past roller coasters =====
Attraction	Opened	Closed	Manufacturer	Relocation
Corkscrew	1980	2008	Vekoma	Dismantled: the "corkscrew" section of the track is on display at the park entrance
Mini Apple Coaster	1982	1997	Pinfari	Great Yarmouth Pleasure Beach, England, UK since 1998
The Beastie	1983	2010	Pinfari	Closed during 2011 and 2012 then removed. Used as travelling coaster under the Dragon Challenge name and now located at Barry Island Pleasure Park.
Black Hole	1984	2005	Anton Schwarzkopf	Operated in Furuvik Zoo from 2011 to 2021, until the ride was removed and put up for sale.
4 Man Bob Coaster	1985	1990	Zierer	Was moved to Family Park in France.
Alton Mouse	1988	1991	Vekoma	Idlewild and Soak Zone, Ligonier, Pennsylvania, United States of America since 1993
The Beast	1988	1997	Anton Schwazkopf	Last operated in Salitre Magico, Colombia, from 2010 to 2017
Thunder Looper	1990	1996	Anton Schwarzkopf	Hopi Hari, Brazil since 1999

===== Main past attractions =====
Attraction	Opened	Closed	Ride Type	Notes
Around The World in 80 Days	1981	1993	Dark ride	Redesigned as Toyland Tours.
Doom & Sons	1981	1992	Walkthrough	Incorporated into the Toyland Tours building.
The Flume	1981	2015	Log Flume	Demolished
Twirling Toadstool formerly Ug Swinger	1984	2016	Wave Swinger	Scrapped
Toyland Tours	1994	2005	Dark Ride	Redesigned as Charlie and the Chocolate Factory: The Ride.
The Haunted House	1992	2002	Dark Ride	Rethemed as Duel — The Haunted House Strikes Back!
Submission	2001	2013	Chance Rides Inverter	Scrapped
Dynamo	1993	2003	Huss Breakdance	Currently a travelling ride in Switzerland.
Boneshaker formerly Energizer	1995	2003	Mondial Supernova	Operating at Terra Mitica under the name of La Cólera de Akiles.
Ripsaw	1997	2015	Huss Topspin	Scrapped
Charlie and the Chocolate Factory: The Ride	2006	2015	Dark ride	Redesigned as the Alton Towers Dungeons.
Ice Age: The 4D Experience	2012	2016	4D Theatre	
Enterprise	1984	2021	HUSS Enterprise	Scrapped
Duel – The Haunted House Strikes Back!	2003	2022	Shooting Dark Ride	Redesigned as The Curse at Alton Manor.
The Blade	1980	2024	HUSS Pirate Ship	A swinging ship, themed to a swinging blade. It was originally situated in Fantasy World between 1980 and 1996, as the Pirate Ship, before moving to Forbidden Valley in 1997. Was the oldest operating ride in the park at its time of closure in 2024.
Flavio's Fabulous Fandango	2021	2024	Sizzler	A sizzler/twister flat ride manufactured by PWS.
The Alton Towers Dungeon	2019	2024	Boat ride and walk-through attraction	An in-park version of Merlin's Dungeon attractions, with five interactive scenes and a boat ride. Replaced by "Amigos in the Afterlife", a family scare attraction.
Postman Pat; Parcel Post	2014	2025	Track ride	An interactive car ride based on the CBeebies programme Postman Pat: Special Delivery Service.
Gangsta Granny: The Ride	2021	2026	Dark ride	A dark ride based on the book of the same name.
Raj's Bouncy Bottom Burp	1999	2026	Junior drop tower	A junior drop tower. Originally opened as Frog Hopper.
Royal Carousel	1991	2026	Carousel	A carousel ride. Originally opened as Gallopers Carousel.

=== Park areas ===
==== Timeline of park areas ====
Years areas opened
1980	1981	1982	1983	1984	1985	1986	1987	1988	1989	1990	1991	1992	1993	1994	1995	1996	1997	1998	1999	2000	2001	2002	2003	2004	2005	2006	2007	2008	2009	2010	2011	2012	2013	2014	2015	2016	2017	2018	2019	2020	2021	2022	2023	2024	2025	2026
Ingestre Centre				Aqualand								Katanga Canyon																																		
Ingestre Centre				Aqualand								Merrie England																Mutiny Bay																		
Springfield Centre				Fantasy World														X-Sector																												
Talbot Centre				Festival Park															UG Land											Dark Forest																
	Talbot Street												Land of Make Believe				Cred Street												Cloud Cuckoo Land											The World of David Walliams						
						Towers Street																																								
The Towers																																					The Towers									
						Kiddies Kingdom										Adventure Land																					The Towers									
						Kiddies Kingdom										Storybook Land																		CBeebies Land												
										Britannia Farm		Safeway Farm			Old MacDonald's Farmyard																			CBeebies Land												
												Thunder Valley		Forbidden Valley																																
												Gloomy Wood																																		

Previous themed area

Current themed area

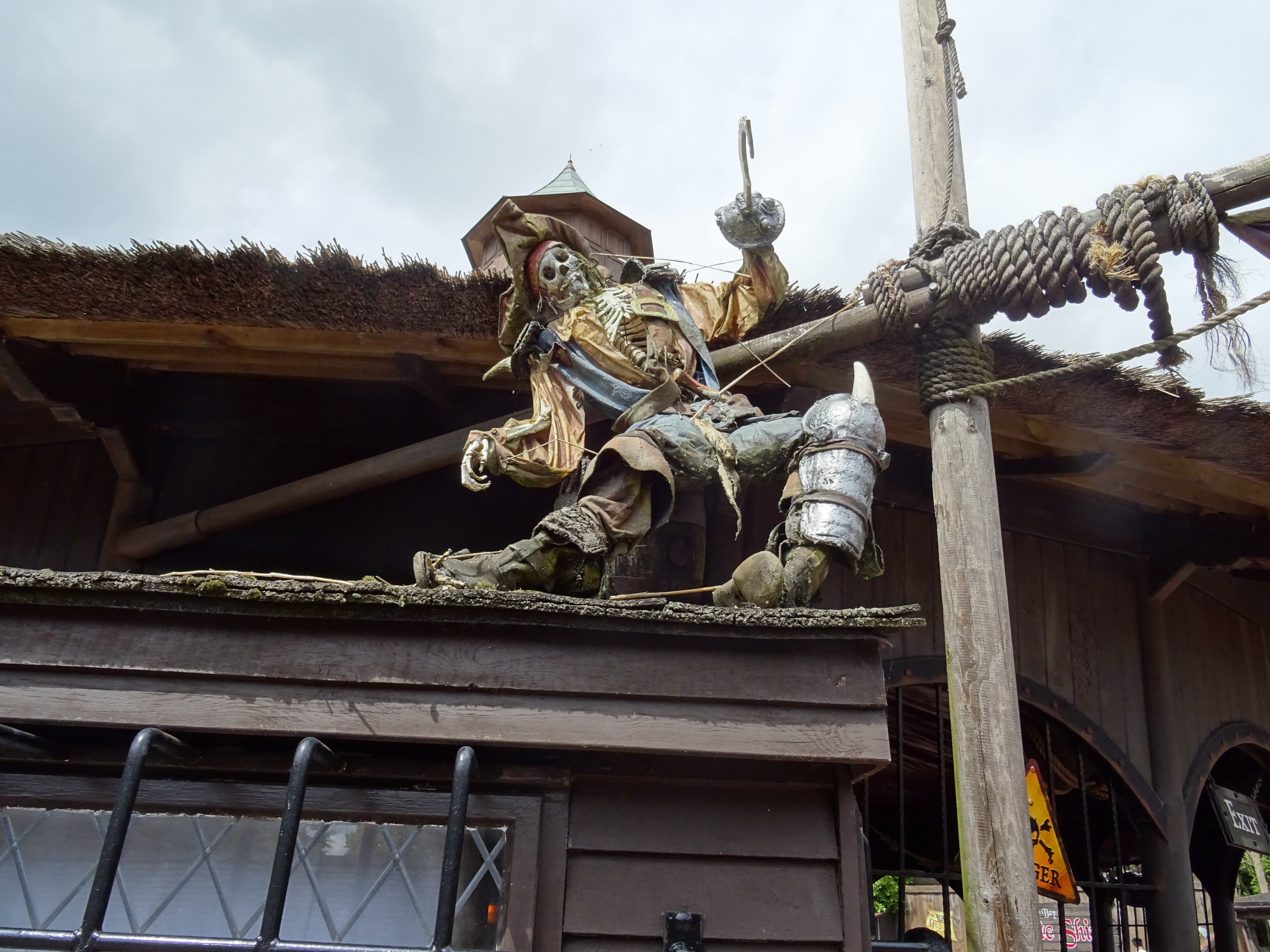
Mutiny Bay

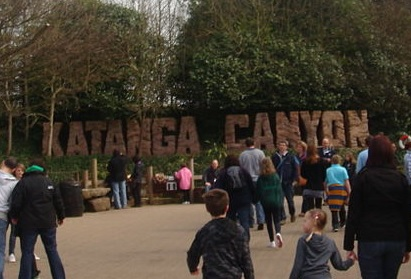
Katanga Canyon

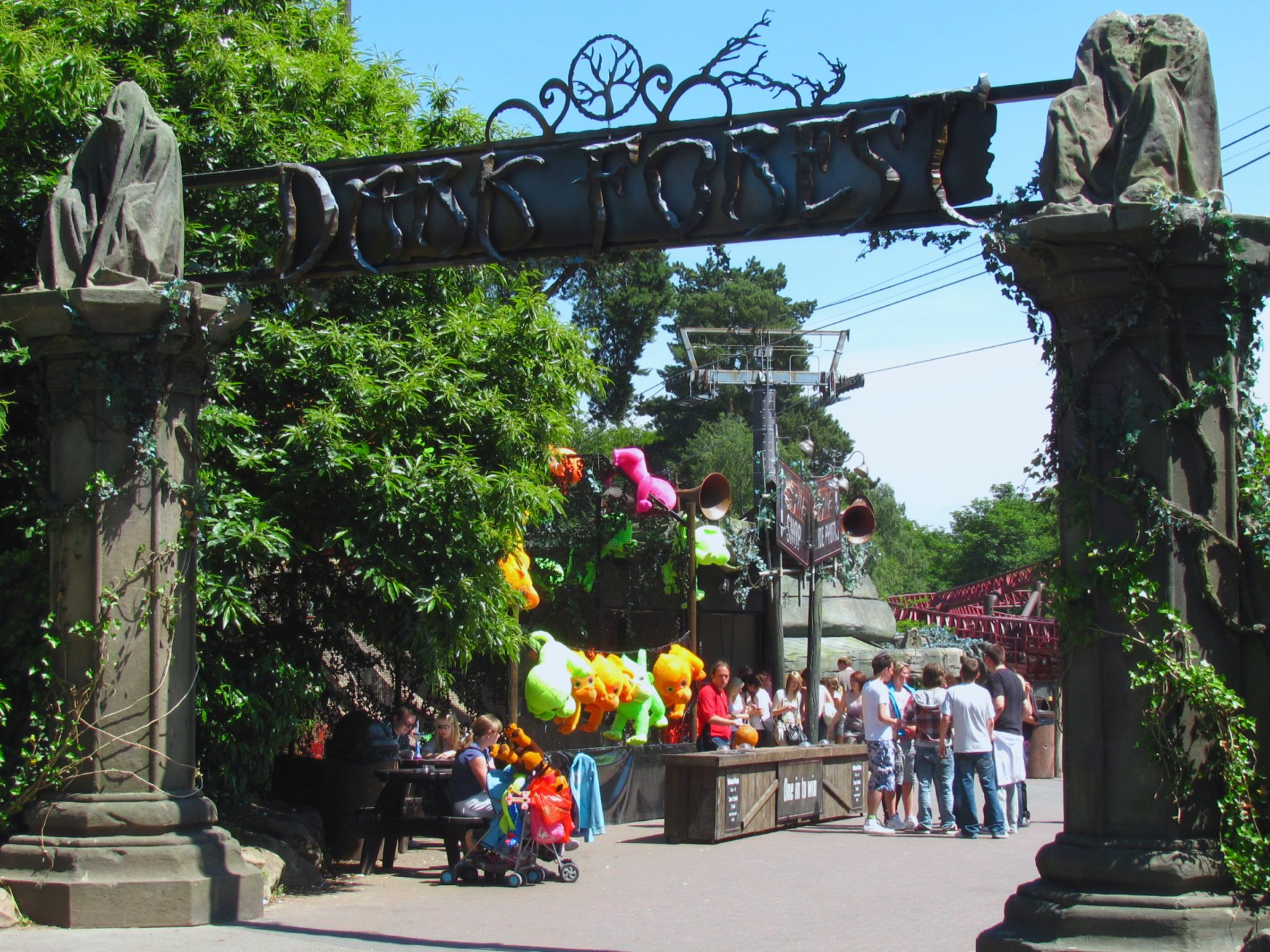
Dark Forest

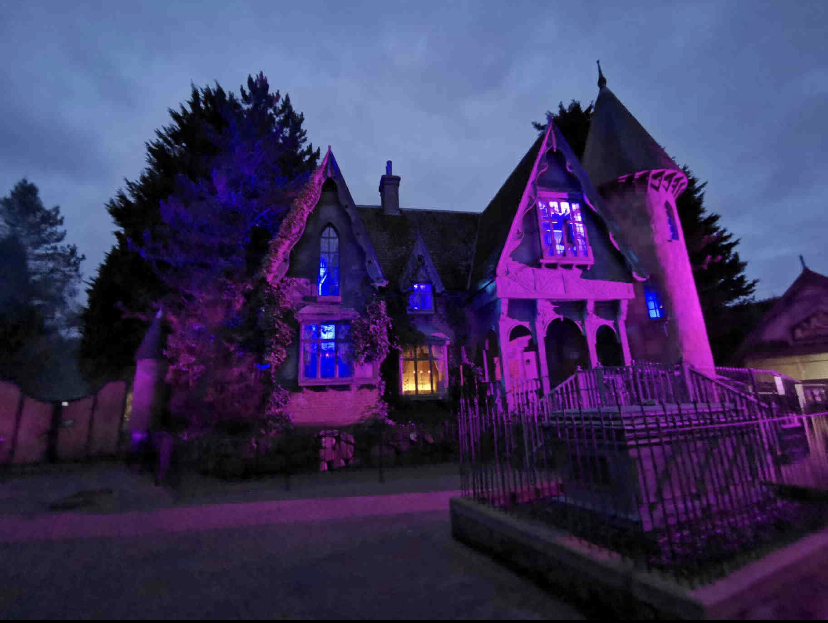
Gloomy Wood

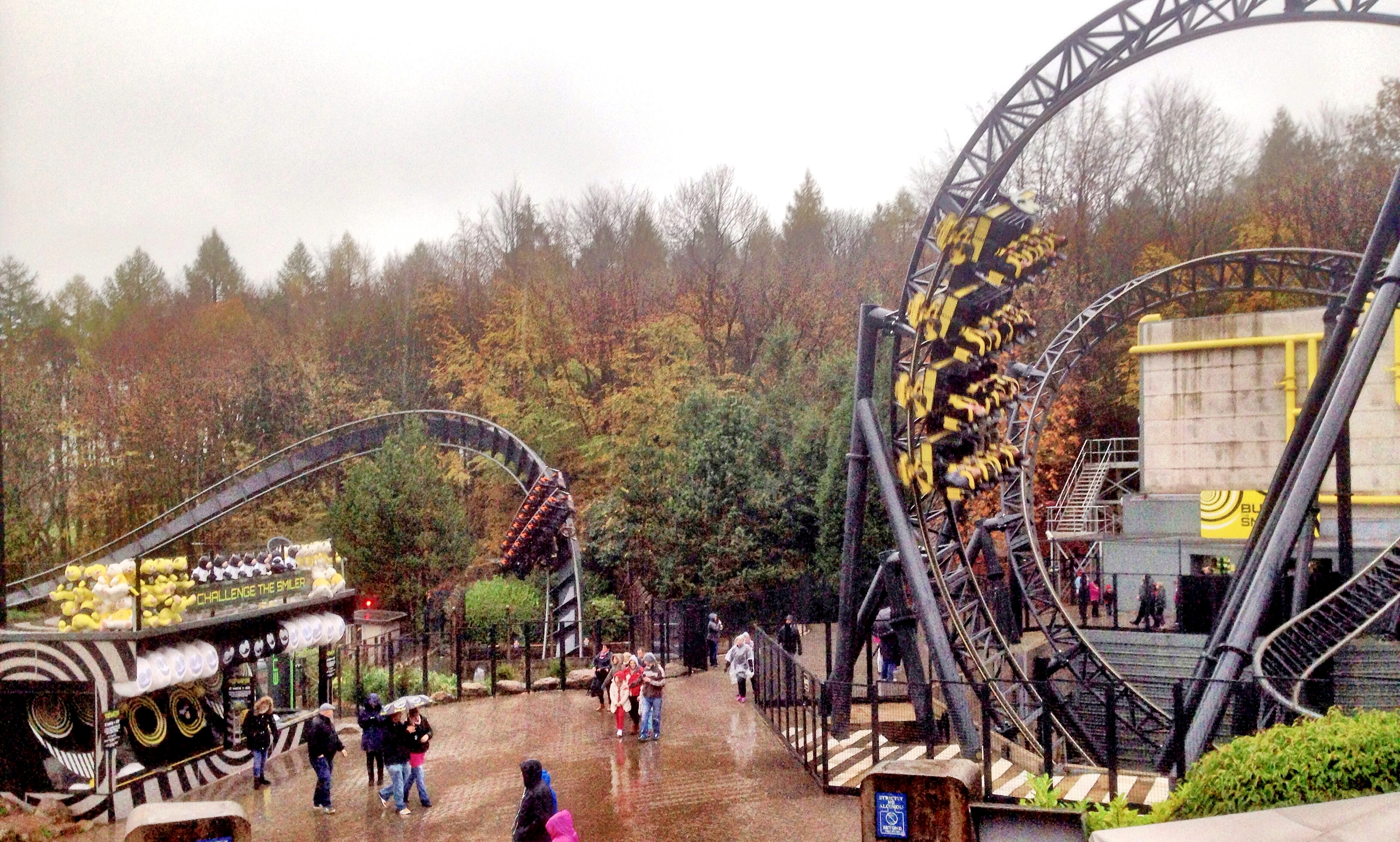
X-Sector

==== Towers Street ====
Opened in 1986, Towers Street is the first area that visitors enter and is loosely themed as a town street, with views of the Towers across the lake at its end. Along the street are the jumping frog fountains and a lawn where seasonal events take place. The first SkyRide station is located nearby, which is a 1,048-metre (3,438 ft) long cable car transport that opened in 1987, and was refurbished 2009. The monorail moves guests between the park, and the accommodation, water park and car parks.

==== Katanga Canyon ====
Katanga Canyon is themed as an African village and opened in 1992. Rides include the roller coaster Runaway Mine Train, a steel powered coaster that reaches a speed of 22 mph (36 km/h) on a 1000 ft long track (305 m) and height of 36 ft (11 m); height limit 90 cm, and the Congo River Rapids water ride.

==== Gloomy Wood ====
Gloomy Wood serves as the area around the dark ride The Curse at Alton Manor.

In 2007, a themed footpath through the woods was added to the area, named Haunted Hollow. The pathway follows the route formerly used by the park's old scenic railway, linking from Mutiny Bay. Haunted Hollow includes tombstones, statues and other features, some of which interact with guests using sound effects.

==== Forbidden Valley ====
Forbidden Valley is themed as a research facility run by the "Phalanx" military organisation. Prior to a revamp in 2024, the area had a 'post-apocalyptic' theme with scrapyard structures populating the area. A Skyride station also serves the area.

The area is the location of Nemesis Reborn, previously Nemesis, which opened in 1994. Nemesis Reborn is a steel inverted coaster that reaches a speed of 50 mph (81 km) with four inversions, set in a rocky quarry over waterfalls. The attraction is themed as an alien creature inhabiting the quarry.

Galactica is a B&M flying coaster, originally opening as Air in 2002. Air was loosely themed as a peaceful landscape, separate to the 'apocalyptic' theme of the rest of Forbidden Valley. Air was redesigned as Galactica in 2016, adopting virtual reality headsets and a space travel theme. The VR headsets have since been removed.

The area also contains two smaller attractions. Nemesis Sub-Terra is an indoor attraction featuring a drop tower ride. The experience is themed in connection to Nemesis, and was the first introduction of the Phalanx. The ride originally operated from 2012 to 2015, however it reopened in 2023. In 2025, the HUSS suspended topspin Toxicator was added on the former site of Ripsaw, sitting over the pathway on a 16 ft elevated concrete platform.

In May 2016, the 'Rollercoaster Restaurant' opened, offering a dining experience where guests have their food delivered by looping rails. The restaurant is open daily from 10am – 9:30pm; available to guests without theme park admission after the park has closed, except during Scarefest and Fireworks events. Since its opening, the Rollercoaster Restaurant has also provided a separate entrance to the park for hotel guests.

==== X-Sector ====
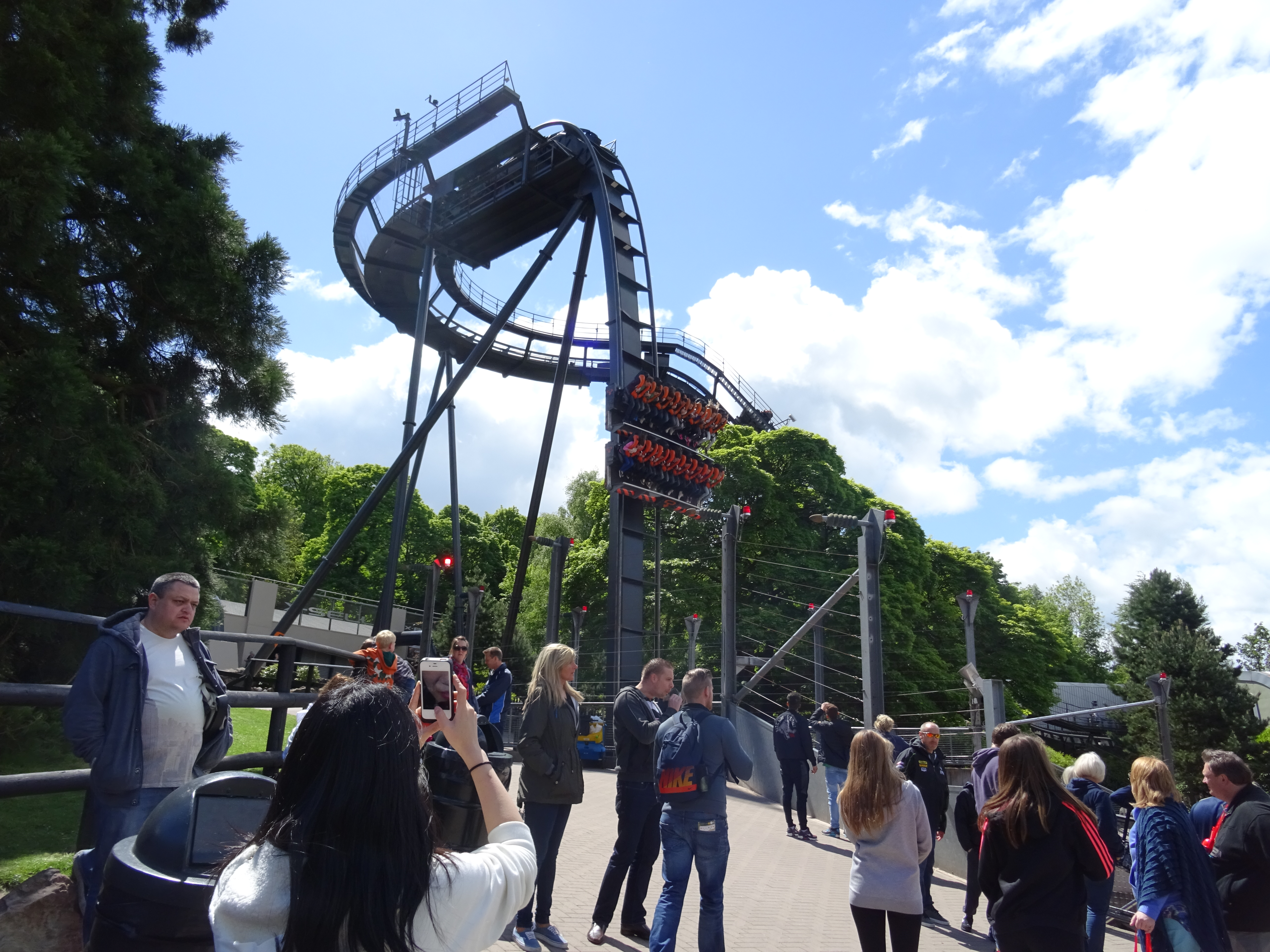
View of Oblivion

X-Sector is themed as a secretive facility, suggested to be subjecting park guests to experimental testing.

The area contains two roller coasters. Oblivion is a steel dive coaster opened in 1998 and manufactured by Bolliger & Mabillard. The cars are held over the edge of the 87.5° drop for between one and three seconds, before diving into a deep tunnel. The Smiler is a Gerstlauer Infinity Coaster opened in 2013, and holds the world record for most inversions on a roller coaster at 14.

Previous rides in X-Sector include The Black Hole, which was a Jet Star 2 coaster enclosed in a tent, where The Smiler is located today. Energizer (later renamed Boneshaker) was a swinging gondola flat ride. It was replaced by Submission in 2001, a "Chance Double Inverter" flat ride, which was itself removed in 2014. Enterprise was a standard HUSS Enterprise model which opened in 1984 and removed in 2023.

==== Mutiny Bay ====
Mutiny Bay is a pirate-themed family area, which opened in 2008.

Attractions in Mutiny Bay include: Battle Galleons, an interactive "Splash Battle" boat ride, where guests sit in tracked boats while soaking other riders with water cannons. The water cannons were removed during maintenance work in 2026 and replaced with smoke effects for the ride's seasonal opening on 23rd May. Also in the area is the rocking boat ride, Heave Ho. The park's original teacups ride was re-themed to become Marauders Mayhem, with the tea cup cars being redesigned as gunpowder barrels.

The Wicker Man wooden roller coaster opened adjacent to the area in 2018 and is listed under the area's name. The "Welcome Inn" bar within the Mutiny Bay courtyard also shares the coaster's theme.

In 2009, a Sea Life Centre named Sharkbait Reef opened in the location previously home to the 3D Cinema. This includes "touch pools" for interacting with underwater species and a 10-metre (33 ft) underwater tunnel.

==== Dark Forest ====
The Dark Forest is themed as a supernatural woodland area; to coincide with the opening of TH13TEEN, a steel family coaster themed as a haunted crypt, that opened on 20 March 2010. Th13teen, features the "world's first freefall drop on a roller coaster" – an indoor, vertically dropping track element. The ride replaced the Corkscrew; the park's first roller coaster, which opened in 1980. Rita is a hydraulically launched steel sit-down coaster that reaches a top speed of 61 mph (100 km) and is themed as an abandoned drag racer.

==== CBeebies Land ====
CBeebies Land is based on the BBC children's TV channel: CBeebies and opened on 24 May 2014. The area includes rides, shows and interactive experiences based on programmes from CBeebies, including In the Night Garden..., Justin's House, Octonauts, Go Jetters, The Furchester Hotel and Bluey (TV series), among others. Attractions in the area are: In the Night Garden Magical Boat Ride, Bluey The Ride: Here Come The Grannies!, Get Set Go Treetop Adventure, Something Special Sensory Garden, Bugbie Go Round, Justin's House: Pie-O-Matic Factory, Hey Duggee Big Adventure Badge, Andy's Adventures Dinosaur Dig, Jojo & Gran Gran at Home, Peter Rabbit Hippity Hop, Octonauts Roller Coaster Adventure, The Furchester Hotel Live and Cbeebies Land Sensory Space. Shows at the Big Fun Show Time stage include: Bluey Live, Teletubbies Big Band Show, Bing Live, and Hey Duggee Live.

In 2015, Octonauts Roller Coaster Adventure opened, it is an underwater themed children's roller coaster; built on the former site of The Beastie rollercoaster. CBeebies Land was further expanded in 2017 with the opening of the Go Jetters Vroomster Zoom Ride and The Furchester Hotel Live, and again in 2019 with the addition of Peter Rabbit Hippity Hop and Teletubbies Big Band Live Show. 2022 saw 3 new attractions arrive, being Hey Duggee Big Adventure Badge, Andy's Adventures Dinosaur Dig, and JoJo and Gran Gran at Home. 2024 saw the redevelopment of former attraction, Ninas Sensory Lab, to become Cbeebies Land Sensory Space. 2025 saw the closure of Postman Pat Parcel Post and the shortening of Get Set Go: Treetop Adventure to make way for a new Bluey themed junior coaster (named Bluey The Ride: Here Come The Grannies), which opened on 28th March 2026.

==== The Towers ====
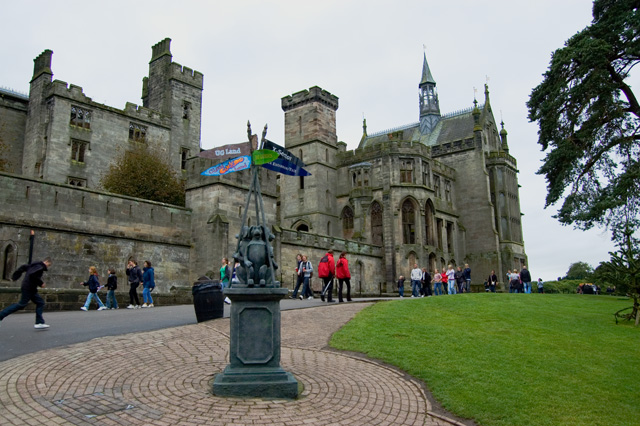
Main historic house

The Towers are the ruins of Alton Towers stately home and are the source of the park's name. The house belonged to the Talbot family as a stately home until 1924 and was remodelled by architect Augustus Pugin, also noted for his work on the Palace of Westminster. The ruins are occasionally open to the public for guided tours. Key areas of The Towers include the banqueting hall, the chapel, conservatories, and Her Ladyship's Gardens.

Hex – The Legend of the Towers, a walk-through dark ride based within the ruins themselves, opened in 2000. The finale to the ride is a Vekoma Madhouse located away from the real Towers but themed as a secret vault. The theme is based on a local legend about the chained oak tree.

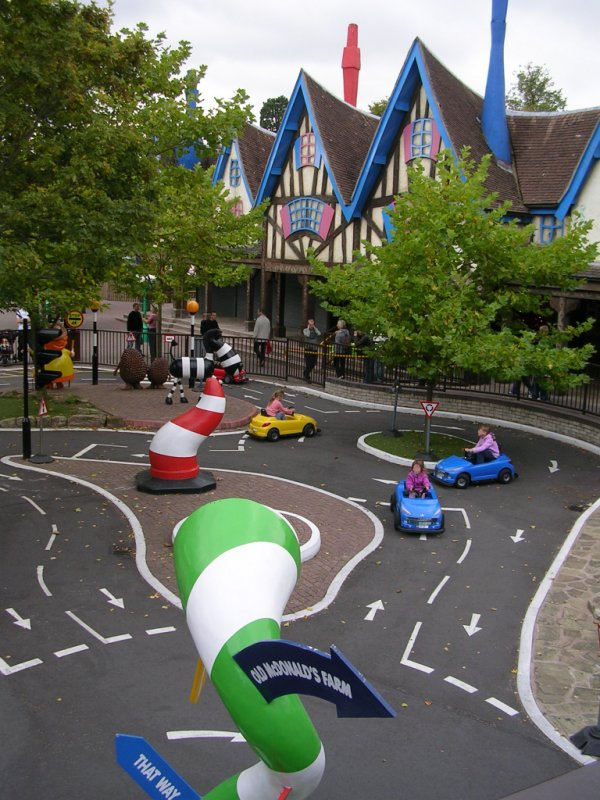
Driving School attraction in The Towers

Cuckoo Cars Driving School allows children to drive miniature electric cars around a themed road layout, featuring visual jokes along the way. A SkyRide station is located nearby Fountain Square, giving access to other areas of the park.

Spinball Whizzer is also listed under the area's name.

==== The Gardens ====
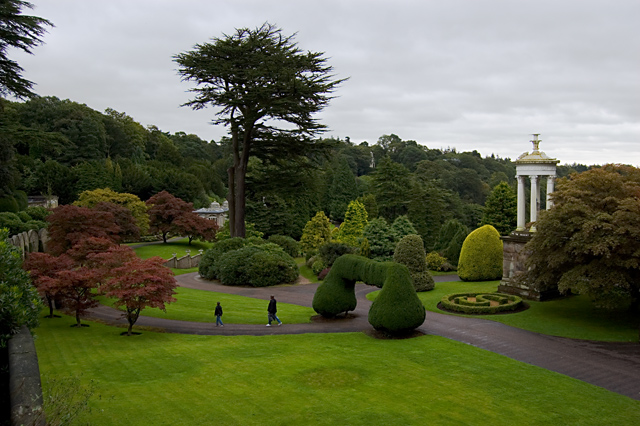
Monument to Charles Talbot, the 15th Earl of Shrewsbury set in gardens he created

Near the garden entrance is a cenotaph to the 15th Earl of Shrewsbury, who built Alton Towers and developed its gardens in the early 19th century. The monument features a marble bust with an inscription reading "He made the desert smile". Other landmarks include a Chinese Pagoda Fountain, The Swiss Cottage, Miniature 'Stonehenge', and orangeries.

==== Past Areas ====
===== The World of David Walliams =====
The World of David Walliams opened in May 2021 and was aimed at younger children aged 7–11. It was based on the children's books by David Walliams. Attractions included Gangsta Granny: The Ride, Raj's Bouncy Bottom Burp (the former Frog Hopper) and Royal Carousel (previously Galloper's Carousel). The area had various names over the years including "Cloud Cuckoo Land", "Cred Street" and "The Land of Make Believe", each had a similar a cartoon-inspired look, mainly featuring Toyland Tours. The area was first built as "Talbot Street" in 1981, becoming the park's first themed area, home to the Around The World in 80 Days and Doom & Sons dark rides. The World of David Walliams also included many of the author's easter eggs such as one of the streets being called "Wallibums Way".

Another attraction, Flavio's Fabulous Fandango, was temporarily added to the land for opening, operated by an external company (Mellors), but was removed in advance of the 2025 Operational Season. The land also featured Raj's Shop and various outdoor entertainment.

The World of David Walliams closed on 3 November 2026, five days before the end of the 2026 season and a week before allegations of Walliams' sexual misconduct were made public.

== Waterpark ==
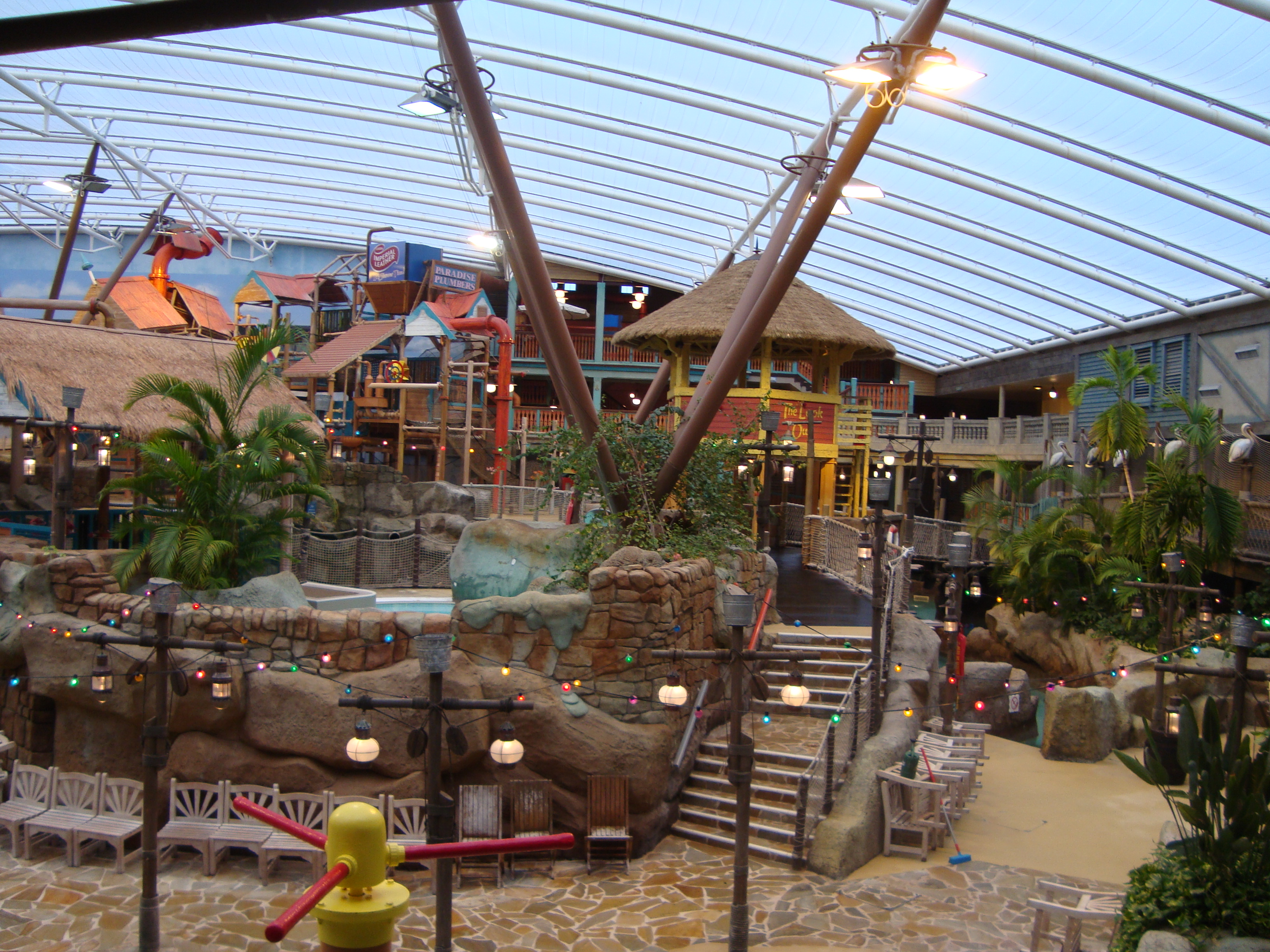
Alton Towers Waterpark

The Alton Towers Waterpark, formerly known as Cariba Creek, opened alongside the Splash Landings Hotel in 2003. It is a large (with 7 pools and 10 water slides), part-indoor and part outdoor waterpark themed as a tropical Caribbean lagoon. The waterpark features several fast slides, a lazy river, a giant tipping bucket and many other water features. Also located there are two food and drink venues: Adventures Cave and Ice Cream Shack. A separate ticket is needed for waterpark access as it is not included with the theme park entrance price.

Attractions include Lagoona Bay, which is the main tropical pool, with water cannons, geysers and waterfalls. The Little Leak is a paddling pool for young children with two small slides and interactive pipes to play with, while Wacky Waterworks Treehouse is a wooden 'treehouse' with water cannons, and other interactive features to squirt passing people with.

The largest ride in the Waterpark is the water coaster The Master Blaster, a high speed water jet flume that contains sharp turns, drops and dark sections.

Other rides include Rush & Rampage, twin racing slides where riders experience wide turns. This attraction requires rubber rings. Lazy River (Calypso Creek) is a slow-moving water circuit, taking riders underneath spraying water jets and tipping buckets of water. Rubber rings are available. The Tipping Bucket is a container filled with 1000 litres of water which regularly tips its contents over people standing below. Flash Floods are tiered outdoor pools with two slides leading to the middle pool and three leading to the bottom. Other swimming pools include Volcanic Springs, and indoor heated hot pool, and Bubbly Wubbly Pool, an outdoor heated pool and whirlpool.

== Resort accommodation ==
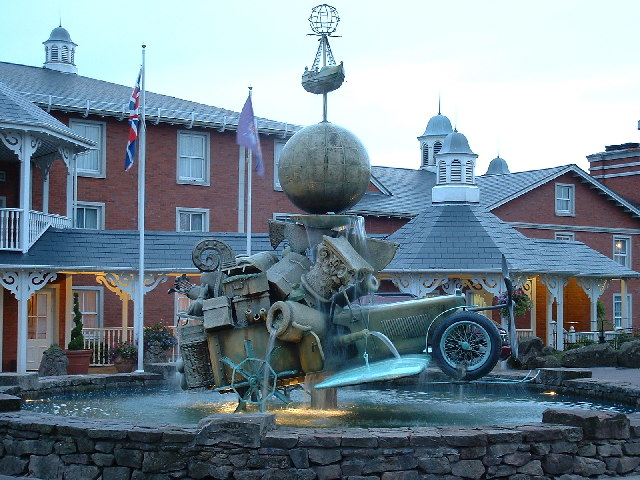
The fountain at the entrance to Alton Towers Hotel

The resort contains 3 hotels, and 2 sets of glamping-style accommodation:

=== Alton Towers Hotel ===
The Alton Towers Hotel is a four star explorer-themed hotel that opened on 10 April 1996 with 180 rooms, the Secret Garden table service restaurant, the Chinese-themed Dragon's Bar, the traveller-themed Captain's Bar, a small arcade and the Emporium gift shop. A conference venue called the Emperor's Suite is also located next the Dragon's Bar on the ground floor. There are thirteen themed room categories. The Explorer rooms are the hotel's standard category, while the Arctic Explorer and Moon Voyage rooms on the second and third floors represent the mid-range offering. The themed rooms on the top two floors of the hotel include Gangsta Granny, Chocolate, Sleepover, Coca-Cola, Splish Splash, Big Pyjama, The Smiler, Arabian Nights, Princess, and Dreamy Den. Until the Rollercoaster Restaurant opened in 2016, the rock gardens behind the hotel were home to a route to Forbidden Valley called the Woodland Walk. The entrance near Galactica has been used since, as the CBeebies Land Hotel is now situated on the edge of the garden.

=== Splash Landings Hotel ===
The Splash Landings Hotel opened in June 2003. The hotel has a relaxed Caribbean theme and is attached to the Alton Towers Waterpark, with its entrance located on the ground floor. It also has a four star rating and houses 216 rooms, along with the Flambo's Jambo buffet restaurant, the Coffee Shack kiosk, Ma Garrita's Bar, the Shack gift shop, and a much larger arcade. There are three room themes: Beachcomber, Ice Cave, and the Mutiny Bay-themed Pirate rooms. The hotel is also connected to the Alton Towers Hotel by an elevated walkway, allowing easy access to the Waterpark from both hotels.

=== Enchanted Village ===
The Enchanted Village open in April 2015, and contains 120 lodges and 5 secluded treehouses set in the fictional Enchanted Forest woodland. Situated next to the Alton Towers hotel, it features a variety of miniature playgrounds for children.

=== CBeebies Land Hotel ===
The CBeebies Land Hotel is situated at the back of the rock gardens behind the Alton Towers Hotel, and opened on 8 July 2017 with a total of 76 themed rooms. There are nine different themes: Bugbies, Bing, Octonauts, Postman Pat, Swashbuckle, In the Night Garden, Something Special, Bluey and Hey Duggee.

=== Stargazing Pods ===
Although Alton Towers had previously gained the necessary permits to expand the Enchanted Village, these plans were eventually scrapped and reduced into a "pod"-style accommodation option. 102 individual pods were constructed, each sleeping up to four people.

The proposals have faced some critical views from the public, with many criticisms being raised over the capacity of bathroom facilities as well as how the resort will cope with the increased demand in food and beverages, as the Stargazing Pods will not have its own restaurant, bar or shopping facilities. The council even initially rejected the application citing lack of imagination and "magic", although the plans were granted permission the second time without making any notable improvements.

The Stargazing Pods opened on 12 April 2019.

== Recreation ==
=== Alton Towers Spa ===
Alton Towers Spa was part of the Alton Towers Hotel and opened in 2004. It included relaxation and treatment rooms and an adults-only swimming pool. Despite being inside the Alton Towers Hotel, non-hotel guests were able to use the spa. It was closed on 31 December 2023 with the resort citing future development for the area.

=== Extraordinary Golf ===
Opened in 2007, the Extraordinary Golf mini-golf attraction is themed to different rides and attractions at the park, some of which, are from the park's history. Extraordinary Golf is located to the west of the Splash Landings Hotel. Extraordinary Golf was refreshed for 2016 including the addition of a Galactica themed hole.

== Future developments ==
Alton Towers is located in a Conservation Area, which puts restrictions on its permissible development, notably that no structures in the park should be built above tree line and if so should be disguised from external views of the park; this can be seen on the ride Rita, where the highest sections of track are camouflaged green.

Noise pollution is also a problem for the park due to the close proximity to the villages of Alton and Farley and the town of Cheadle. There have been several cases where Alton Towers have been taken to court over the noise levels emitted from the park and have been served noise abatement orders between 2004 and 2006.

Alton Towers has a tradition of codenaming its future roller coaster developments as "Secret Weapon", for example "SW6". The naming tradition began after "Secret Weapon" was the working title of a cancelled Arrow pipeline roller coaster, planned to open in around 1993, on what later became the Nemesis site.

In September 2022, Alton Towers held a public consultation to propose plans for an indoor attraction on the former site of the Alton Mouse, codenamed "Project Horizon". A planning application was submitted and later approved with conditions in June 2023. Construction has not yet started and no set opening has been announced.

== Events ==
=== Scarefest ===
Scarefest is the annual Halloween event held at Alton Towers. The event features a programme of seasonal scare attractions, live entertainment, themed décor, costumed performers, and extended evening opening hours.

Scarefest was formally introduced in 2007, although the resort had marked the Halloween season in earlier years. Its first dedicated scare maze, Terror of the Towers, debuted in 2002 and is widely regarded as the precursor to the modern event.

No full-scale Halloween event took place at the park in 2006. However, an unadvertised scare maze titled Room 13 operated exclusively for hotel guests that year, and returned in 2007 prior to the establishment of Scarefest as a named annual event.

Scarefest attraction history
Year	Attractions (number of seasons)							
2002	Terror of the Towers							
2003	Terror of the Towers: Bloodfest Banquet							
2004								
2005
2006
2007	Terror of the Towers: Bloodfest Banquet	The Field of 1000 Screams	Haunted Hollow Live					
2008	Terror of the Towers: Bloodfest Banquet	The Field of 1000 Screams	Haunted Hollow Live	The Boilerhouse	Duel Live			
2009	Terror of the Towers: What Lies Within	The Field of 1000 Screams		The Boilerhouse	Duel Live			
2010	Terror of the Towers: What Lies Within	Carnival of Screams		The Boilerhouse	Skelvin's Haunted Adventure			
2011	Terror of the Towers: What Lies Within	Carnival of Screams	Zombies Scare Zone	The Boilerhouse				
2012	Terror of the Towers: What Lies Within	Carnival of Screams	Zombies Scare Zone	The Sanctuary				
2013	Terror of the Towers: What Lies Within	Carnival of Screams	Zombies Scare Zone	The Sanctuary				
2014	Terror of the Towers: What Lies Within	Scary Tales Scare Zone	Zombies Scare Zone	The Sanctuary				
2015	Terror of the Towers: What Lies Within	Sub Species	The Haunting of Molly Crowe	Dark Apocalypse Scare Zone	Nox Inferous Scare Zone			
2016	Terror of the Towers: What Lies Within	Sub Species	Altonville Mine Tours	Dark Apocalypse Scare Zone	House of Monsters	Freak Show Scare Zone		
2017	Terror of the Towers: What Lies Within	Sub Species	Altonville Mine Tours	The Welcoming	House of Monsters	Freak Show Scare Zone		
2018	Project 42	Sub Species	Altonville Mine Tours	The Welcoming	House of Monsters			
2019	Project 42	Sub Species	Altonville Mine Tours	The Attic	Darkest Depths			
2020	Freak Show: Toxic Junkyard		Altonville Mine Tours	The Attic	Darkest Depths			
2021	Freak Show: Toxic Junkyard	Trick O' Treat Town	Altonville Mine Tours	The Attic	Darkest Depths			
2022	The Invitation	Trick O' Treat Town	Altonville Mine Tours	The Attic	Darkest Depths			
2023	The Invitation	Trick O' Treat Town	Altonville Mine Tours	The Attic	Darkest Depths	Daz Games: PANIC!	Burial Grounds Scare Zone	
2024	Compound	Trick O' Treat Town	Altonville Mine Tours	The Attic	Amigos in the Afterlife	Daz Games: PANIC!	Burial Grounds Scare Zone	
2025	Compound	Trick O' Treat Town	Altonville Mine Tours	Edge of the Forest	Amigos in the Afterlife	Dark Hollow Scare Zone	Burial Grounds Scare Zone	
2026	Compound	Trick O' Treat Town	Altonville Mine Tours	Edge of the Forest	Amigos in the Afterlife	Dark Hollow Scare Zone	Burial Grounds Scare Zone	Final Exhibit

– Previous Scarefest attraction. – Current Scarefest attraction.

=== Other events ===
==== Fireworks ====
For the final few days of the season, Alton Towers host firework shows, which have been running annually since the 1990s on the Great Lawns. The shows were reduced to 3 a year following a court order in 2005. In 2006, the display was rebranded as Electric Towers, but then discontinued. However, the fireworks and laser show was reinstated in 2010 to celebrate the park's 30th anniversary and has returned to being an annual event.

==== Services Day ====
Since 2015, Alton Towers have opened the park for a Services Day; a day where a limited quantity of discounted tickets (fewer than on a usual season day) are sold to those who work in public services.

==== Concerts ====
Alton Towers has a history of hosting concerts since the 1960s. Alternative rock band James played to a crowd of 30,000 on 4 July 1992. Concerts in recent years have included the Alton Towers Live event in 2011 and 2013. In 2010, there was a 1980s concert for the 30th Anniversary featuring Rick Astley and Bananarama and also that year hosted a P!nk concert. In the past, these concerts were often held in the car park at an additional fee, however, more recently concerts have been held within the theme park. Artists that have performed there include Tina Turner and The Black Eyed Peas.

== Records held by the park ==
- World's largest polar fleece blanket.
- Corkscrew was the first double inverting coaster in Europe.
- The Flume was the world's longest log flume at roughly 730 metres at the time of opening. (1981)
- Nemesis was the first inverted coaster in Europe.
- Oblivion was the world's first B&M dive coaster, advertised as "the world's first vertical drop rollercoaster". It also holds the record for most couples renewing their wedding vows on a rollercoaster.
- Galactica was the world's first B&M flying coaster.
- TH13TEEN had the first "freefall drop" track element on a rollercoaster.
- The Smiler is the coaster with the most inversions in the world at 14.

== Incidents ==
=== The Smiler ===
In June 2015, a serious collision occurred on The Smiler roller coaster, resulting in injuries to sixteen people. Two of the injured riders later required leg amputations as a consequence of their injuries.

Merlin Entertainments initially issued a press statement attributing the incident to "human error". The accident prompted a temporary closure of the park, a Health and Safety Executive investigation, and subsequent legal proceedings. However, the Health and Safety Executive concluded the crash occurred due to Merlin failing to put proper processes into place for operating the ride. During the subsequent court case, Merlin retracted their statement and pleaded guilty to a breach of health and safety law. The company was fined £5 million, with the court citing a "catalogue of errors" with Merlin's operating procedure and training.

In June 2017, Nick Leslau, whose Prestbury vehicle then held the Alton Towers freehold, repeated the discredited claim that the crash was due to "a human error", but added that "Merlin has paid a massive price, but the performance of the business has been exemplary and the share price is now at an all-time high."

=== Sky Ride ===
On 30 June 2004, due to a strong gust of wind, the Sky Ride cables became caught, jamming the ride. About 80 people were on the ride, and nine people had to be rescued by being abseiled down 200 foot (61 m) cables.

On 28 October 2007, a fire broke out in the Forbidden Valley Skyride station, leading to a partial evacuation of the park.

On 21 July 2009, a fire broke out in the Fountain Square station, leading to the entire station being destroyed. During the latter half of the 2009 season and over the following winter, a new station was designed and built, ready for the 2010 season.

On 11 August 2025, a small fire broke out in the toilets below the Forbidden Valley station, leading to a partial evacuation of the park. The building sustained minimal damage and reopened the next day after the fire was extinguished by firefighters.

=== Runaway Mine Train ===
On 20 July 2006, when the train was entering the tunnel section of its course, two carriages uncoupled, with the front half of the train continuing up the slope while the rear half remained in the tunnel. The front half failed to make it over the hill, rolled back and crashed into the stationary rear half. Six people were taken to hospital and 23 others were treated for cuts and bruises. Following the incident the Runaway Mine Train was closed for the rest of the season. The train was only returned to full length operation in June the following year.

=== Toxicator ===
On 15 March 2025, suspended top spin Toxicator was temporarily closed for several hours on its first day of operation. The closure was due to an incident involving a drainage and sewer overspill in the area directly beneath the attraction, during which raw sewage appeared to rise out of the ground. The ride resumed operation later the same day.

== Court cases ==
In 2004, a private prosecution was brought against the park by a couple from the local village of Farley over its noise level. Alton Towers was found guilty, with the judge singling out Oblivion in his judgement. The park were fined £5000, and was later issued a Noise Abatement Order limiting emissions to 32 dB. The fine was reduced to £3500 and the limit increased to 40 dB on appeal. The order led to the park removing a recording from Oblivion that was played before the rides drop as they believed it contributed to the noise by encouraging riders to scream.

The couple were later granted permission to bring an injunction hearing against the park to enforce the order in November 2011; however, there is no record of the case going ahead.

== Controversy ==
In early 2026, Merlin Entertainments, operator of Alton Towers Resort, introduced revised eligibility criteria for its Ride Access Pass (RAP), a scheme intended to provide queuing adjustments for disabled guests and those with medical needs. The changes removed automatic eligibility for visitors whose primary difficulty was described as "difficulty with crowds", prompting criticism from disability campaigners and organisations who argued the policy disproportionately affected people with non-visible disabilities, including autistic visitors and those with ADHD.

Following public backlash and national media coverage, Merlin stated the changes would operate as a temporary trial rather than a permanent policy and said the scheme would be reviewed following feedback from guests and disability groups.

== See also ==
- Incidents at European amusement parks
- List of theme parks in the United Kingdom
