= CBeebies Land =

Themed section at Alton Towers

Coordinates: 52.989956°N 1.893705°W

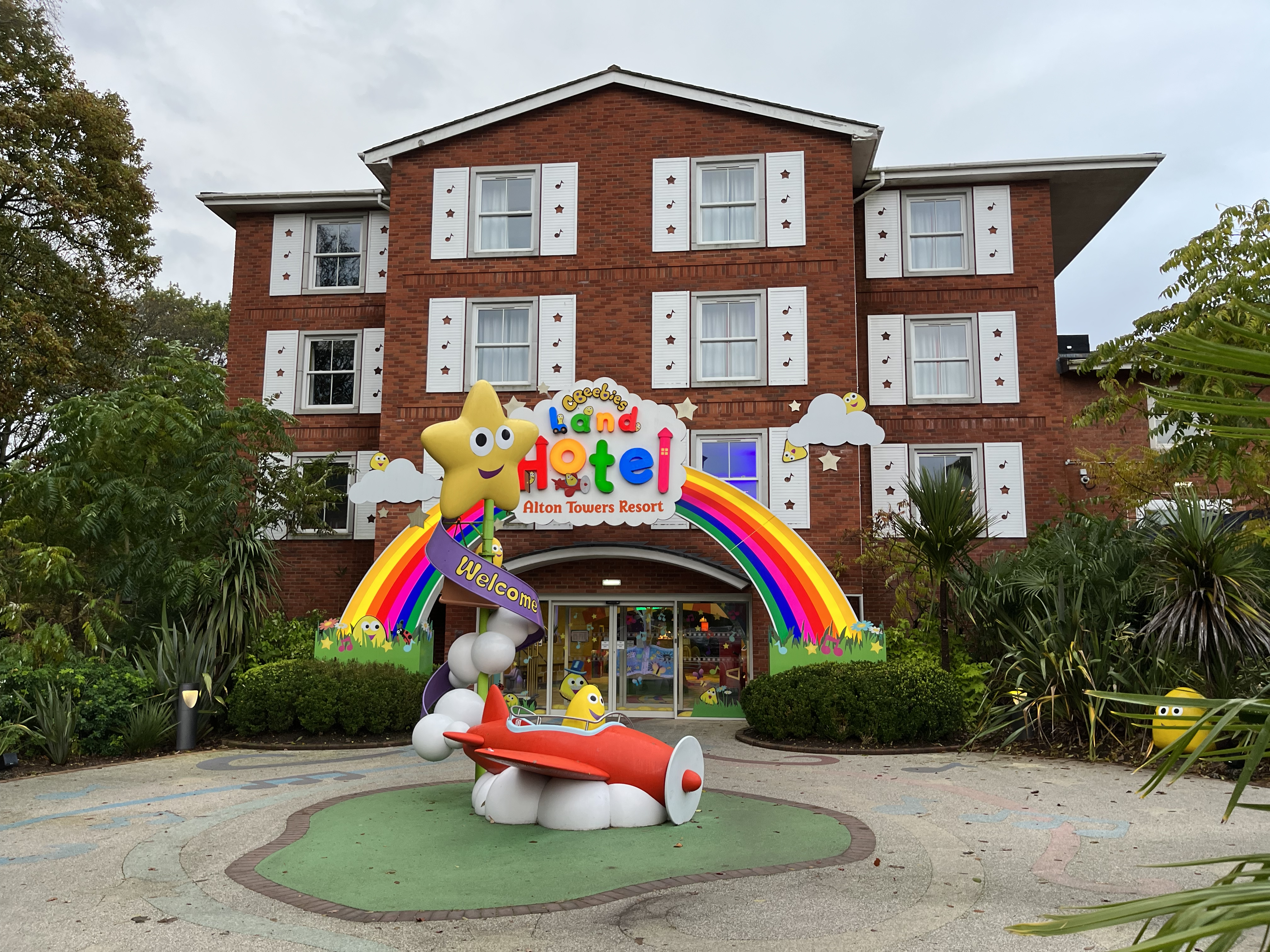
CBeebies Land Hotel, Alton Towers

CBeebies Land is a themed area located within the Alton Towers resort in Staffordshire, England. It is based on the CBeebies brand, a BBC television channel dedicated to pre-school children. The area features various rides, indoor and outdoor play areas, and live entertainment featuring characters from popular CBeebies shows.

== History ==
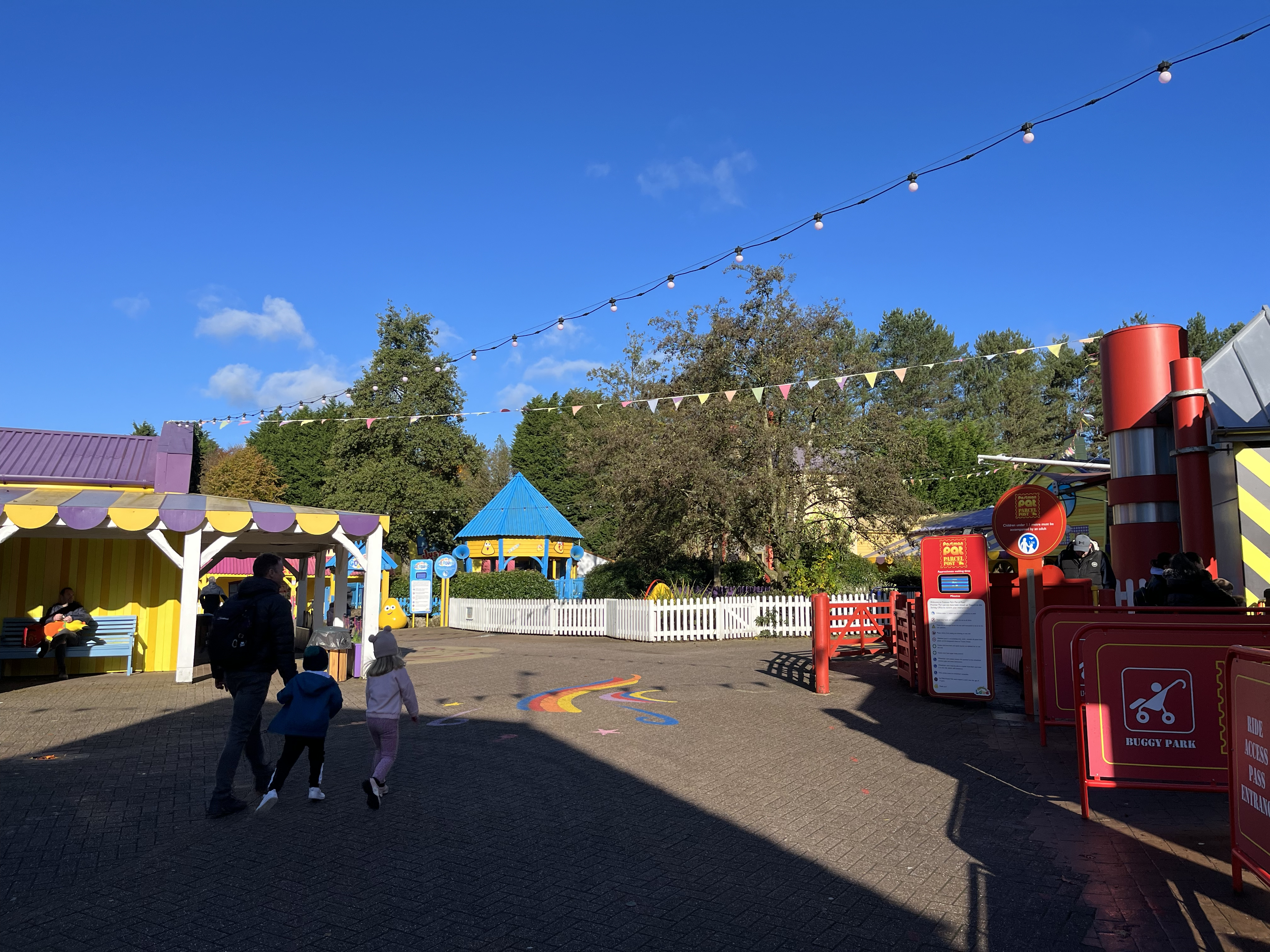
View of CBeebies Land

In October 2013, it was announced that Old MacDonald's Farmyard and Storybook Land would be permanently closed to make way for a new family area coming in 2014. In January 2014, it was announced that the new area would be called CBeebies Land. The project was a collaboration between Merlin Entertainments and BBC Worldwide (now BBC Studios).

The area officially opened to the public on 25 May 2014. In 2017, the theme was expanded beyond the park with the opening of the CBeebies Land Hotel, a 76-room on-site accommodation.

The area was expanded in Spring 2022 to add three new experiences: "Hey Duggee Big Adventure Badge", "Andy's Adventures Dinosaur Dig", and "JoJo & Gran Gran At Home".

== Attractions ==
The area contains several themed rides and walkthrough attractions:

=== Rides ===
- The Get Set Go Treetop Adventure – An Overhead railway track ride from the treetops of the Breakfast-Themed programming block called CBeebies Get Set Go.
- Octonauts Rollercoaster Adventure – A Zierer junior roller coaster themed to Octonauts.
- In the Night Garden Magical Boat Ride – A slow water transit ride based on In the Night Garden.
- Go Jetters Vroomster Zoom Ride – A rotating aerial ride themed to Go Jetters.
- Bluey The Ride: Here Come The Grannies – A Zierer junior roller coaster themed to Bluey.

=== Interactive & Play Areas ===
- Hey Duggee Big Adventure Badge – An outdoor play area themed to Hey Duggee.
- Something Special Sensory Garden – An interactive trail based on the show hosted by Justin Fletcher.
- Justin's House: Pie-O-Matic Factory – An indoor play area featuring foam ball shooters.

== Live Entertainment and shows ==
The Big Fun Showtime pavilion serves as the main hub for live performances. Daily shows feature appearances from characters such as Hey Duggee, the Teletubbies, and Bing.
