= Rita (roller coaster) =

Steel launched roller coaster

- Previously known as Rita: Queen of Speed (2005–2009)

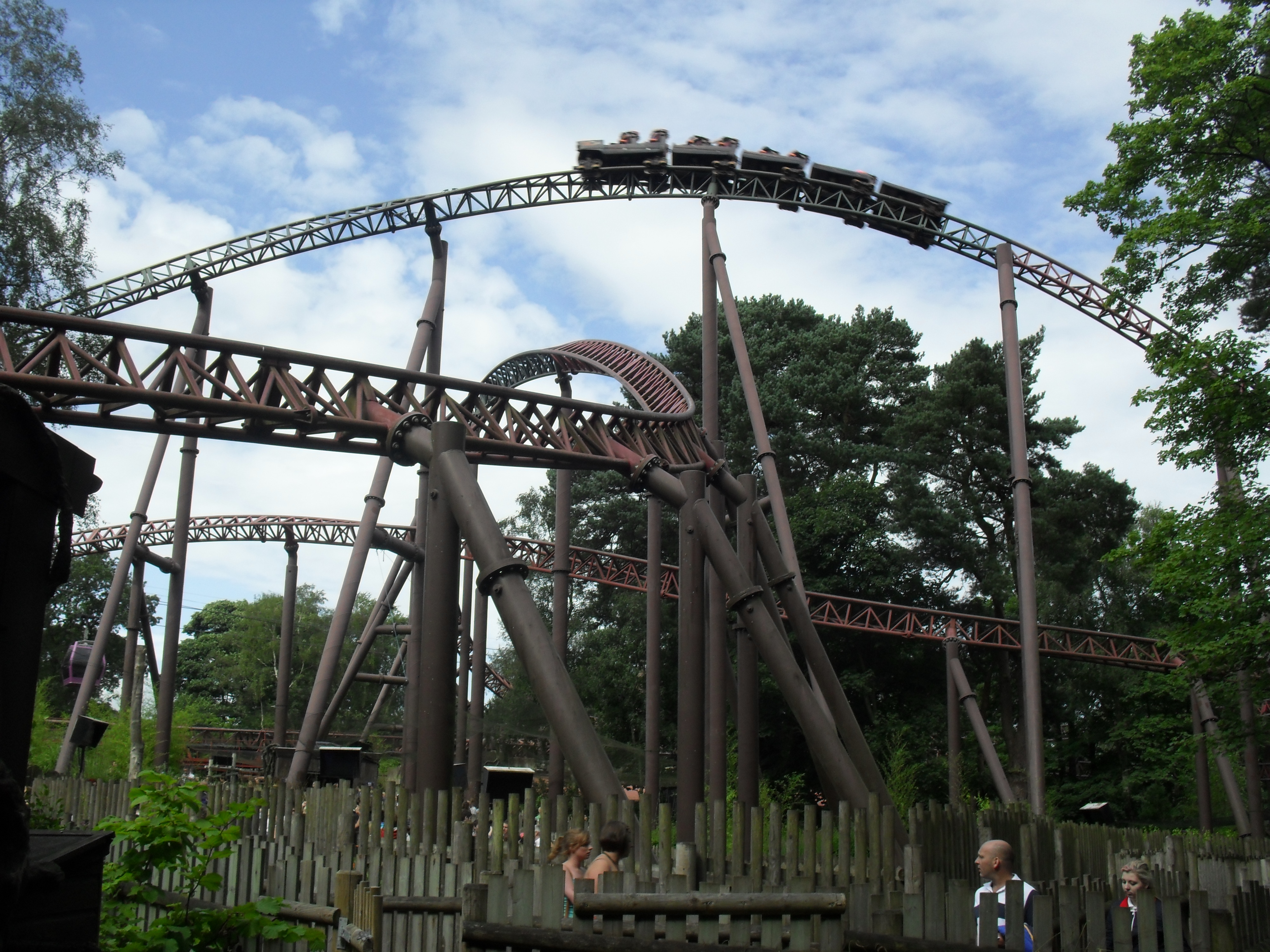
- Rita in 2012

Alton Towers
- Location: Alton Towers
- Park section: Dark Forest
- Coordinates: 52.9850°N 1.8905°W
- Status: Operating
- Opening date: 1 April 2005
- Cost: £8,000,000
- Replaced: Boneshaker

General statistics
- Type: Steel – Launched
- Manufacturer: Intamin
- Designer: Werner Stengel
- Model: Accelerator Coaster
- Track layout: Twister
- Lift/launch system: Hydraulic Launch
- Height: 18.4 m (60 ft)
- Length: 647 m (2,123 ft)
- Speed: 98.3 km/h (61.1 mph)
- Inversions: 0
- Duration: 0:25
- Capacity: 1,150 riders per hour
- Acceleration: 0 to 98.3 km/h (0 to 61 mph) in 2.5 seconds
- G-force: 4.7
- Height restriction: 140–195 cm (4 ft 7 in – 6 ft 5 in)
- Trains: 2 trains with 5 cars; riders arranged 2 across in 2 rows for a total of 20 riders per train
- Website: Official website
- Fastrack available
- Rita at RCDB

Rita, formerly known as Rita: Queen of Speed, is a launched roller coaster located in the Dark Forest section of Alton Towers amusement park in Staffordshire Moorlands, England. Designed by Intamin, the Accelerator Coaster model opened to the public on 1 April 2005. It features an acceleration from 0 to 98.3 km/h (61.1 mph) in 2.5 seconds. The ride is loosely-themed to a drag racing concept.

== Ride experience ==
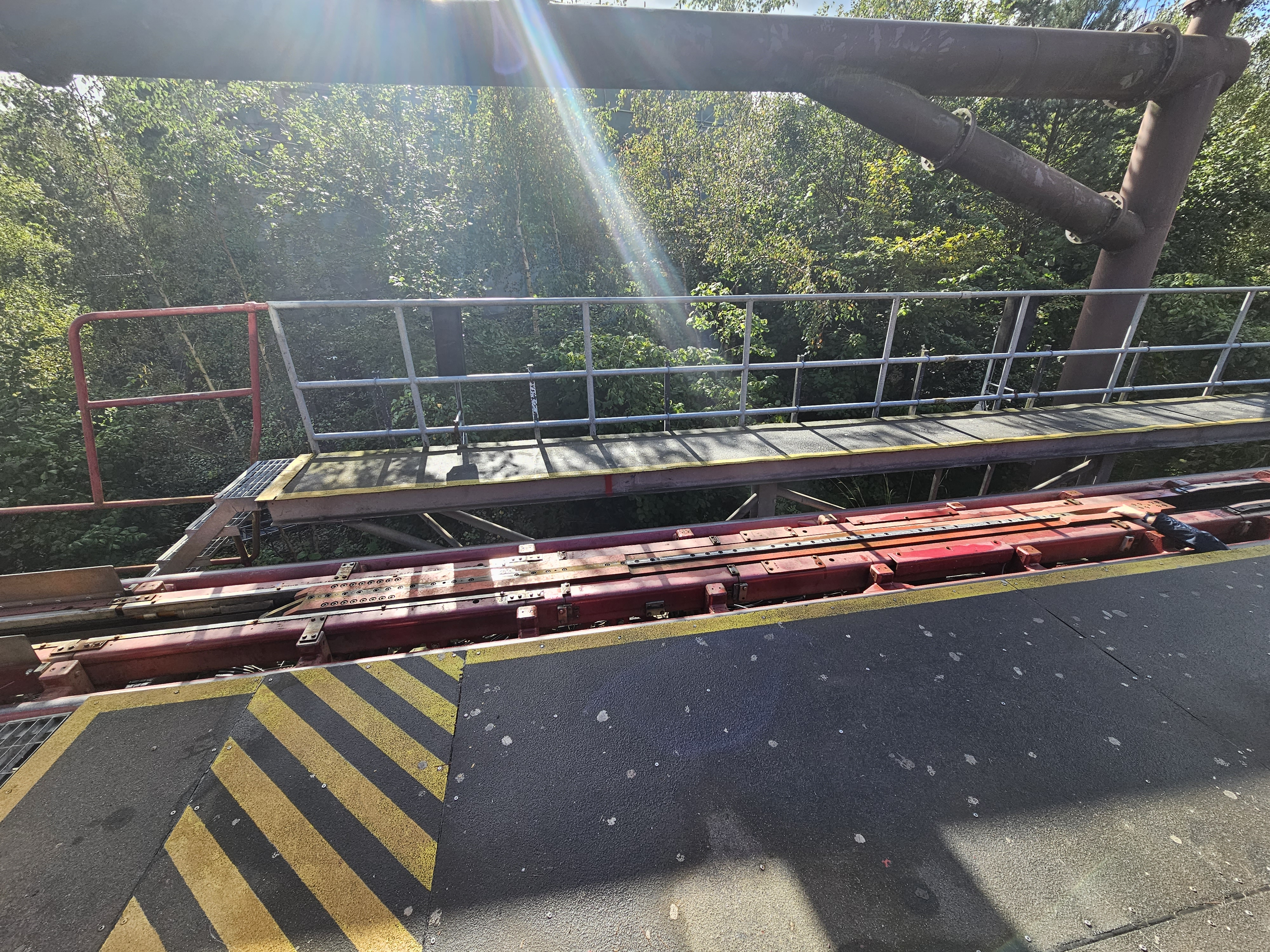
The catch-car of the Rita Roller Coaster at Alton Towers

Rita was Alton Towers' new attraction for the 2005 season, where it was marketed as "Your best Alton Towers ride ever". The ride starts with the train racing forward from the station area, accelerating from 0 to 98.3 km/h (61.1 mph) in 2.5 seconds, and negotiates high speed corners and air-time hills (the layout is a figure-of-8) before then reaching the brake run parallel with the station. Most of the track is painted red, but the highest parts of the track are painted dark green due to a rule which states that no roller coaster should be visible above the tree line. The original pre-launch voice was delivered in a motor racing commentary-style, counting down to the start of a drag race.

In 2010, the ride was subtly re-themed to align with the new Dark Forest area of Alton Towers, and theme of nearby Thirteen which opened in March that year. The ride control cabin and entrance were refurbished to look partially consumed by the branches of the supernatural Dark Forest. As well as the control cabin and Rita tyres being rethemed to suit the Dark Forest, the ride's trains have been rethemed with a darker grey tint to the bottom of the cars with forest stains over the flames. The trains still have the blue and purple cars with flames but with a tint of grey-brown to make Rita look damaged by the supernatural forest. The voiceover heard before the ride launches was also changed to match the more sinister theme. The message before launch is "Keep your head back! Hold on tight! You MUST escape! Go, go, go!".

According to Alton Towers, the ride's maximum capacity is 1,150 riders per hour.

== History ==
In September 2004 UG Land was stripped of almost all of its attractions including The UG Bugs, The Bone Shaker and Lava Lump preparing for a major new ride. The only rides that remained were the Corkscrew and the UG Swinger.

On 1 April 2005 Rita Queen of Speed opened to the public and 'UG Land and the Thunder Rock Rally' was formed, incorporating the new ride, Corkscrew, and a number of other rides which would be removed in the following years.

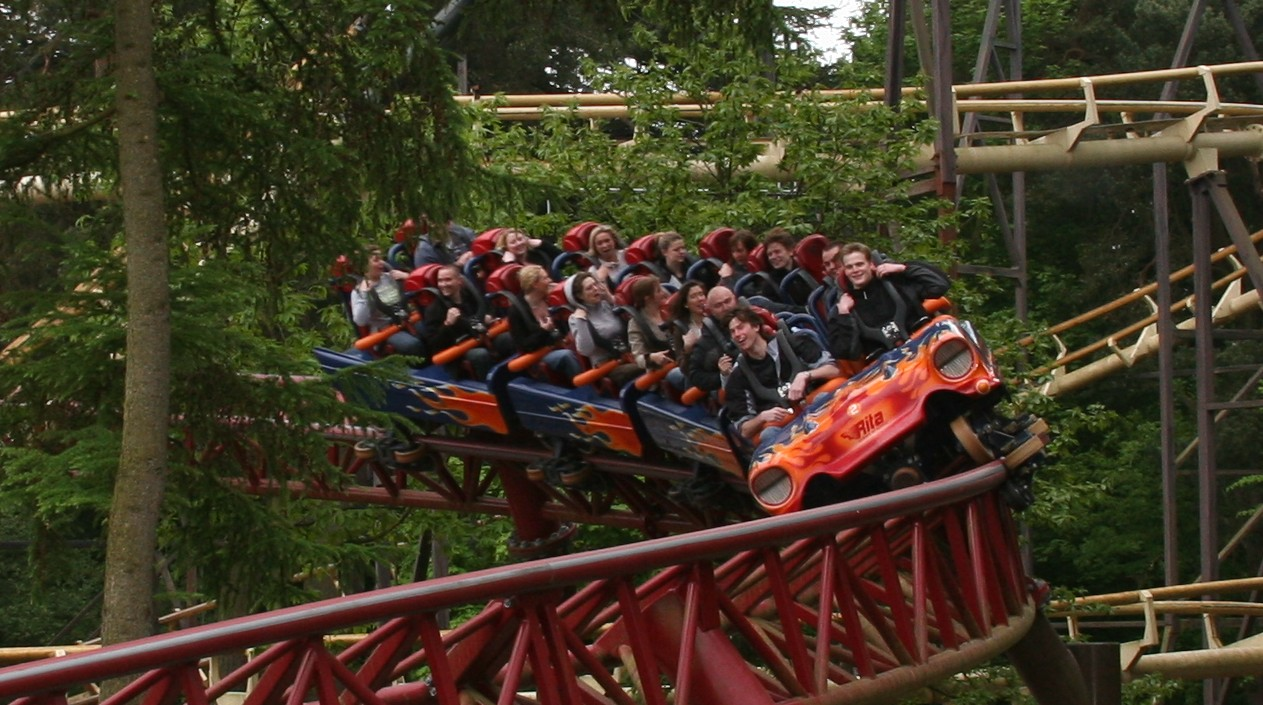
Rita as Rita Queen of Speed: 2005-2009

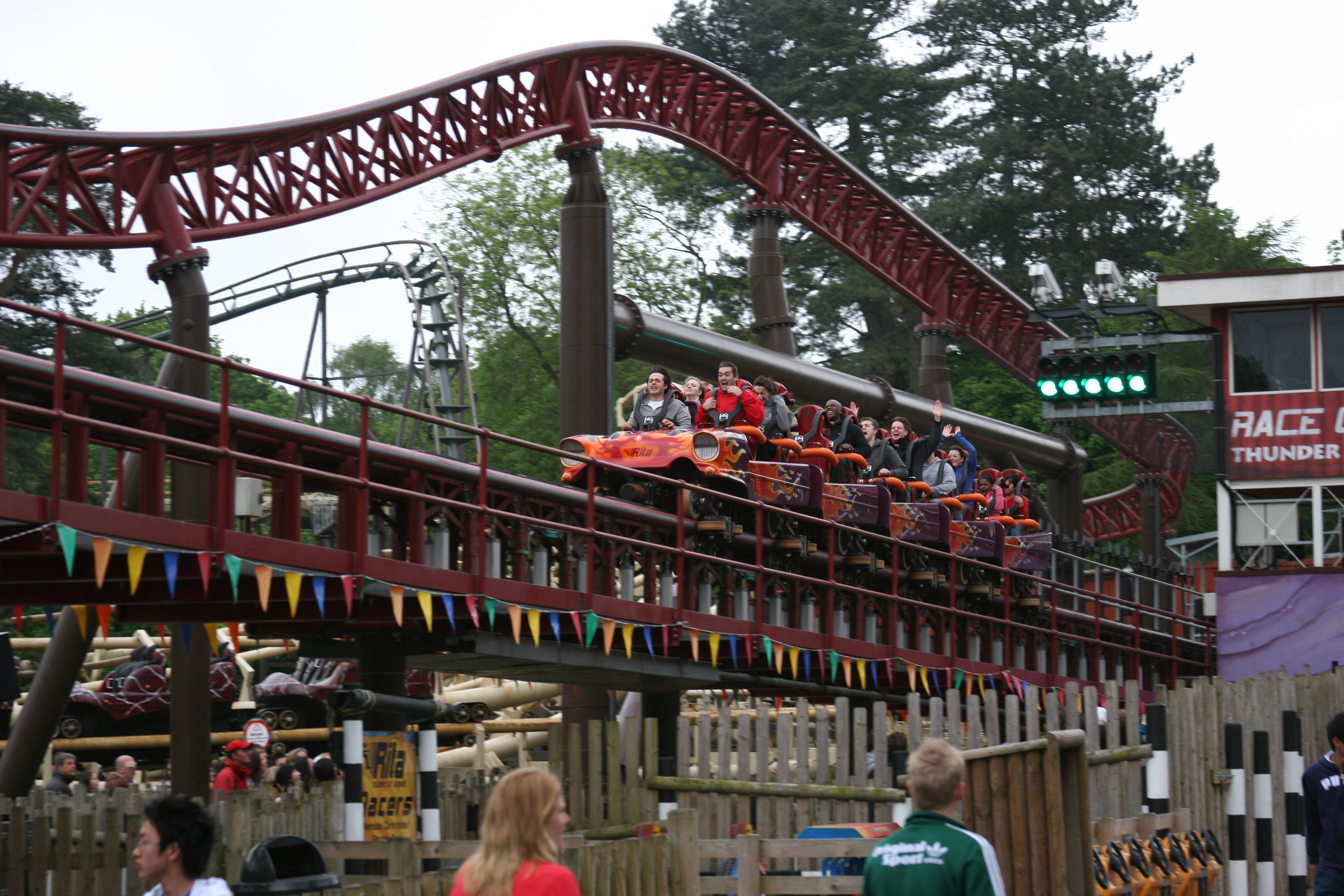
Rita launching with Corkscrew 1980-2008 in background.

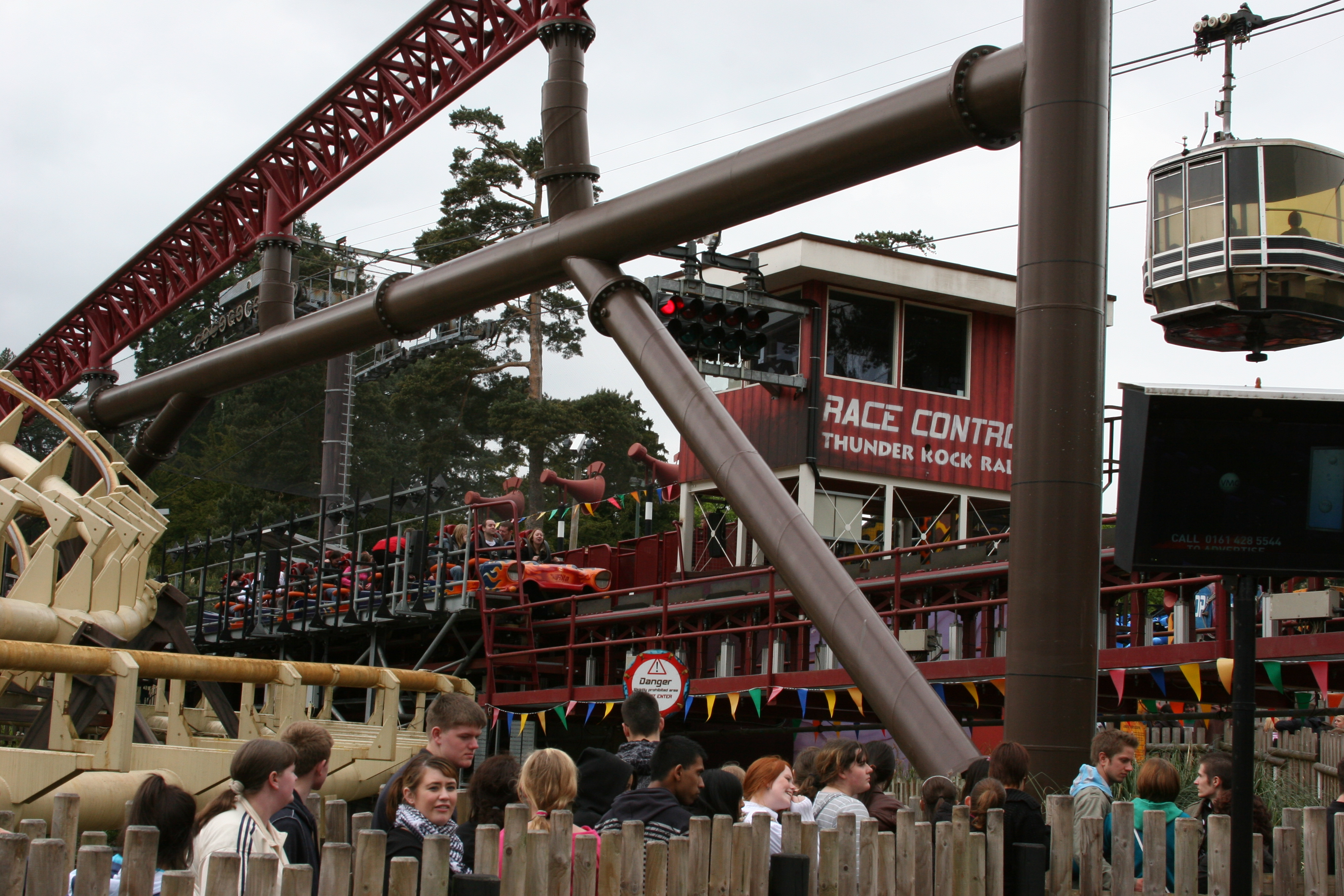
Rita Queen of Speed from the queue line

The ride was temporarily renamed "Camilla - Queen of Speed" on 8 April 2005 as a PR stunt to celebrate the marriage of Prince Charles to Camilla Parker Bowles.

In March 2010, following a change of the area to the Dark Forest, the "Queen of Speed" suffix was dropped from the ride's name, and Rita (as it is now known) received a retheme, with a redecorated entrance, queue line, station, control room and cars.

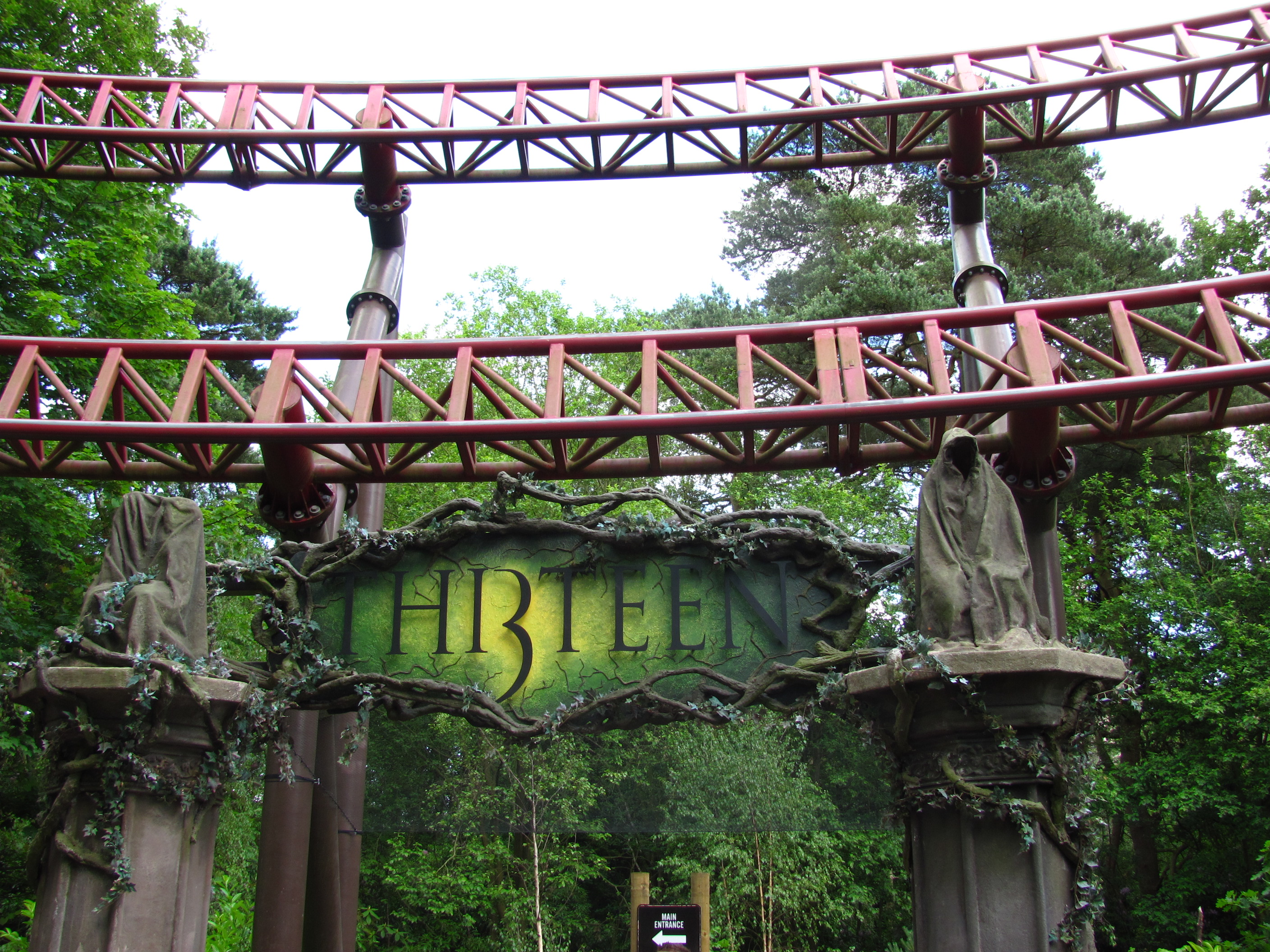
Th13teen entrance with Rita above.

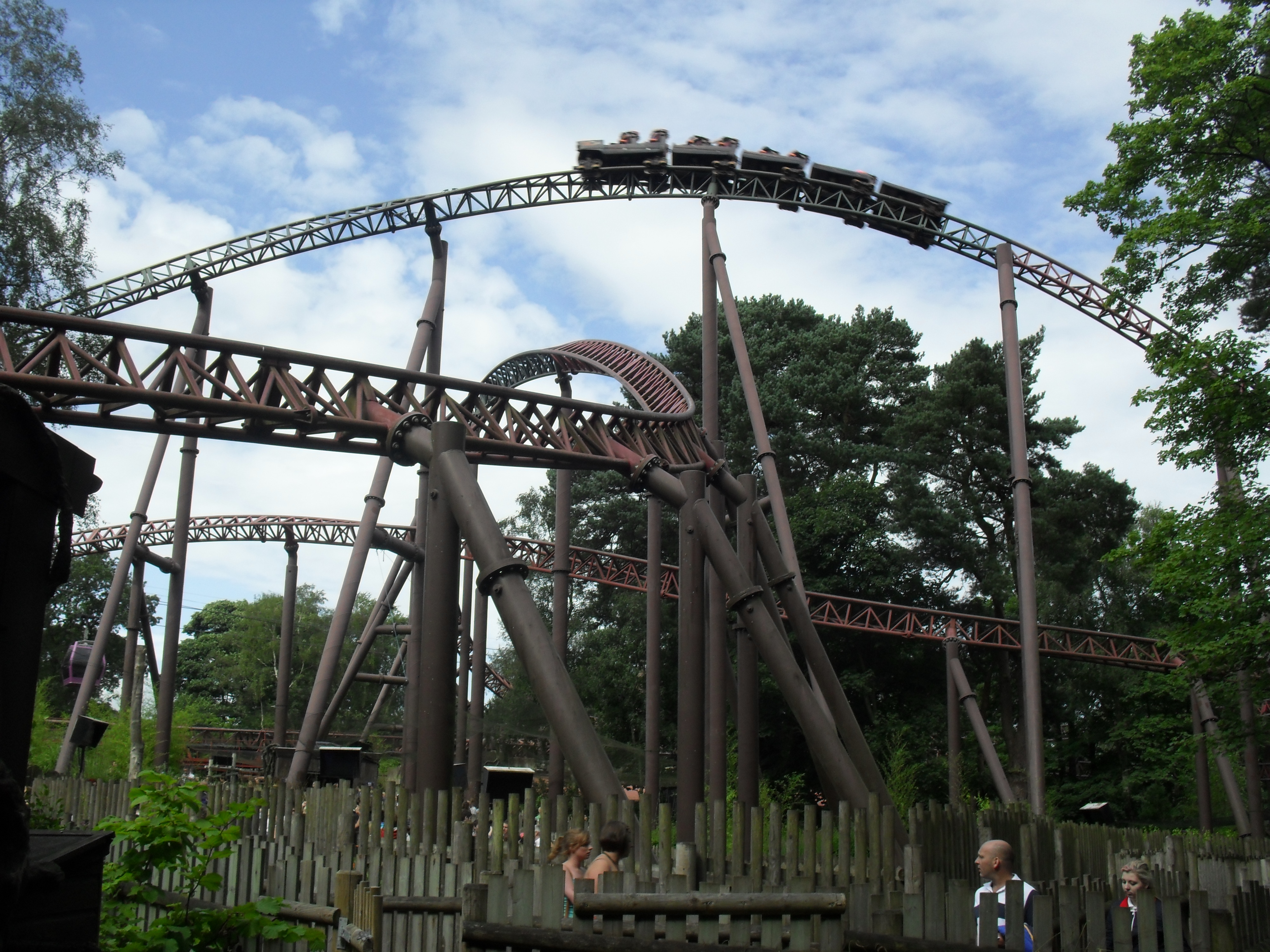
Rita 2009–present in Dark Forest

== Incidents ==
On the morning of 24 July 2012, the ride's launch cable snapped during testing while attached to an empty train. A similar incident also happened in 2005. No injuries were reported, but the incidents were similar to the 2009 failure of the Xcelerator rollercoaster's launch cable in the United States. Rita re-opened on 26 July 2012.
