= Black Hole (roller coaster) =

Defunct roller coaster

- Previously known as: Black Hole II; New Black Hole
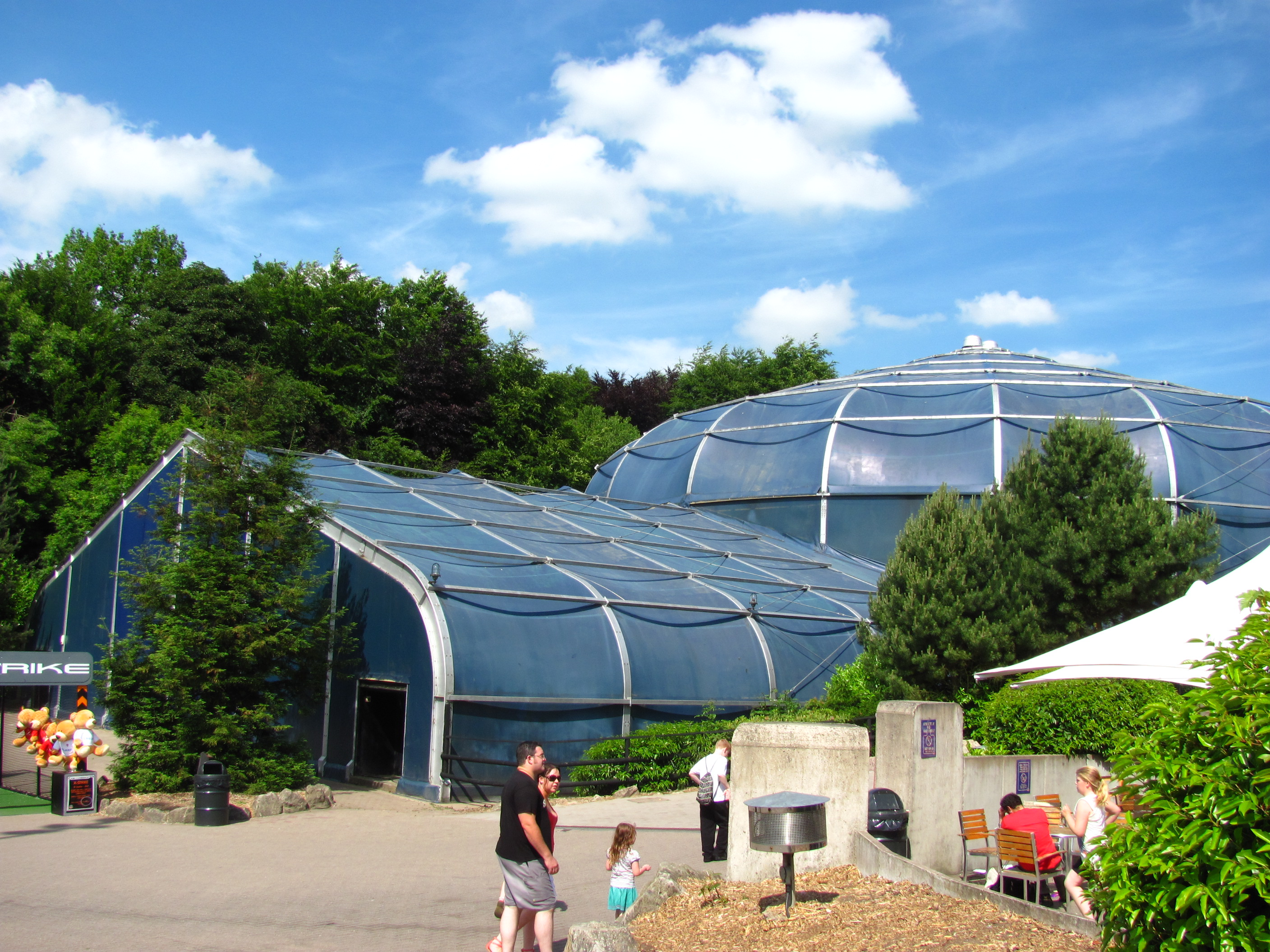
- View of Black Hole's exterior

Alton Towers
- Location: Alton Towers
- Park section: X-Sector
- Coordinates: 52°59′14.1″N 1°53′43.2″W
- Status: Removed
- Opening date: 20 March 1984
- Closing date: 5 March 2005
- Replaced: Dinosaur Land
- Replaced by: The Smiler

General statistics
- Type: Steel – Enclosed
- Manufacturer: Anton Schwarzkopf
- Designer: Werner Stengel
- Model: Jet Star 2
- Track layout: Twister
- Lift/launch system: Electric spiral lift
- Height: 13.5 m (44 ft)
- Length: 585 m (1,919 ft)
- Inversions: 0
- Duration: 1:50
- Capacity: 900 riders per hour
- Height restriction: 42 in (107 cm)
- Black Hole at RCDB

Black Hole, briefly known as Black Hole II (1988) and New Black Hole (1989), was an enclosed steel roller coaster located at Alton Towers theme park near Alton in the English shire county of Staffordshire, United Kingdom. Manufactured by Anton Schwarzkopf and designed by Werner Stengel, the Jet Star 2 model opened to public in 1984 and operated until 2005. The track layout was enclosed within a large tent-like structure to provide a dark ride experience. The structure was a large green and yellow PVC-covered structure (which was re-themed in 1998 and re-coloured in blue), designed by Rudi Enos.

== History ==
Taking the place of the former Dinosaur Land attraction, which had then been moved into storage, the modular steel track for Black Hole was constructed by Anton Schwarzkopf. The roller coaster was given a space theme and debuted at the park in 1984.

In 1985, the bottom of the first drop was modified slightly to make the ride run more smoothly. Lights were also added to the lift, so that riders were able to brace themselves for the first drop. For the 1988 season, Black Hole was dismantled and transported to Europe, where it had an overhaul by BHS (later becoming Maurer Söhne) of Peißenberg in Germany, to accommodate dual-car trains. The reconstructed roller coaster reopened, and was briefly named Black Hole II in 1988, and then New Black Hole in 1989, before reverting to its original name.

The opening of Oblivion in 1998 led to the redevelopment of Fantasy World, which became known as X-Sector. Black Hole underwent another refurbishment and was integrated into the new themed area. The colour scheme of the original tent was changed from yellow and green to a dark blue, and the entrance was revamped to reflect the X-Sector theme. Its interior was redesigned, featuring a modified queue layout and station, which were restyled with a Jules Verne theme.

In later years, the Black Hole became costly to maintain, and the park decided to close the attraction in 2005. The roller coaster track was dismantled and sold in 2007. There were no confirmed plans to reuse the site, and the tent remained unused for several years.

During a question-and-answer session in 2010 celebrating the opening of TH13TEEN, it was confirmed by John Wardley and then-marketing director Morwenna Angove that preparation for a new roller coaster in 2013 had begun, and that the former site of Black Hole was being considered for the location. A planning application for the Black Hole site was submitted in early 2012 and approved by Staffordshire Moorlands District Council. The large tent which housed the now former Black Hole was eventually dismantled in April 2012 to make way for The Smiler.

== Scare mazes ==
During the park's annual Halloween Scarefest event in October 2011, the former Black Hole tent was used to house two temporary scare maze attractions. This was the first time the structure had been put to public use since the attraction's closure in March 2005.

== Relocation ==
After a renovation from Gerstlauer, the former Black Hole ride was transported to Sweden and reopened as Rocket at Furuvik Zoo on 21 May 2011.

In late 2021, Furuvik Zoo put the rollercoaster up for sale.
