= Charlie and the Chocolate Factory: The Ride =

Removed dark boat ride

- The entrance to Charlie and the Chocolate Factory: The Ride.

Alton Towers
- Area: Cloud Cuckoo Land
- Status: Removed
- Cost: £8 million
- Opening date: 1 April 2006
- Closing date: 8 November 2015
- Replaced: Toyland Tours
- Replaced by: The Alton Towers Dungeon

Ride statistics
- Attraction type: Dark boat ride, Elevator
- Manufacturers: Mack Rides (boat ride); Rexroth Bosch Group (simulators)
- Designer: Tussauds Studios (boat ride); Falcon's Treehouse (simulators)
- Theme: Charlie and the Chocolate Factory
- Capacity: 1000 riders per hour
- Vehicle type: Boat, Elevator
- Vehicles: 10 boats, 2 elevators
- Riders per vehicle: 9
- Duration: 11 minutes

Charlie and the Chocolate Factory: The Ride was a dark ride located in the Cloud Cuckoo Land area of Alton Towers theme park, Staffordshire, England. It was based upon the famous 1964 Roald Dahl book of the same name, and took its thematic inspiration from the illustrations of Quentin Blake. The ride closed at the end of the 2015 season and was replaced by the Alton Towers Dungeon in 2019.

== History ==
The building initially housed the Around the World in 80 Days attraction and later Toyland Tours. The layout was modified when it was redeveloped into 'Charlie and the Chocolate Factory.' Mack Rides, the engineer responsible for the original ride's hardware in 1981, returned to incorporate a new offload point towards the ride's conclusion, enabling guests to transition into the new simulator experience.

From 2016, Charlie And The Chocolate Factory: The Ride did not open, with mixed reasons given for its closure. The ride stood standing but not operating for 3 years before the building and associated boat ride were re-themed into The Alton Towers Dungeon, which opened in 2019.

Various props from the ride were put on sale at auction on 13 February 2019 to raise money for Merlin's Magic Wand.

== Ride ==
The ride was split into two segments, the first being a boat ride along the chocolate river inside Willy Wonka's Chocolate Factory. Passengers encountered all the characters from the book (going from Augustus Gloop to Veruca Salt) as either simple animatronics or CGI projections. After disembarking the boats the second segment began with a short pre-show video (involving Mike Teavee). The video was presented in a way that made it look like as if the viewers were actually trapped within the TV set. The ride continued inside one of the two "Great Glass Elevators" which simulated passengers taking an airborne trip through the rest of the factory. Each elevator was a static room with semi-translucent walls and ceiling on which CGI animations were projected from the outside, and only the floor slightly trembled to give the impression of movement.
