= Alton Towers Waterpark =

Water park at Alton Towers Resort

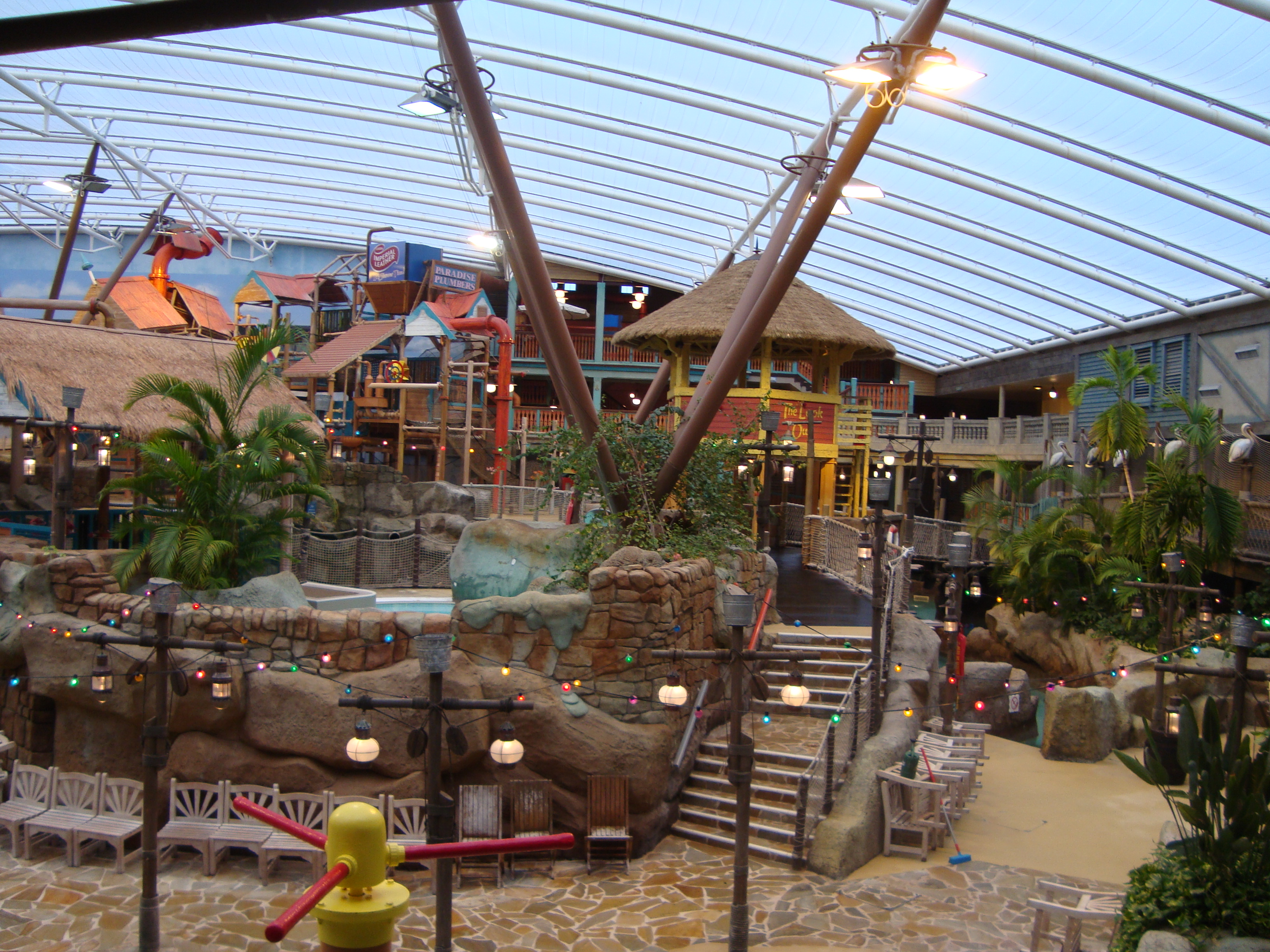
- Location: Alton Towers Resort, Staffordshire, England
- Coordinates: 52.9851°N 1.8761°W
- Owner: Merlin Entertainments
- Opened: 1 June 2003
- Previous names: Cariba Creek
- Operating season: All year round
- Pools: 7 pools
- Water slides: 10 water slides
- Website: www.altontowers.com/waterpark/

Alton Towers Waterpark, previously known as Cariba Creek, is a water park at Alton Towers Resort, in Staffordshire, England. It is themed to a tropical lagoon, adjoining the Splash Landings Hotel with indoor and outdoor water features.

== History ==
Following the opening of the Alton Towers Hotel in 1996, plans were developed for a second hotel, including a water park. Originally named Splash Landings, the name of the water park changed to Cariba Creek when the hotel was forced to drop the Calypso Springs name early in 2003.

Alongside the new hotel, the water park opened in June 2003, but suffered a temporary closure whilst outstanding construction work was completed. At opening, the water park was only available to hotel guests. In 2004, the park made tickets available to all visitors.

In summer 2009, the park received media attention for a decision to ban men wearing swim briefs.

In 2013, the water park celebrated its 10th anniversary.

== Rides and attractions ==
- Lagoona Bay – The main tropical pool, with water cannons, geysers and waterfalls.
- Wacky Waterworks Treehouse – A wooden 'treehouse' with watercannons, and other interactive features to squirt passing people with.
- The Little Leak – A mini Lagoona Bay for little children.
- Bubbly Wubbly Pool – An outdoor heated pool & whirlpool.
- The Master Blaster – A 'watercoaster', similar to the Master Blaster at Sandcastle WaterPark, Blackpool and Nucleus at Waterworld and is the main attraction of the Waterpark. The Master Blaster is a high-speed water flume that contains sharp turns, drops and dark sections.
- Volcanic Springs – Indoor heated hot pool.
- Lazy River (Calypso Creek) – A Slow Water Feature, where it takes you underneath water jets and buckets of water.
- Flash Floods – Outdoor pool with two slides leading to the middle pool and three leading to the bottom.
- The Tipping Bucket – A very big bucket is filled with 1000 litres of water and then tips its contents over people standing below.
- Rush & Rampage – 2 single ring slides where riders experience wide turns.

== Food & Drink ==
In 2016 a new cafe opened called Adventurers Cave, located opposite the changing rooms at the front of the waterpark. It takes up a space that was previously a staff only area.

The previous food & drink establishment "The Original Sandwich Co.", which was located within the waterpark atrium has been replaced with the Ice Cream Shack.

== Future ==
Over the last few years, the Waterpark has drawn up several ideas to improve and add to the park. This includes a large 'half pipe'-style slide, for which a planning application was submitted but later withdrawn. Over the 2010 winter period, new turnstiles were added to control crowd flow into the waterpark and the pool floor has been replaced. At the start of 2013 a 3-week close-down took place within the Waterpark where the following was done; New lighting, new flooring, new stairs, and a lot of painting and general maintenance.
