= Marauder's Mayhem (Alton Towers) =

Spinning Teacups flat ride

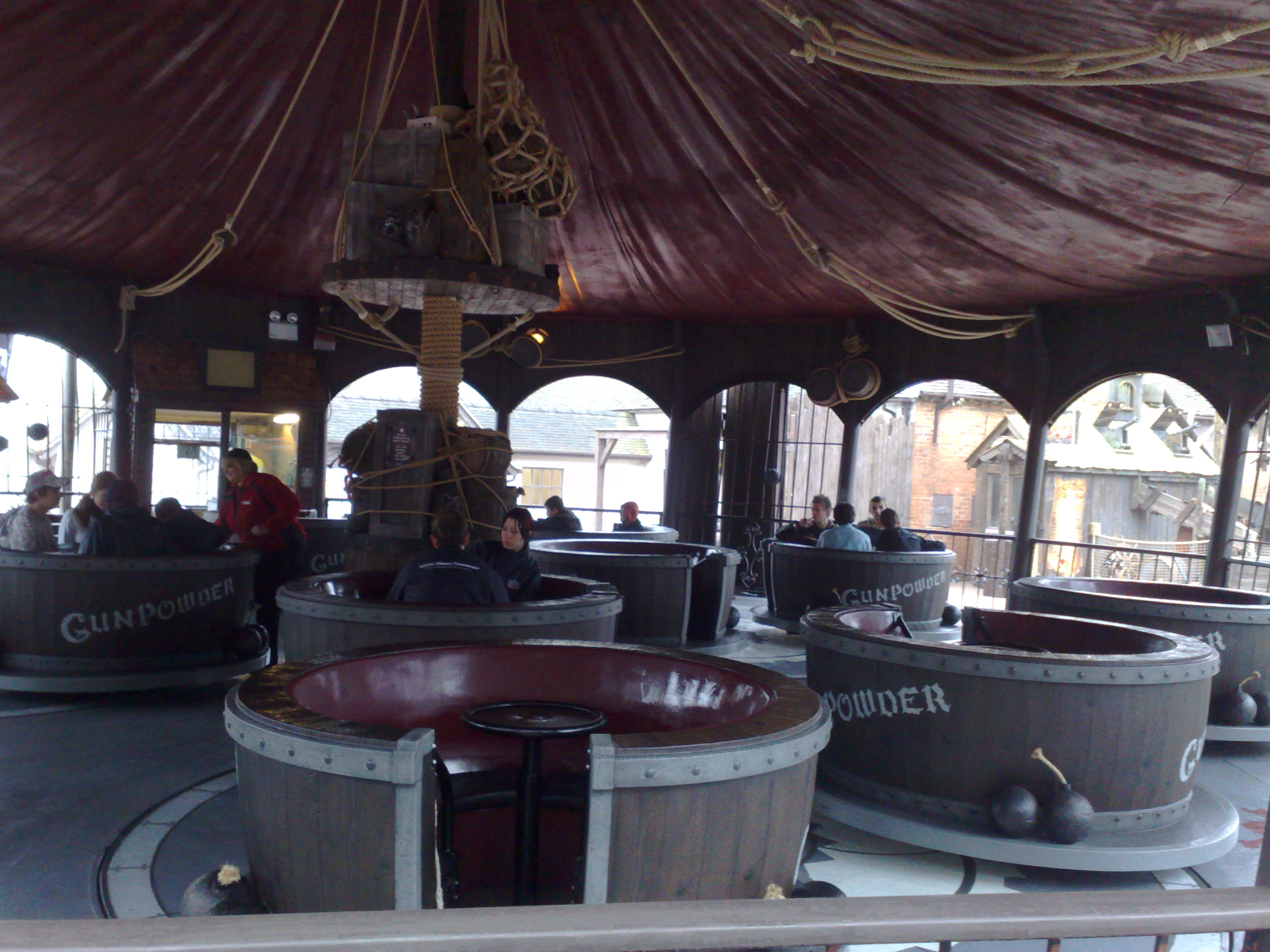
- Maurader's Mayhem in Mutiny Bay

Alton Towers
- Area: Mutiny Bay
- Coordinates: 52.989765°N 1.890223°W
- Status: Operating
- Opening date: 28 March 1987 (as Tea Cup Ride); 15 March 2008 (refurbished)
- Replaced: Tea Cup Ride

Ride statistics
- Attraction type: Teacups ride
- Designer: Mack Rides
- Capacity: 1,200 riders per hour
- Vehicle type: Barrel-themed spinning teacups
- Vehicles: 12
- Riders per vehicle: 5
- Duration: 2:00
- Height restriction: 110 cm (3 ft 7 in)
- Manufacturer: Mack Rides; Rexroth Bosch Group
- Fastrack available

Marauder's Mayhem is an operating spinning teacups ride at the British theme park Alton Towers. It is located in the pirate-themed Mutiny Bay.

== History ==
The ride opened in 1987, when park expansion was increasing every year. The demolition of an old toilet block left a space in the AquaLand area, and the Mack Rides' Teacups ride was installed.

It seemed from the design on the ride, that the Merrie England theme was in mind from as early as the mid-eighties. The original theming of the ride entailed the traditional spinning cups and saucers. The ride stayed the same for over 20 years, until the area's retheme into Mutiny Bay prompted a different 'look', in the form of an exploding barrels theme.

The 12 barrels are able to hold up to 5 adults each, allowing for 60 guests per cycle, however this may be increased to 6 riders per barrel as long as some of the guests are children.

== Ride Experience ==
Riders can choose the speed of the spinning barrels by turning the wheel in the centre of the barrel. There are twelve barrels in total, where five riders can be seated. Riders between 1.1m and 1.3m must be accompanied by an adult, but anyone over 1.3m can ride unaccompanied. Fastrack is available on the ride.

== Location ==
Maurauder's Mayhem is located in the centre of Mutiny Bay, adjacent to the rock n' tug ride, Heave Ho!. It is also close to the Eastern Express restaurant and the Sharkbait Reef by Sea Life attraction since 2009.

Since 2018, the Wicker Man roller coaster is also located near the ride in the same area of Mutiny Bay.

Other facilities surrounding the attraction include the toilets, Mutiny Bay Donuts and the Courtyard Hot Dogs, Wraps and Waffles.
