= Battle Galleons =

Splash battle water ride

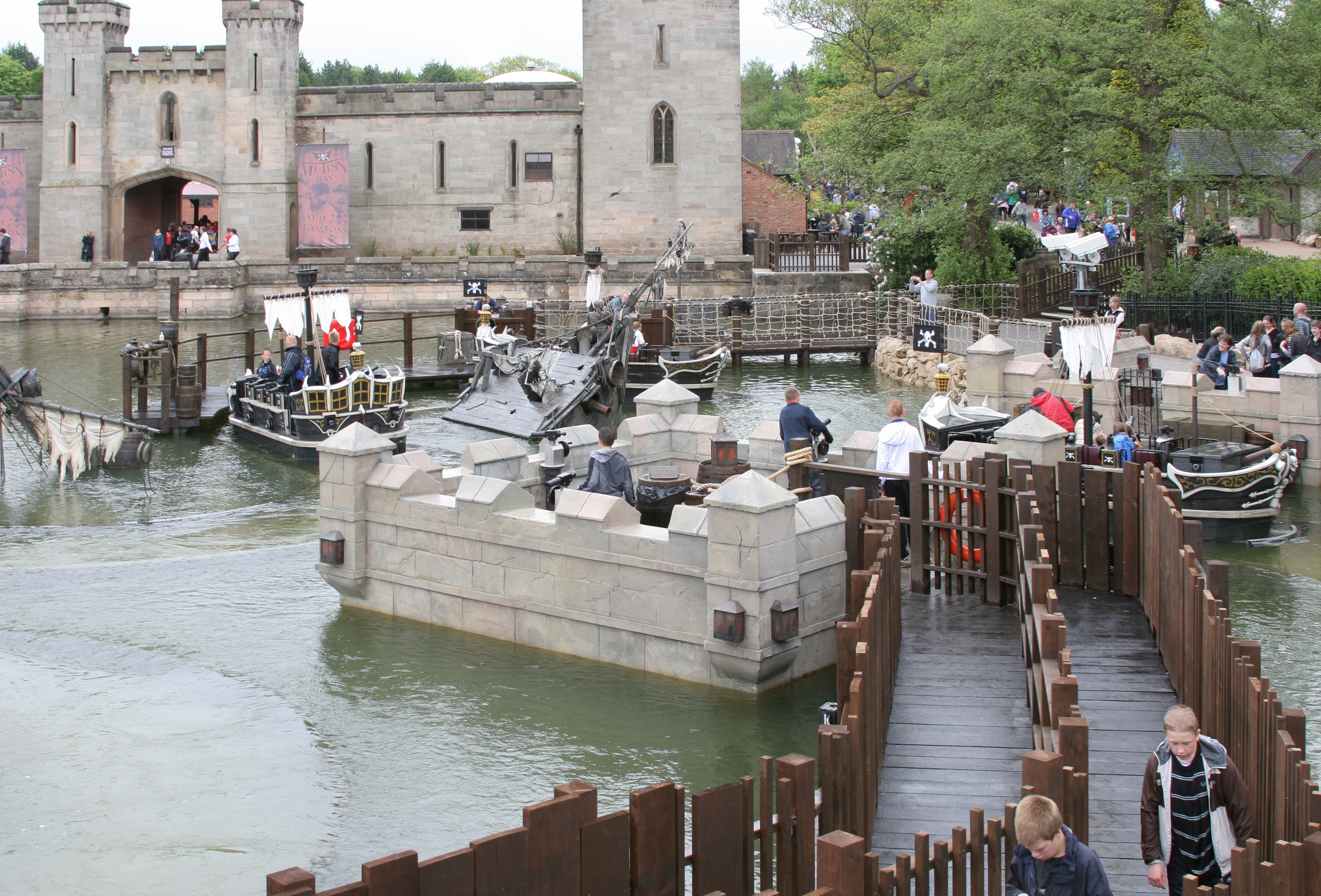

Alton Towers
- Coordinates: 52.988412°N 1.890432°W
- Status: Operating
- Opening date: 2008
- Replaced: Splash Kart Challenge

Ride statistics
- Attraction type: Splash Battle
- Manufacturer: Mack Rides
- Capacity: 800 riders per hour
- Vehicles: 8 boats
- Riders per vehicle: 8 per boat
- Duration: 3 minutes
- Height restriction: 90 cm (2 ft 11 in)
- Manufacturer: MACK Rides
- Fastrack available

Battle Galleons is a water ride at the British theme park Alton Towers. The ride was installed in 2008, replacing the pay-per-play ride Splash Kart Challenge, which in turn replaced the original Swan Boat ride.

Located in the Mutiny Bay area, it follows a pirate ship theme. Riders and observers are able to fire water guns at each other.
