= Driving School (Alton Towers) =

Driving school car ride

Coordinates: 52.985273°N 1.893261°W

Cuckoo Cars Driving School
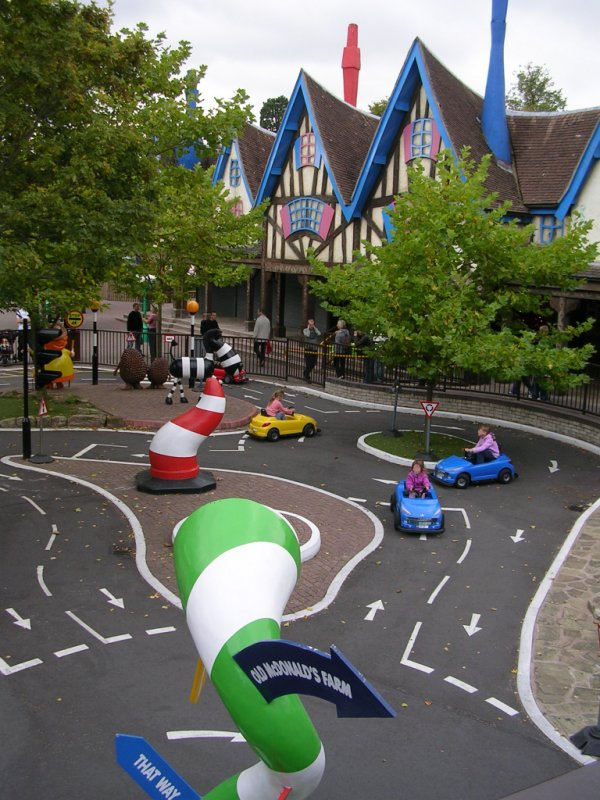
- The ride in its original form

Alton Towers Resort
- Name: Peugeot 207 Driving School (2006–2009); Peugeot Driving School (2010–2011); Alton Towers Driving School (2012–2016)
- Area: The Towers
- Status: Operating
- Opening date: July 2006
- Replaced: Vintage Cars

Ride statistics
- Attraction type: Kiddie ride, driving attraction
- Manufacturer: SB International AB
- Theme: Driver's education
- Vehicle type: Car
- Riders per vehicle: 1

The Cuckoo Cars Driving School (originally named the Peugeot 207 Driving School and later the Alton Towers Driving School) is a ride at Alton Towers for young children. It is styled as a mock driving institution where young children learn how to drive small cars. Riders are allowed to drive around a miniature course overseen by staff.

== History ==
The attraction was opened in July 2006 as the Peugeot 207 Driving School, sponsored by Peugeot, with riders driving in vehicles modelled after the Peugeot 207. The name was shortened to the "Peugeot Driving School" in 2010. In 2012, the sponsorship came to an end and the attraction was renamed the "Alton Towers Driving School". In 2017, the ride was renamed "Cuckoo Cars Driving School" and the cars received updated, patterned shells.
