= Submission (Alton Towers) =

Removed double swinging inverter flat ride

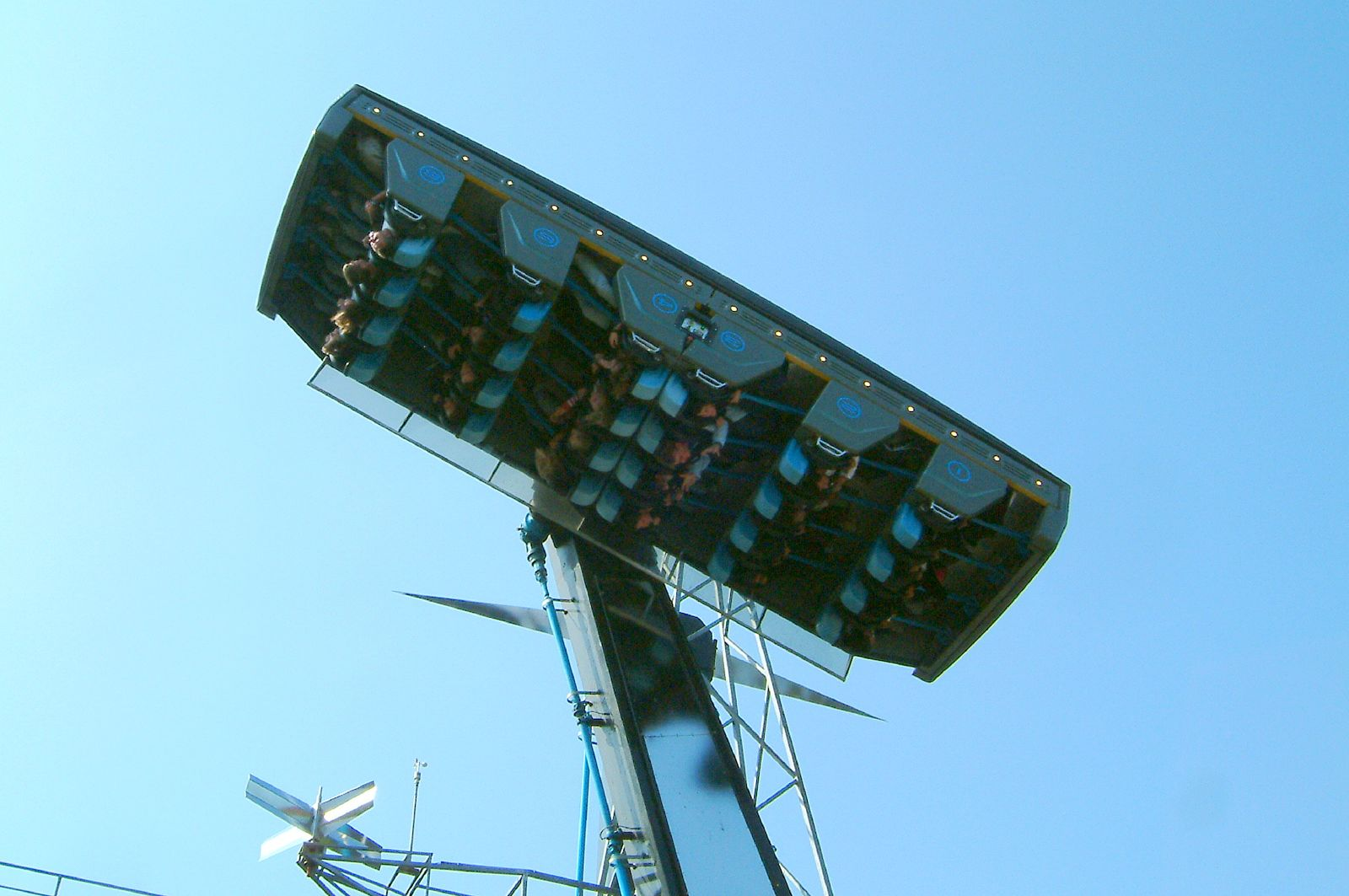

Alton Towers
- Area: X-Sector
- Coordinates: 52.99°N 1.9°W
- Status: Removed
- Opening date: 2001
- Closing date: 2013
- Replaced by: Mixtape

Ride statistics
- Attraction type: Double Swinging Inverters
- Manufacturer: Chance Rides
- Height restriction: 120 cm (3 ft 11 in)

Submission was a theme park ride at Alton Towers in Staffordshire, England from 2001 until 2013. It was a Chance Rides double swinging inverter.

== History ==
Submission opened in 2001 in the X-Sector area of Alton Towers. The slogan used in the advertisement was 'Hang in there'. For a few years until its closure, the ride only operated one of its arms due to diminishing popularity and maintenance issues. It was announced that the ride would not be returning in February 2014 as part of the park's long-term development plan ahead of the beginning of the season.

== Description ==
Submission was painted blue and was covered in a shiny metal. Each of its two arms had a counterweight in the shape of two metal spikes.

== Ride experience ==
Submission was a simple ride, featuring a central tower with two gondolas attached to rotating arms on each side. Each gondola contained 6 rows of 4. When the ride started, the gondola was lifted 90 degrees back and forth, slightly tilting forwards and backwards and gradually rotated in a full circle with the gondola spinning the opposite way to the arm, making the riders go upside down.

As the arm would move in one direction, the gondola would tilt in the other way. Because of the double sided seating which saw riders sitting back-to-back, when one arm moved one way, there would be one set of riders tilted vertically, pointing to the ground, not dissimilar from Oblivion. When the gondola reached its highest point, it was turned upside-down.
