= Doom & Sons =

Removed walk-through haunted house ride

Coordinates: 52.98897°N 1.884314°W

Alton Towers
- Area: Talbot Street
- Status: Removed
- Opening date: 1981
- Closing date: 1991

Ride statistics
- Attraction type: Walkthrough, dark ride, haunted attraction
- Theme: Gothic

Doom & Sons was a former attraction in the Talbot Street area of Alton Towers theme park, Staffordshire, England. The attraction was opened in 1981 and was Alton Towers' first haunted attraction. It was a walk-through with illusions, interactive features and sensory effects. The attraction closed in 1991.
