= Around the World in 80 Days (Alton Towers) =

Closed dark boat ride

Alton Towers
- Status: Closed
- Opening date: 1981
- Closing date: 1993
- Replaced by: Toyland Tours

Ride statistics
- Attraction type: Dark boat ride
- Manufacturer: Mack Rides
- Designer: Keith Sparks Associates
- Capacity: 1,000 riders per hour
- Vehicle type: Boat
- Vehicles: 10 boats
- Riders per vehicle: 9
- Rows: 3
- Riders per row: 3
- Duration: 4 minutes

Around the World in 80 Days was an attraction in the Talbot Street (now David Walliams World) area of Alton Towers theme park, Staffordshire, England. The attraction opened in 1981, just one year after the park first opened. It was the first dark ride at Alton Towers, one of the largest in the UK at the time.

It was a 4-minute boat ride which followed the adventures of Phileas Fogg and was loosely based on Jules Verne's 1873 novel Around the World in Eighty Days and took riders through various different countries from around the world. Each boat could hold 9 people and there were 10 boats with 1,000 guests an hour.

The ride was produced by Sparks Associates and later revamped by Sally Corporation. Each country had its own music and some animated characters. You could travel through London, Siam, Egypt, New York City, Venice, Greenland, Las Vegas, Vienna, Holland, Brazil, Paris, London Docks and Battersea. The ride station was themed around the London docks and featured an animated Phileas Fogg (Based on the actor David Niven from the movie of the same name) in a hot air balloon. Guests would board from the right hand side and exit on their left.

In 1991, a model of the Haunted House and Runaway Mine Train were added to the final scene, to advertise their opening for 1992.

The ride was popular in its time, but was closed in 1993 and received a complete overhaul after the Tussauds Group took over Alton Towers. The ride was replaced by Toyland Tours in 1994, retaining the ride track and boats but with all new scenes. This in turn was replaced by Charlie and the Chocolate Factory: The Ride in 2006 and the Alton Towers Dungeon in 2019.
