= Dungeon (disambiguation) =

A dungeon is an underground prison or vault.

Dungeon, dungeons or donjon may also refer to:

== Games ==
- Dungeon (video game), a 1975 mainframe role-playing game
- Dungeon!, a board game published 1975 as part of the Dungeons & Dragons franchise
  - Dungeon! (video game), a 1982 video game adaptation of the board game
- The Dungeon (1993 video game), an Acorn Archimedes role-playing game
- Donjon (role-playing game), a 2002 role-playing game
- The Dungeon (Dimension Six), a 1980 role-playing game supplement; a set of pieces to construct dungeon scenes for miniature figures
- Dungeons (Alderac Entertainment Group), a 2001 role-playing game supplement by Alderac Entertainment Group where dungeons and catacombs are detailed
- Dungeons (video game), a 2011 strategy video game
- Dungeon, an alternative name for Zork, a computer game
- DungeonWorld (play-by-mail game), a fantasy role-playing play-by-mail game published in 1998, originally called Dungeon
- Minecraft Dungeons, a 2020 dungeon crawler video game
  - Minecraft Dungeons II, an upcoming sequel of the video game
- A trope commonly found in video games, usually climaxing in a relatively difficult final "boss" battle. Finishing a dungeon is usually rewarded with in-game items, currency or achievements.

== Literature ==
- Dungeon (comics), a series of comic books created by Joann Sfar and Lewis Trondheim, originally published under the French title Donjon
- Dungeon series, a series of fantasy novels written under the auspices of Philip José Farmer
- Dungeon (magazine), an official magazine of the Dungeons & Dragons franchise

== Places ==
- Fort Purcell, Tortola, British Virgin Islands - commonly referred to as "The Dungeon"

== Other uses ==
- The Dungeon (1922 film), an American silent film directed by Oscar Michaeux
- The Dungeon (Playhouse 90), an American television play
- "Dungeon", an episode of the TV series Adventure Time
- Dungeon (band), an Australian power metal musical group
- Dungeon (BDSM), a playspace for BDSM activities
- Hart Dungeon or The Dungeon, a wrestling school in Calgary, Alberta, Canada
- The Dungeons, a series of tourist attractions owned by Merlin Entertainment
  - London Dungeon
  - York Dungeon
  - Edinburgh Dungeon
  - Berlin Dungeon
  - Hamburg Dungeon
  - Amsterdam Dungeon

== See also ==
- Dungeon Master (disambiguation)
- Dungeons & Dragons (disambiguation)
