= Edinburgh Dungeon =

Tourist attraction in Edinburgh, Scotland

The Edinburgh Dungeon

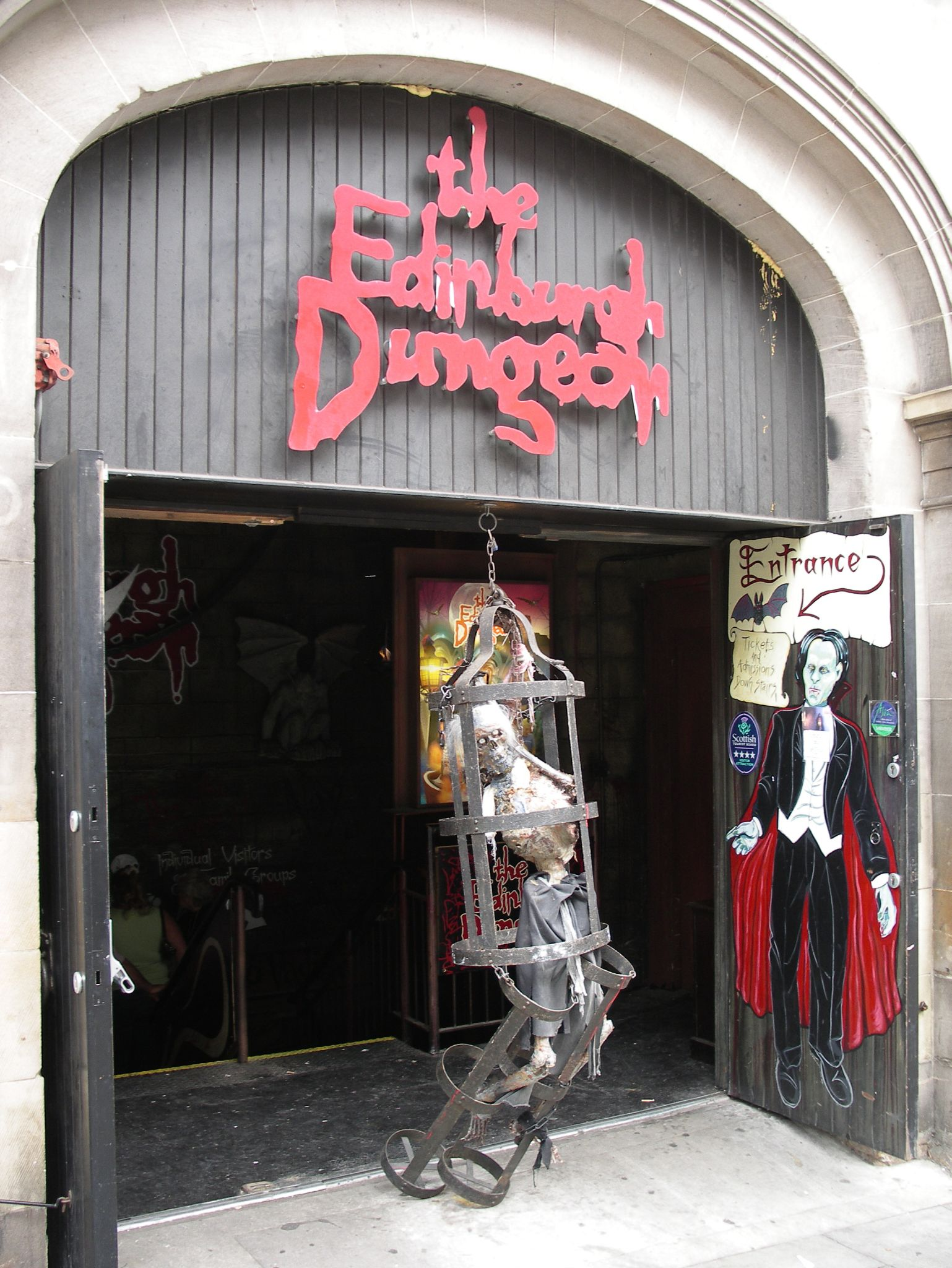
- Main entrance on Market Street

- Location within Edinburgh city centre
- Established: 2000; 26 years ago
- Location: 31 Market St, Edinburgh EH1 1DF, Scotland, United Kingdom
- Coordinates: 55.9511°N 3.1909°W
- Type: Haunted attraction
- General Manager: Lee Phillips
- Public transit access: Edinburgh Waverley
- Website: www.thedungeons.com/edinburgh/

Listed Building – Category B
- Official name: 31, 32-35 and 36-39 (Inclusive Numbers), Market Street, Edinburgh
- Designated: 22 June 2015
- Reference no.: LB52353

The Edinburgh Dungeon is an underground tourist attraction/haunted attraction in Edinburgh's city centre, on Market Street. It uses live actor shows and interactive rides to show various historical events from Scottish history in a scary fun style, with audience interaction and special effects, theatrical sets and performance, similar to other Dungeons in London and York.

The Edinburgh Dungeon is part of a chain of attractions by Merlin Entertainments.

== History ==
The Edinburgh Dungeon was founded in 2000 by Vardon Attractions (now Merlin Entertainments) founder and later CEO, Nick Varney. Based on the same concept as the London Dungeon, early characters included Vikings, William Wallace, Burke and Hare, and scenes from Edinburgh's famously plague-ridden 'closes' (alleyways).

Since its opening, it has evolved to feature walkthrough theatrical shows, such as Witch Hunt (based on the witch trials of the mid-17th century), and the cannibal cave of Sawney Bean, based on the legend of the notorious cannibal family who resided in a cave in Galloway for decades.

== Format ==
The Edinburgh Dungeon features 11 shows, 15 actors and 1 ride. Visitors are taken on a journey through 500 years of Edinburgh's history where they meet actors performing as some of Edinburgh's most infamous characters, including Agnes Finnie, Burke & Hare, Sawney Bean and The Green Lady Elizabeth Elphinstone. The Dungeon's shows are staged on theatrical sets with special effects, including shaking floors, spinning walls, levitation gags and air jets. The show incorporates events such as The Plague, the witch trials, and includes characters such as 'The Torturer', 'The Foul Clenger' (Plague Cleaner), and 'The Judge'. Guests are encouraged to participate in all shows. The experience also includes a Drop Ride to Doom, which is a free-fall ride, staged as a public hanging.

In November 2016, the Edinburgh Dungeon underwent major construction in order to expand the offering and install new show areas. In a project worth over £500,000 they installed a steel structure that now houses their Witch Hunt show, which features Agnes Finnie and the Witch 'Pricker', charged with extracting her confession. The show also features many special effects, which, at the time of installation, was a world first combination.

== Related attractions ==
The Edinburgh Dungeon is part of the Merlin Entertainments Group, and is one of eight Dungeons in Europe. The Amsterdam Dungeon, Berlin Dungeon, the Blackpool Tower Dungeon, The Castle Dungeon at Warwick Castle, Hamburg Dungeon, and the York Dungeon are also part of the Dungeon Group.
