= Corkscrew (Alton Towers) =

Former roller coaster at Alton Towers

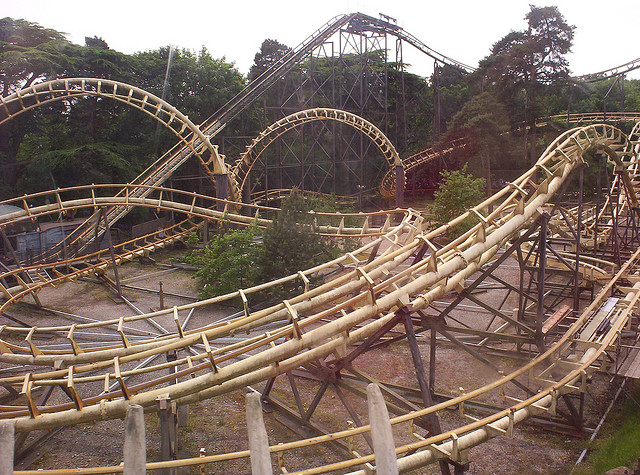

Alton Towers
- Location: Alton Towers
- Park section: Ug Land
- Coordinates: 52°59′05″N 1°53′25″W
- Status: Removed
- Opening date: 4 April 1980
- Closing date: 9 November 2008
- Cost: £1,250,000
- Replaced by: TH13TEEN

General statistics
- Type: Steel
- Manufacturer: Vekoma
- Designer: Werner Stengel
- Model: Corkscrew with Bayerncurve
- Track layout: custom
- Lift/launch system: Chain lift hill
- Height: 23 m (75 ft)
- Drop: 21 m (68.9 ft)
- Length: 731 m (2,398 ft)
- Speed: 64.3 km/h (40.0 mph)
- Inversions: 2
- Duration: 1:15
- Capacity: 1,400 riders per hour
- Height restriction: 47.3 in (120 cm)
- Trains: 2 trains with 6 cars; riders arranged 2 across in 2 rows for a total of 24 riders per train
- Total mass: 350 metric tons (340 long tons; 390 short tons)
- Built base area: 95 m × 50 m (312 ft × 164 ft)
- Corkscrew at RCDB

Corkscrew was a steel roller coaster located at Alton Towers theme park, in the United Kingdom. It was manufactured by Dutch company Vekoma, engineered by Werner Stengel of German Ing.-Büro Stengel GmbH (Ingenieur Büro Stengel). The coaster was located in the Ug Land area, formerly called Talbot Centre. It was the theme park's earliest ride and considered one of the greatest factors in promoting the new theme park to the British public. It was the first double-inverting coaster in the UK, and was well received publicly in the 1980s.

== History ==
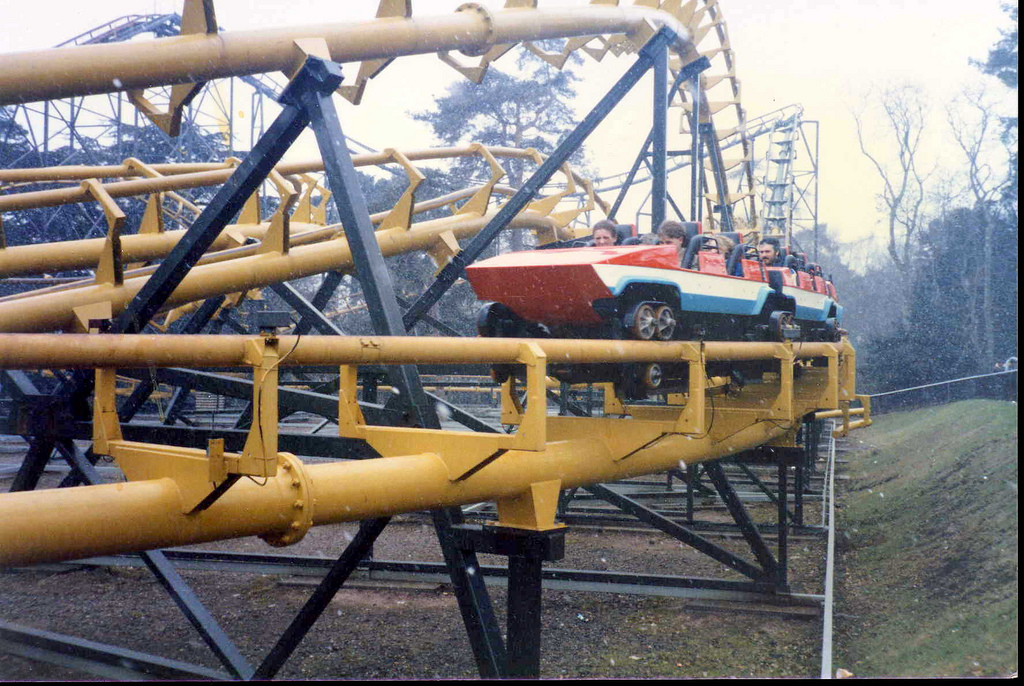
Corkscrew with its original trains

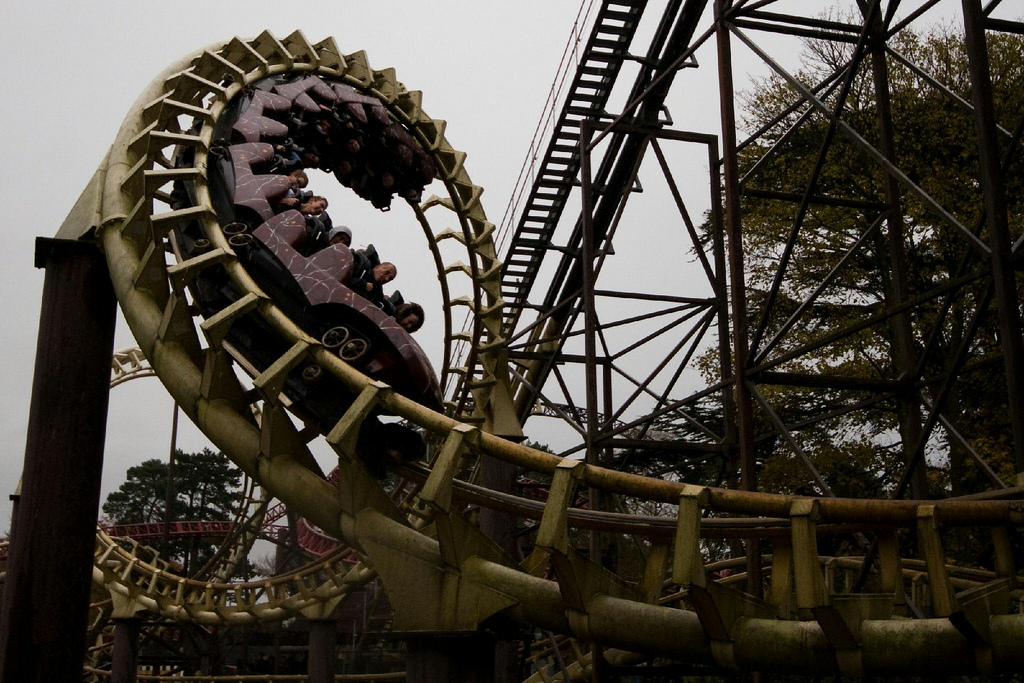
Corkscrew with its later trains

By 1979, Alton Towers had made plans to develop its grounds into a new style of leisure park, under the leadership of its Chairman John Broome. As part of this scheme, Corkscrew opened on 4 April 1980; 46 years ago, to a crowd of 30,000. It became the main attraction of the park, and led to attendance numbers doubling from 500,000 in 1979, to over 1,000,000 in 1980.

It was a Vekoma MK1200 Corkscrew with Bayerncurve. Weighing a total of 350 metric tons (340 long tons; 390 short tons), and built within a base area of 95 by 50 metres (312 by 164 feet), the modular steel track was painted yellow, whilst the steel supports were painted black. It originally used two trains of six cars (24 riders per train, four in each car) in red, white and blue colours.

In 1984, more attractions were added surrounding it in the new 'Festival Park' along with Enterprise and the Twirling Toadstool (then Wave Swinger).

In 1996, the ride received new trains from Vekoma to a new design. When Festival Park was revamped as Ug Land in 1999, Corkscrew was integrated as part of the wider area theme with a prehistoric overlay, including a dinosaur skeleton that the queue line passed through. The trains also received a new look and the track became a bone-coloured yellow.

In October 2008, after 28 years of service, Alton Towers confirmed that the ride was to be removed at the end of the 2008 season, to make room for TH13TEEN in 2010. On 9 November 2008, after carrying an estimated 43.5 passengers, Alton Towers held a special event in honour of the attraction in which the Corkscrew completed the final circuit of its 750 metres (2,460 feet) track. The official date for the last day in regular service was 2 November 2008 - the last day of the season.

After being dismantled, the section of track that formed the two corkscrew inversions was preserved; it is now displayed as a feature at the park's main entrance.

== Ride experience ==
The ride started by a slow ascent of 22 metres (72 feet), powered by a 75 kilowatts (101 horsepower) lift motor. Once it had reached the top, the car went round a turn and down the 20.7 metres (68 feet) drop reaching a maximum 44 miles per hour (71 kilometres per hour). The train then pulled through a camel hump and a 180-degree turn, before entering the two Corkscrew inversions. Once the train exited the two inversions, it then went around a 180-degree turn and into some trim brakes. After that, the train went across another camel hump, and into the Bayernkurve (a helix-type manouvre), and around the perimeter of the coaster again, before going into the brakes and station.

The Corkscrew became a very rough ride toward the end of its life, which contributed to the decision to dismantle it in 2008. The over-the-shoulder restraints were bulky and the motion of the coaster caused riders' heads to bang against them. Local newspaper The Sentinel added that "you usually left feeling as though your neck would never be the same again."

== Popular culture ==
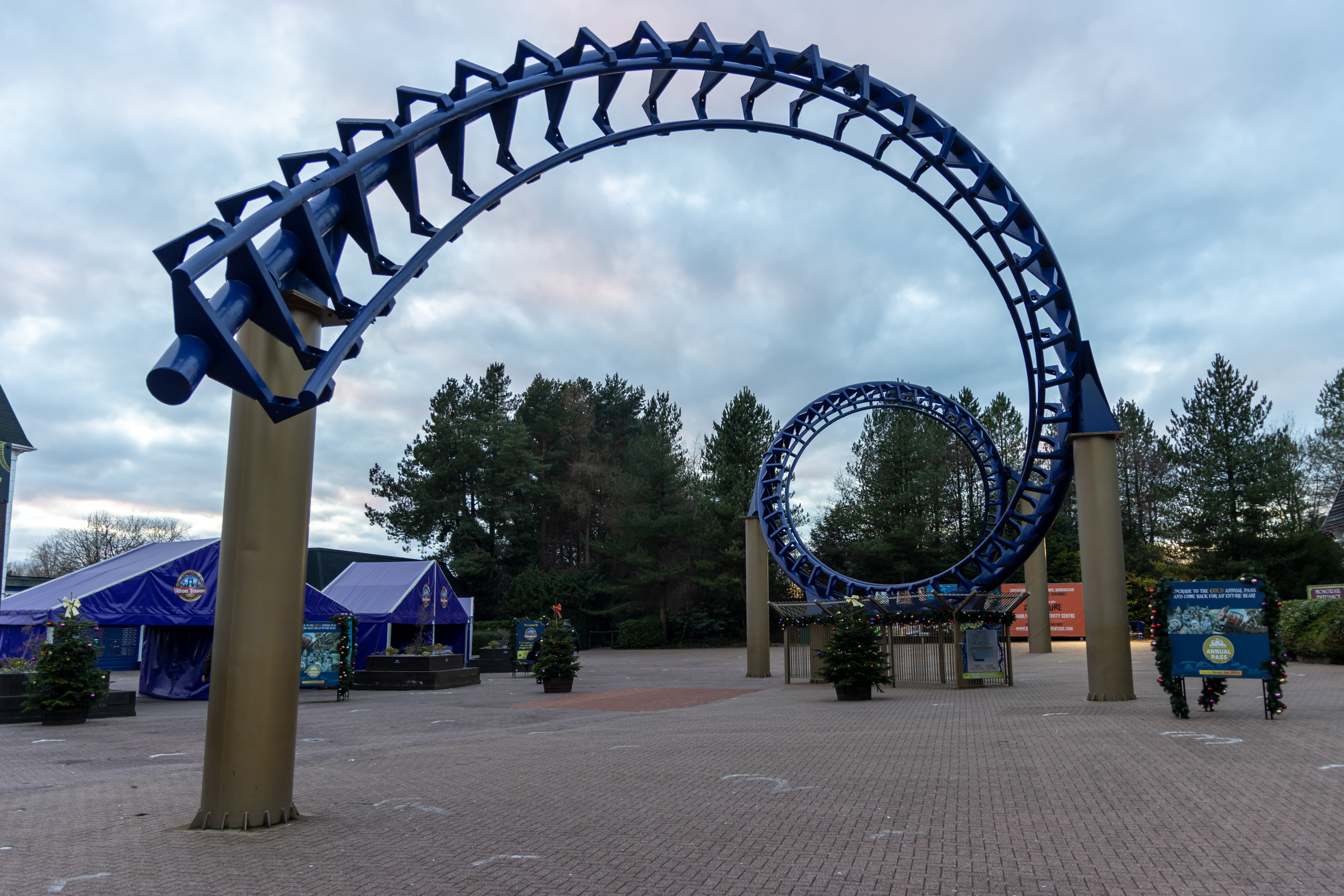
The Corkscrew track on display at the park entrance in 2023.

Footage of the Corkscrew and the Pirate Ship feature in the music video for British doo-wop band Darts cover of "Let's Hang On!".

The opening title sequence used by The ITV Chart Show between 7 January 1989 and 30 November 1991 was created by digitally rotoscoping footage of the Corkscrew. A photograph of the Corkscrew was used on the cover of the 1991 single "Everybody in the Place" by The Prodigy.

One of the Corkscrew's train cars was put up for sale on eBay. The car was sold on 15 December 2008 for £7,200; the proceeds went to Merlin's Magic Wand children's charity. Alton Towers retained the famous corkscrew inversions, which were refurbished, and placed as an artwork feature in the entrance plaza. Much of the remaining track has been scrapped.
