= San Francisco Dungeon =

The San Francisco Dungeon
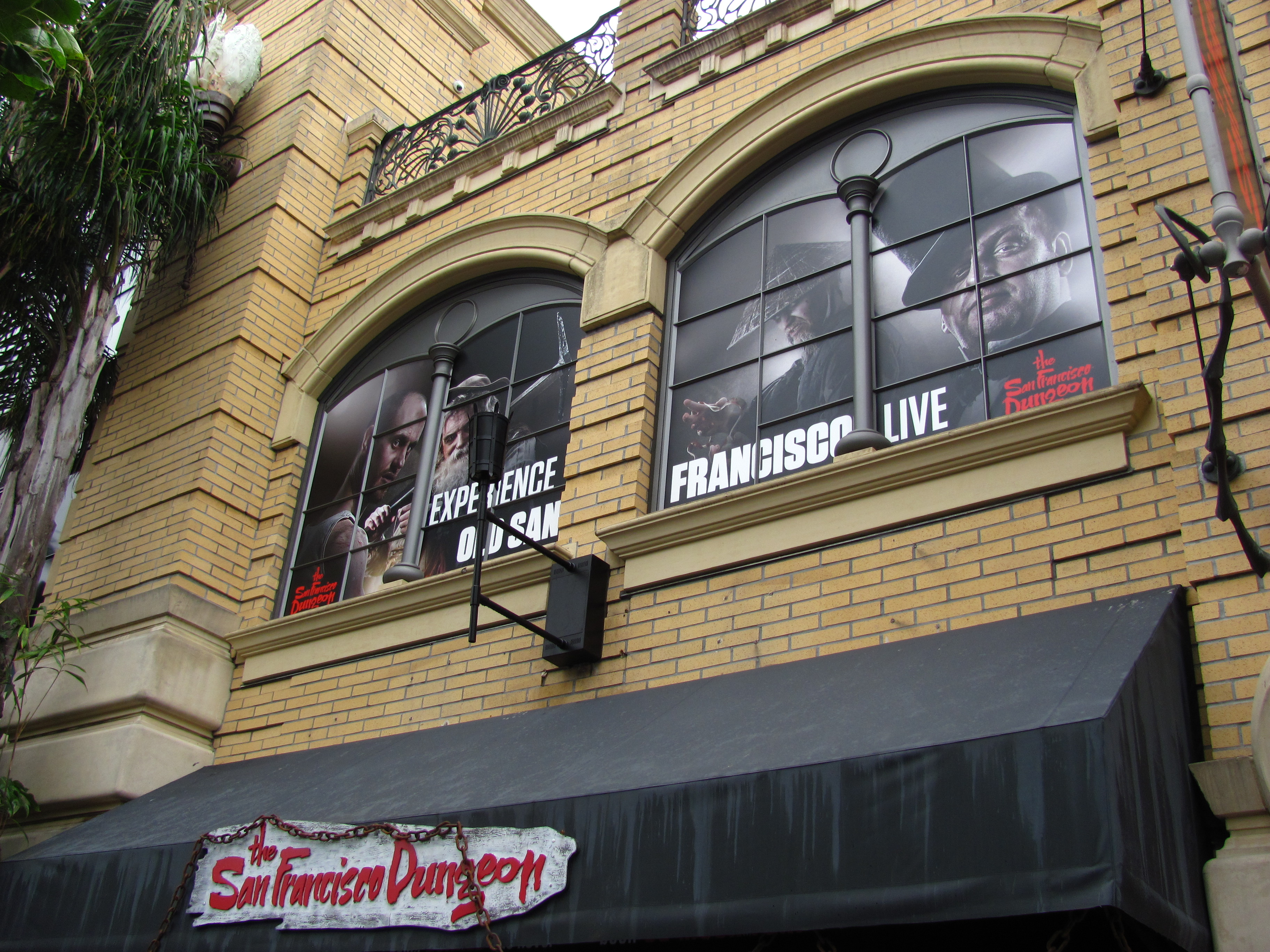
- The dungeon in 2014
- Established: June 2014
- Dissolved: June 2021
- Location: San Francisco
- Coordinates: 37.80823°N 122.41479°W
- Website: https://www.thedungeons.com/sanfrancisco/

The San Francisco Dungeon was a tourist attraction that recreated historical events using 360° sets, special effects, and live actors. Visitors walked through the Dungeon, and were guided through each show by professional actors. The attraction also contained a dark boat ride.

The San Francisco Dungeon was opened in June 2014, following the success of its European counterparts which include the London Dungeon and the Amsterdam Dungeon. The Dungeons are owned and operated by Merlin Entertainments.

The San Francisco Dungeon closed during the COVID-19 pandemic lockdown and did not reopen.

== Shows and rides ==
Shows and rides include:

- The Descent - visitors descend into the Dungeon in an old mine shaft elevator and meet businessman Colonel Jack Gamble
- Gold Rush Greed - a re-enactment of the clash between the natives and the new settlers on the American frontier in 1848
- Lost Mines of Sutter's Mill - visitors search the maze of mines for any remaining gold
- Streets of San Francisco - visitors meet gang The Hounds and their leader Sam Roberts down Kearny Street
- The Court of San Francisco - a re-enactment of an old San Francisco courtroom where visitors are interrogated by former mayor and judge "Mad Meade"
- Miss Piggott's Saloon - recreation of an old drinking saloon featuring Miss Piggott and Shanghai Kelly
- Shanghai Kelly's Boat Ride - boat ride through the back waterways to learn about the lives of those who were sold to work as sailors
- Chinatown Plague - recreation of the streets of San Francisco during the bubonic plague epidemic in 1900
- The Ghosts of Alcatraz - recreation of the Alcatraz military prison during the 1800s, ending with a drop tower.

During the San Francisco Dungeon’s operation a number of temporary overlays would be installed. These included an overlay of the Chinatown Plague room called Chinatown Gang Wars as well as an overnight experience. In 2019, they would offer the "Queer Dungeon" experience which included alcoholic beverages and "totally queer" elements such as an actors in drag and references to SF queer life. This was restricted to audiences 21 years of age and older.
