= SW6 =

SW6 may refer to:

- SW postcode area
- Fulham
- West London derby
- Legion of Super-Heroes
- Star Wars Episode VI: Return of the Jedi
- The codename for Th13teen at Alton Towers, England.
- SW6 tram, a class of electric trams built by the Melbourne & Metropolitan Tramways Board.
- Layar LRT station, Singapore
