= Torture Museum, Amsterdam =

Museum in Amsterdam, Netherlands

Coordinates: 52.36729°N 4.8906°E

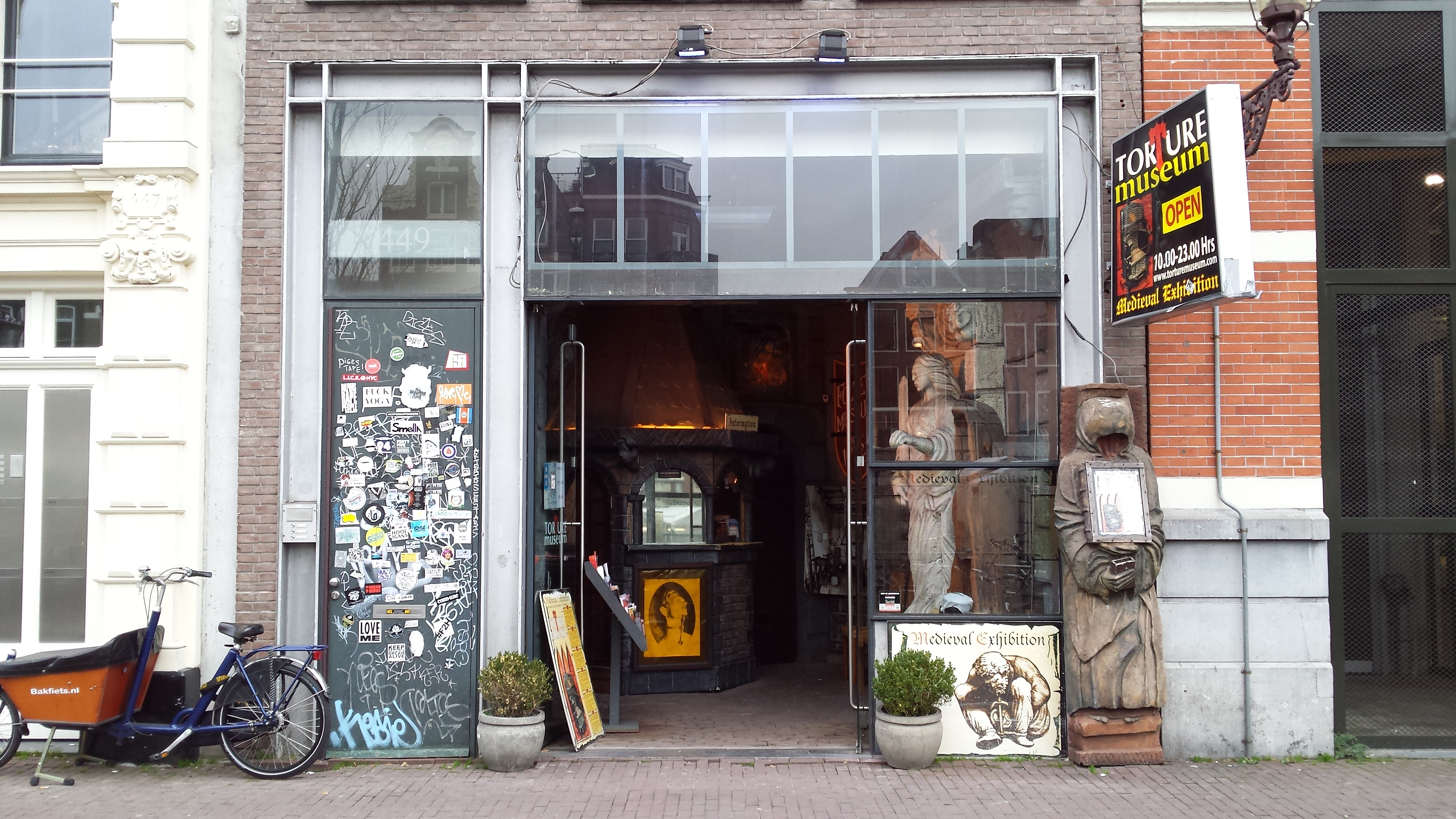
Main entrance of Torture Museum, Amsterdam

The Torture Museum, Amsterdam is located in Amsterdam, near the Bloemenmarkt overlooking the Singel. It exhibits historical instruments of torture. Like many other "Torture Museums", it exhibits fake items, devices which were seldom or never used in real history, particularly in the "Middle Age", such as Scold's bridle, iron maidens (a literary invention of the 19th century) or "breast rippers" which may have been used only in the ancient Roman empire.

The Daily Telegraph noted the museum as "one of the world's most unusual museums." The museum is popular among tourists.

The Torture Museum Amsterdam is not connected with another museum showcasing instruments of torture in Amsterdam: "the Museum of Medieval Torture Instruments".

== Museum layout ==
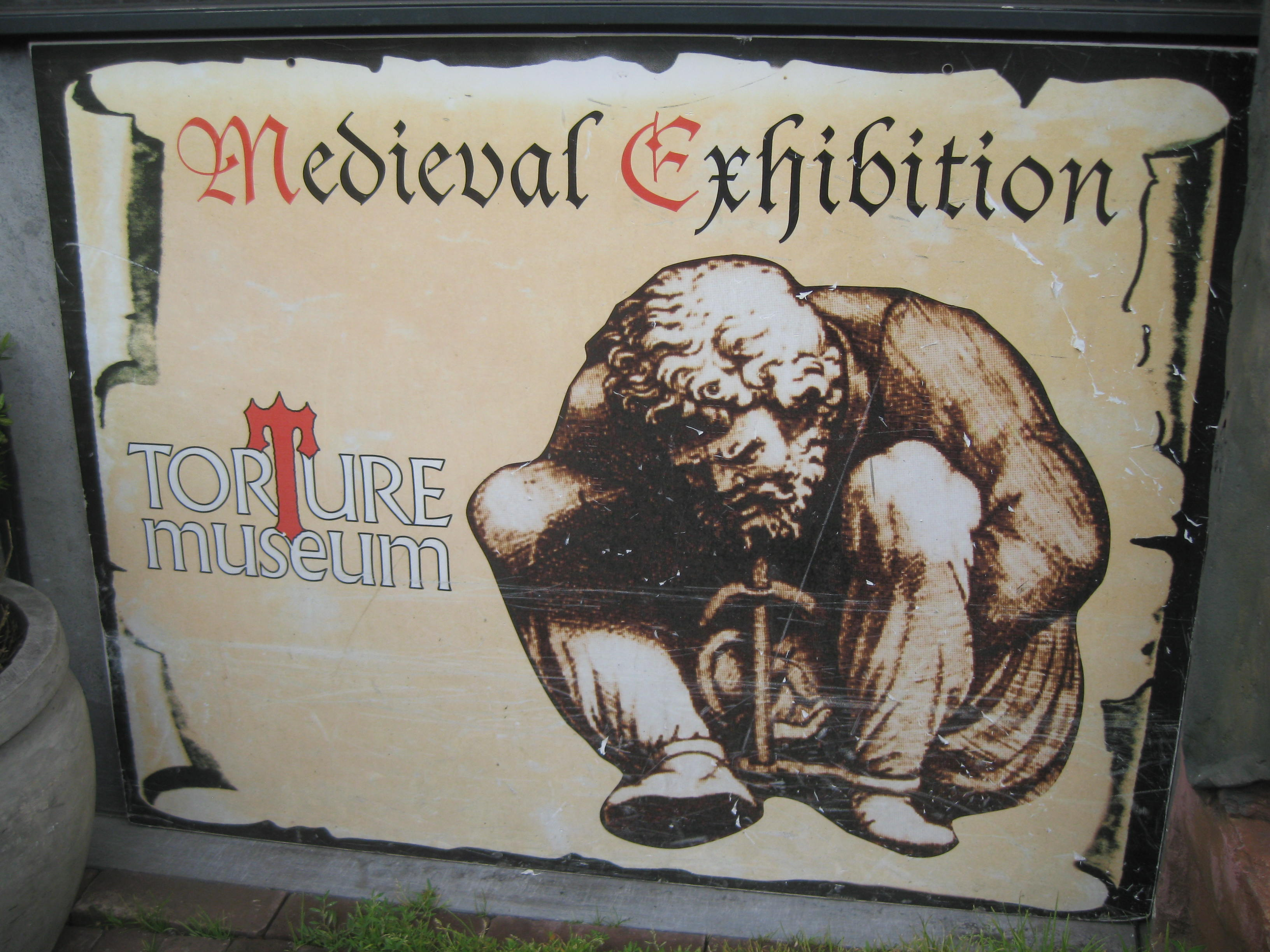
External sign for the Torture Museum, Amsterdam

The museum consists of narrow and dimly lit rooms. Each room features one or two torture devices. Each device is accompanied with an enlarged image from a book or article featuring that device in use and a description of that device and how and why it was used. The articles are translated into English, Dutch, French, German, Italian, and Spanish.

== Articles on display ==
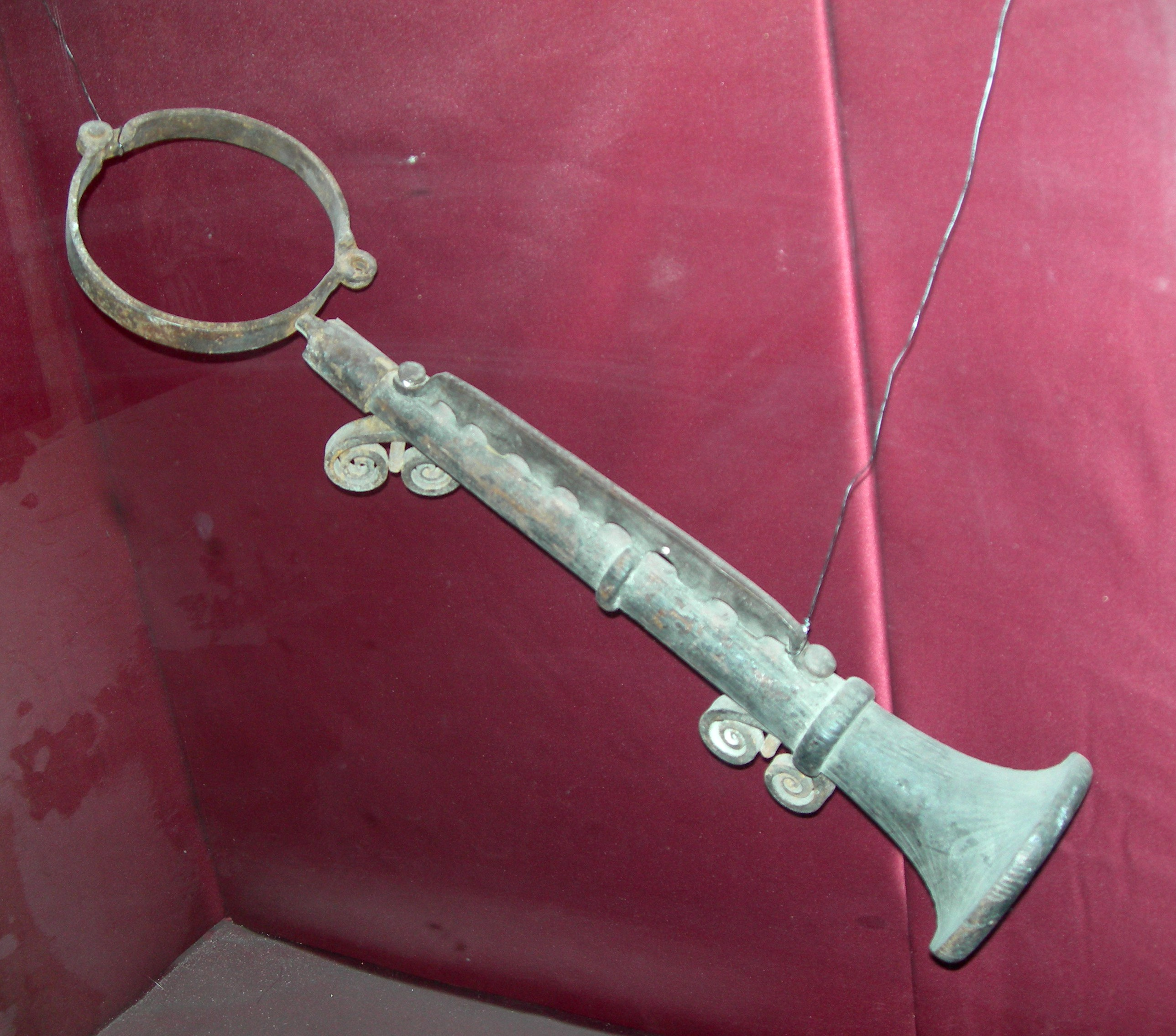
Flute of Shame displayed at the Torture Museum in Amsterdam.

The museum displays a guillotine, the rack and stocks, in addition to little-known items such as thumb screws and the flute of shame. Other objects housed in the museum include the iron maiden, skull crusher, Judas cradle, Catherine wheels, and Scold's bridle. Some of the devices are genuine and antique, but many are modern reconstructions.

== Significance ==
The museum, whilst small, regularly appears in lists of 'top weird museums' and is regularly visited and cited in regard to the museum's range of torture devices. Books have used the Torture Museum as a source.
