= Hamburg Dungeon =

Tourist attraction in Hamburg, Germany

Coordinates: 53°32′38″N 9°59′20″E

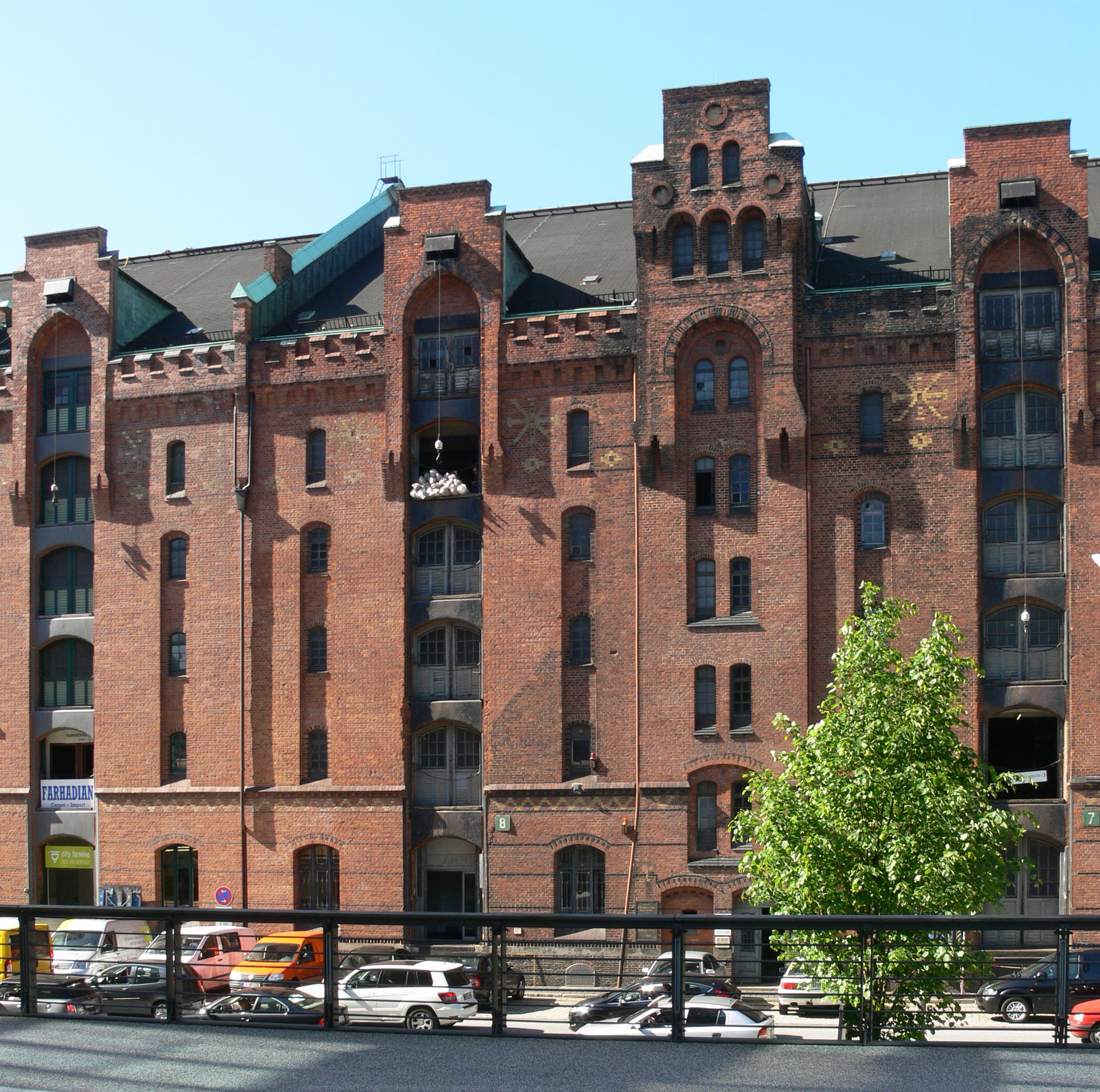
Hamburg Dungeon in Speicherstadt, Hamburg

Hamburg Dungeon, Hamburg

Built in 2000, the Hamburg Dungeon is a tourist attraction from a chain including the London Dungeon and Berlin Dungeon. It is the first of this brand to be built in mainland Europe. It provides a journey through Hamburg’s dark history in an actor led, interactive experience.

== Attractions ==
The Torture Chamber show is based on the interrogation of those thought to be smuggling to defy the 18th-century Napoleonic invasion. Visitors have to find their way through the terrible Great Fire of Hamburg that devastated much of Hamburg in 1842. There is a recreation of a Plague-ravaged Hamburg street, where the effect the killer disease had in the city in 1664 is animated. The Labyrinth of the Lost is a mirror maze. The visitor stands in an Inquisition court where they are accused of sins against God. The punishments are always harsh and the court is unforgiving as some of the darkest moments of the country’s history are played out. The story of the life of the infamous pirate Klaus Störtebeker, who used to plunder the Baltic and North Seas, is told via a brief video. Visitors are then taken on to a mock pirate ship to help fight in a nautical battle before witnessing the execution of the famous pirate. Hamburg used to be prone to terrible flooding (Sturmflut 1717), with one of the worst being on Christmas Day 1717. Visitors are taken on a boat ride which is designed to look like a small raft to take them through the carnage of the city and to safety. The graphic exhibition and show Cholera 1892 depicts the cholera epidemic which killed more than 1% of the population of Hamburg.

== Parent company ==
The Hamburg Dungeon also has sister sites at the Berlin Dungeon, London Dungeon, York Dungeon, Edinburgh Dungeon and Amsterdam Dungeon. Each Dungeon is based on the same theme but investigates the history of its area. The sites are owned by Poole based Merlin Entertainments.

== See also ==
- Torture Museums
