= London Dungeon =

Tourist attraction in London

The London Dungeon

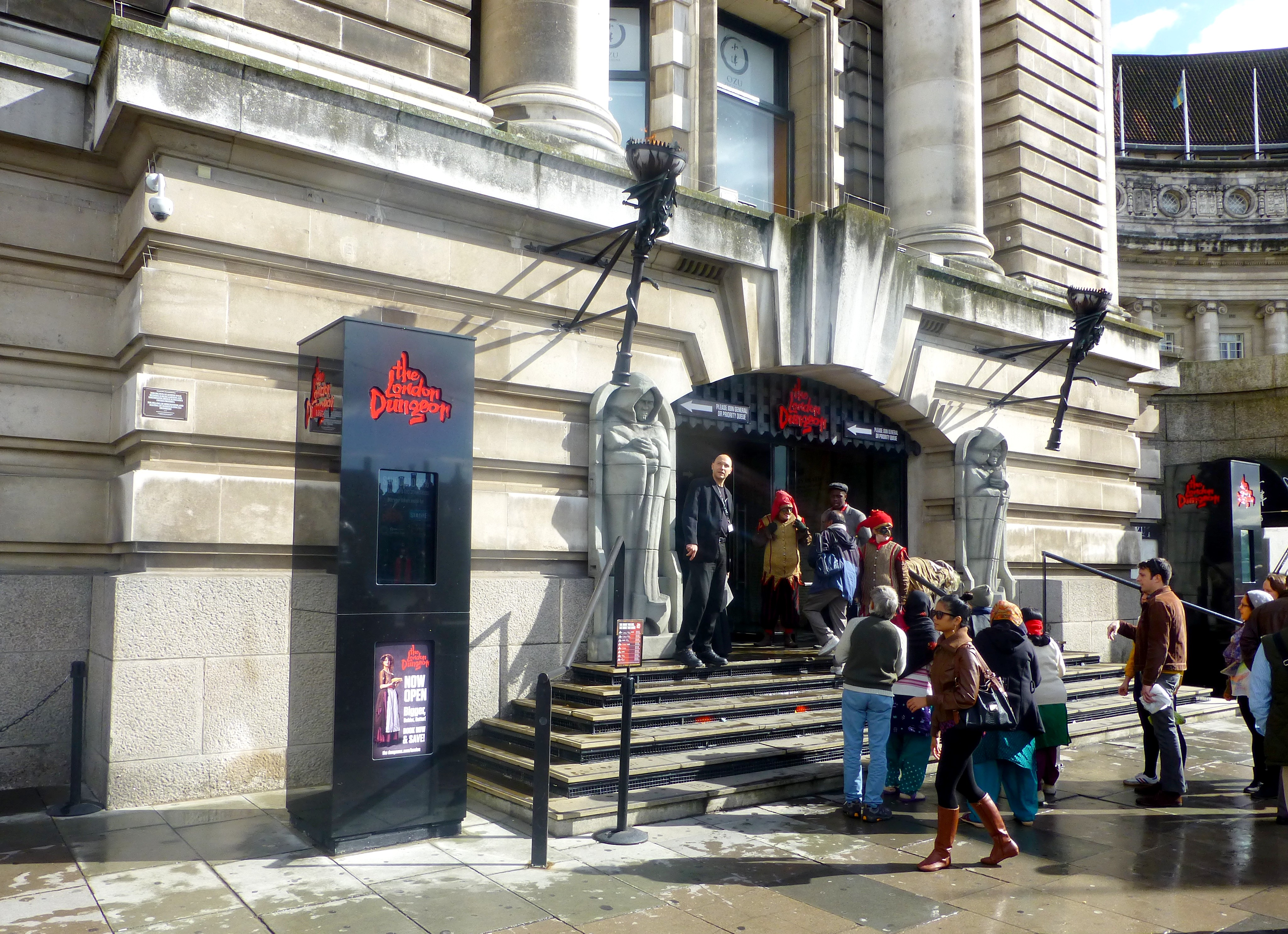

- Location within Central London
- Established: 15 September 1974; 52 years ago (in Tooley Street); 1 March 2013; 13 years ago (in County Hall)
- Location: County Hall, Westminster Bridge Road, South Bank, London, SE1; United Kingdom
- Coordinates: 51.502685°N 0.119433°W
- Public transit access: Waterloo; Waterloo; Waterloo East
- Website: thedungeons.com/london

The London Dungeon is a tourist attraction/haunted attraction along London's South Bank, England, which recreates various gory and macabre historical events in a gallows humour style. It uses a mixture of live actors, special effects and rides.

== History ==
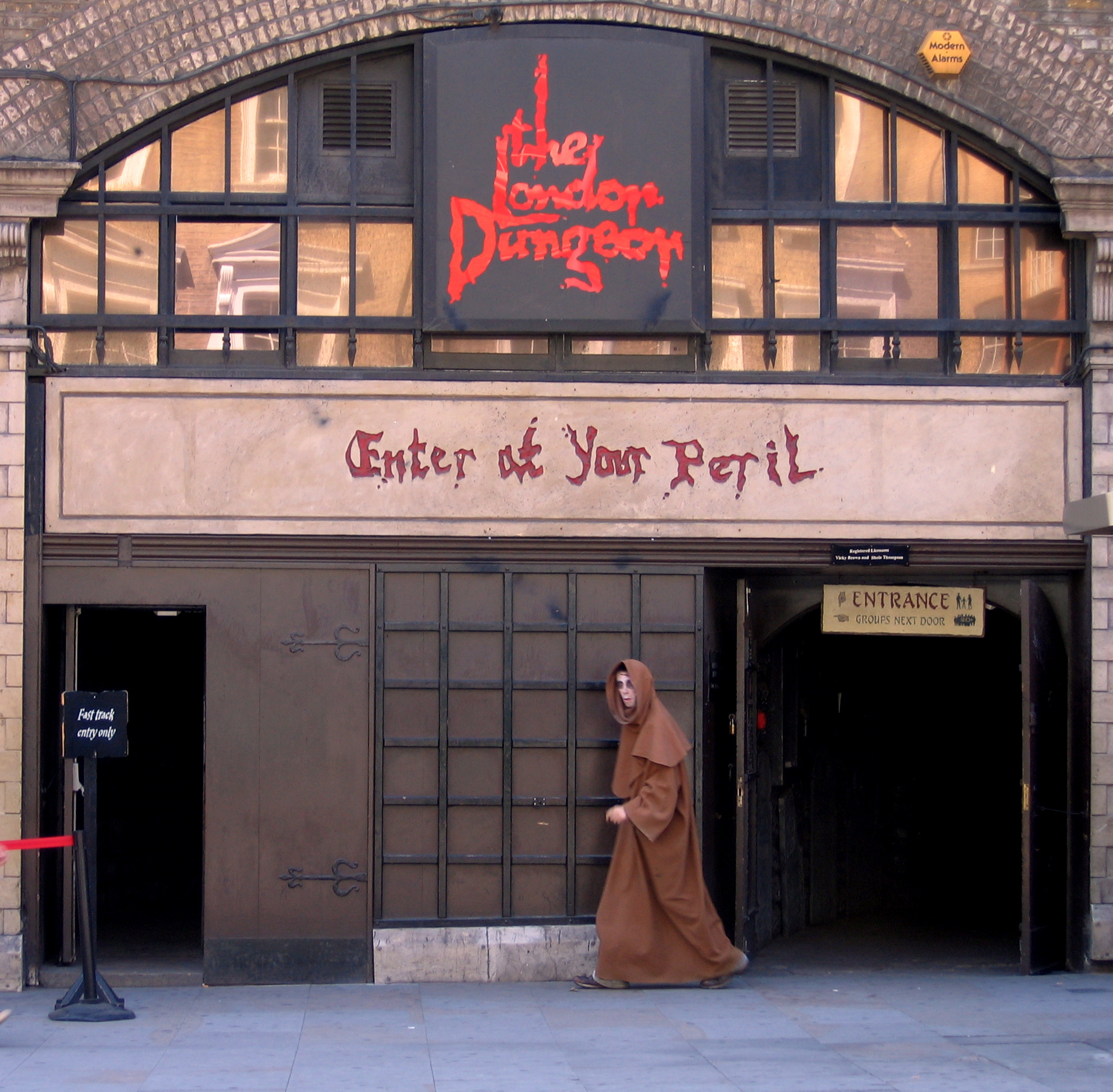
The former entrance to the original London Dungeon.

The London Dungeon was opened in 1974 by Annabel Geddes. The attraction was originally a wax exhibition of dark history, consisting of themed tableaux under the London Bridge station arches. Early characters included Boudica, Mary Tudor and Thomas Becket, and had scenes from the Norman Conquest.

From the late 1980s to mid-1990s, it evolved to feature walkthrough historical shows, such as the Great Fire of London and Jack the Ripper, during which time it was owned by the Kunick Leisure Group.

It was acquired by Vardon Attractions in 1992, which later became Merlin Entertainments through a management buyout, led by Nick Varney. Merlin rebranded the Dungeon more as an interactive horror attraction, less historically-accurate and based around bad taste humour.

In 2013, the London Dungeon moved from its premises of 39 years in Tooley Street, to County Hall, South Bank, to be grouped with other Merlin-owned attractions such as the London Eye. The new building was designed by architect Ralph Knott and was influenced by Baroque-style art. It is located directly opposite the Houses of Parliament, the same buildings that Guy Fawkes tried to blow up with gunpowder in 1605. The move brought the opportunity to reinvigorate the Dungeon; the rebuild took an entire year and a budget of £20 million.

== Format ==
The London Dungeon features 19 shows, 20 actors and two rides. Visitors are taken on a journey through 1000 years of London's history, where they meet actors performing as some of London's most infamous characters, including Jack the Ripper and Sweeney Todd. The Dungeon's shows are staged on theatrical sets with special effects. The show incorporates events such as the Great Plague and the Gunpowder Plot, and includes characters such as "The Torturer", "The Plague Doctor", and "The Judge". Guests are encouraged to participate in the shows. The experience also includes a "drop ride to doom", a free-fall ride staged as a public hanging.

== Tooley Street tour ==
The original London Dungeon opened in 1974 as an exhibition through dark British history, operating as a free-flow walkthrough attraction. It was expanded in the 1980s and 90s with several historical walkthrough attractions, such as the Great Fire of London and Jack The Ripper.

By 1997, now owned by Vardon Attractions, the majority of the attraction was redeveloped as a batched series of attractions rather than a free-flow exhibit. This saw the arrival of Judgment Day, a water dark ride that began with visitors entering a mock trial to be sentenced to death, then boarding a boat through Traitor's Gate to their execution. The boat ride itself was a masterpiece in design in a crowded space. Many of the original horror tableaux were refurbished as part of a new ransacked village scene, at the start of the ride, and the finale included a lift into the unknown, followed by a turntable and a backwards drop. The original story at the top of the drop was of an executioner with an axe, but this was later changed to a firing squad, that shot, just as guests plunged backwards.

2000 saw the re-introduction of the Fire of London segment, which simulated the burning streets of 17th-century London and featured a spinning trommel with smoke effects.

Under Merlin Entertainments, increasingly actor-led segments were added during the 2000s, such as the Labyrinth of the Lost mirror maze and the Great Plague. In 2004, the Judgement Day boat ride was altered and renamed to Traitor - Boat Ride to Hell, removing the original effects and scenes to become a simple boat ride, largely through darkness.

2006 saw the arrival of a Sweeney Todd segment. The attraction used surround sound and sensory effects to simulate an encounter with the titular character, before visitors' chairs were suddenly tilted backwards as a shock effect. Another ride segment was added in 2007, Extremis - Drop Ride to Doom, based on the hangings at Newgate gallows. Guests were raised 20 feet to meet an animatronic judge, priest and hangman before a free-fall drop into darkness. The new ride replaced the Blood and Guts Café.

In 2008, there were changes to the Jack the Ripper segment, which included a new ending scene in the Ten Bells pub. In 2009 came Surgery - Blood and Guts, which focused on gore and anatomy and used audience interaction. Bloody Mary: Killer Queen opened in 2010 in place of the Fire of London segment, and selected a random audience member to be publicly burned as a "heretic" using smoke effects.

Vengeance 5D opened in 2011, an interactive seated shooter ride, themed to a séance. The ride was constructed in areas of the original Jack the Ripper attraction, which was significantly shortened to accommodate the new ride. Vengeance lasted only one season.

The last Tooley Street tour took place on 31 January 2013, and contained the following sections: The Labyrinth of the Lost; The Great Plague; Surgery: Blood and Guts; The Torture Chamber; The Courtroom; Bedlam; Traitor: Boat Ride to Hell; Sweeney Todd; Vengeance 5D; Jack the Ripper; Bloody Mary: Killer Queen; Extremis: Drop Ride to Doom.

The new County Hall Dungeon features some of the attractions repurposed from the Tooley Street Dungeon, not including Bloody Mary and Vengeance 5D. When it departed its first home, many props were sold at a car boot sale in nearby Pimlico. The sale Items on offer included an "array of torture and surgical equipment, severed limbs, false eyeballs, plague doctor's potions & a severed head".

The original venue was redeveloped by Network Rail.

== Related attractions ==
The London Dungeon is one of six Dungeons in the UK. There are also a number of related attractions around the world.

=== United Kingdom ===
- The Blackpool Tower Dungeon
- The Castle Dungeon at Warwick Castle
- The Edinburgh Dungeon
- The York Dungeon
- The Alton Towers Dungeon (closed)

=== Mainland Europe ===
- Amsterdam Dungeon
- Berlin Dungeon
- Hamburg Dungeon

=== Asia ===
- Shanghai Dungeon (closed in 2024)

=== United States ===
- The San Francisco Dungeon (closed in June 2021)

== Critical response ==
In its changing years, the London Dungeon has been the subject of mixed response by visitors and leisure critics. In 1988, the attraction received much publicised appraisal from the then Lord Mayor of London Sir Greville Spratt for its dramatic depiction of the Great Fire of London. The original Great Fire attraction doubled attendance to the Dungeon upon opening.

By contrast, in 2009, American travel writer Rick Steves described the London Dungeon as "just a highly advertised, overpriced haunted house" and an "amateurish attraction" in his book on the city. The "Rough Guide to Britain" describes it as best enjoyed by "young teenagers and the credulous".
