= Berlin Dungeon =

The Berlin Dungeon
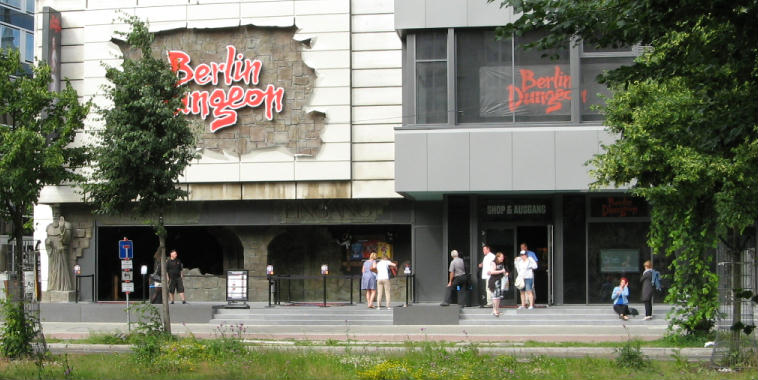
- Established: 2013
- Location: Spandauer Strasse 2, 101 78 Berlin, Germany
- Coordinates: 52.52141°N 13.40348°E
- Public transit access: S-Bahn: Hackescher Markt station
- Website: www.thedungeons.com/berlin/en/

Berlin Dungeon is a tourist attraction from a chain including the London Dungeon and Hamburg Dungeon. It provides a journey through Berlin's dark history in an actor led, interactive experience. There are both German and English shows and the actors speak German and English.

== Attractions ==
- Elevator of Doom
- Old Library of Berlin
- River Raft Ride
- Plagued Street
- Torture Chamber
- The Secret Court
- Lost Catacombs
- The White Lady
- The Butcher of Berlin

== Parent company ==
The Berlin Dungeon also has sister sites at the Hamburg Dungeon, London Dungeon, York Dungeon and Amsterdam Dungeon. Each Dungeon is based on the same theme but investigates the history of its area. The sites are owned by Poole based Merlin Entertainments.

== See also ==
- Merlin Entertainments
- Torture Museums
