= Dungeon Master (disambiguation) =

A Dungeon Master is the organizer of a Dungeons & Dragons role-playing game.

Dungeon Master may also refer to:

== Games ==
- Dungeon Master (video game), a 1987 video game series
- The Dungeon Master (video game), a 1983 video game for the ZX Spectrum
- Zork III: The Dungeon Master, a 1982 interactive fiction game

== Film and television ==
- Dungeon Master, a character in Dungeons & Dragons (TV series)
- The Dungeonmaster, a 1984 film
- The Dungeon Masters, a 2008 documentary film
- Dungeon Masters (actual play), a 2026 official Dungeons & Dragons web series

== Other uses ==
- The Dungeon Master: The Disappearance of James Dallas Egbert III, a 1985 non-fiction book by William Dear

== See also ==
- Dungeon (disambiguation)
