= Thirteen (roller coaster) =

Roller coaster at Alton Towers

TH13TEEN
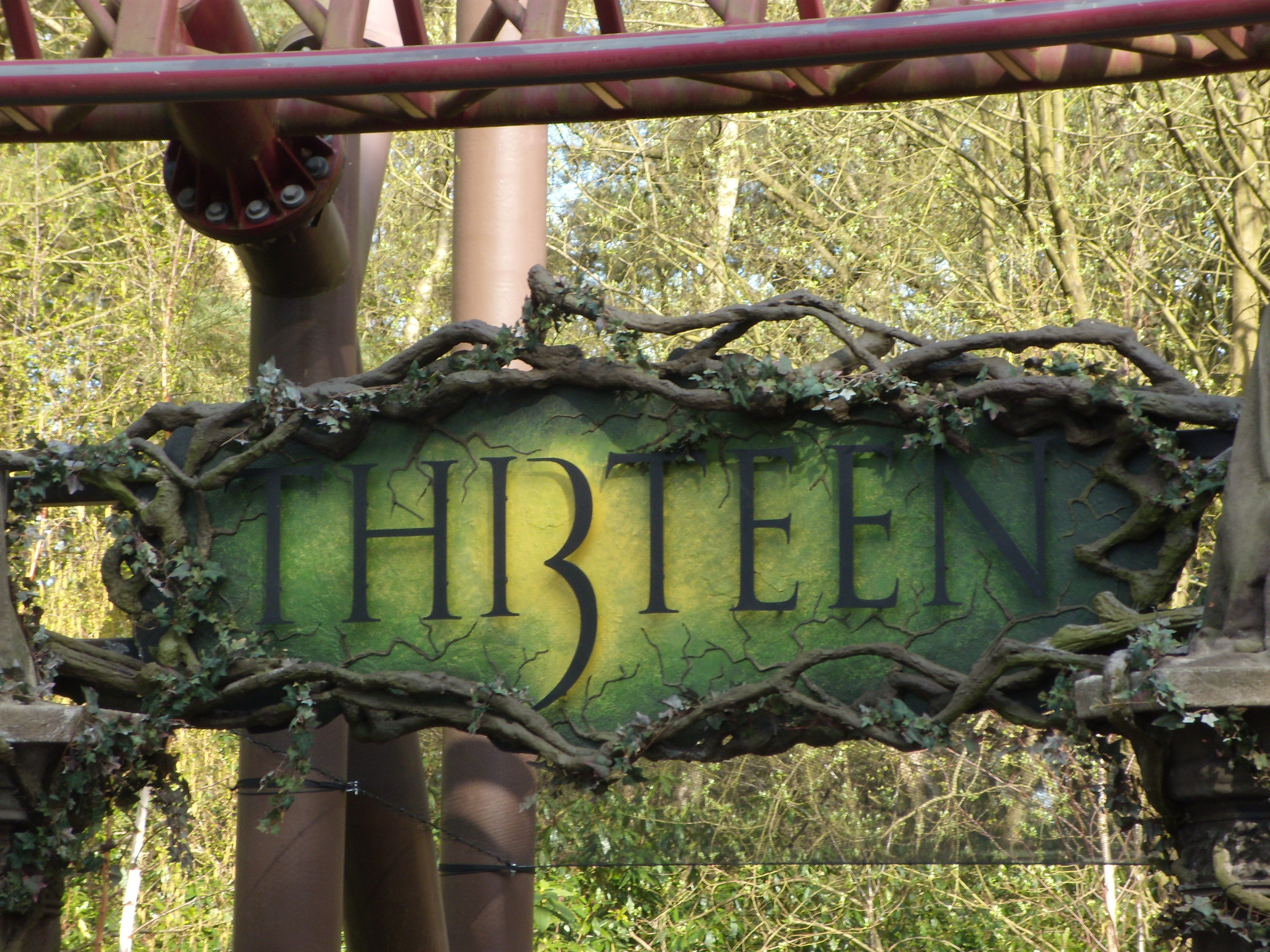
- Entrance to Thirteen

Alton Towers
- Location: Alton Towers
- Park section: Dark Forest
- Coordinates: 52.984701°N 1.890421°W
- Status: Operating
- Opening date: 20 March 2010
- Cost: £15 million
- Replaced: Corkscrew

General statistics
- Type: Steel
- Manufacturer: Intamin
- Model: Multi Dimension Coaster
- Lift/launch system: Drive tire lift hill
- Height: 65.6 ft (20.0 m)
- Drop: 60 ft (18 m)
- Length: 2,480 ft (760 m)
- Speed: 42 mph (68 km/h)
- Inversions: 0
- Duration: 1:40
- Capacity: 1,100 riders per hour
- G-force: 3.2
- Restraint style: Lap bar
- Height restriction: 47.3–77.2 in (120–196 cm)
- Trains: 3 trains with 5 cars; riders arranged 2 across in 2 rows for a total of 20 riders per train
- Slogan: "If you go down to the woods today, you better not go alone."
- Fastrack available
- Single rider line available
- TH13TEEN at RCDB

Thirteen (officially stylised as TH13TEEN) is a steel roller coaster at Alton Towers in England. Manufactured by Intamin, the ride opened to the public on 20 March 2010 as the world's first roller coaster to feature a vertical freefall drop, where the track and train fall approximately 5 metres (16 ft) in darkness. The ride replaced Corkscrew, which operated at Alton Towers from 1980 to 2008.

== Development ==
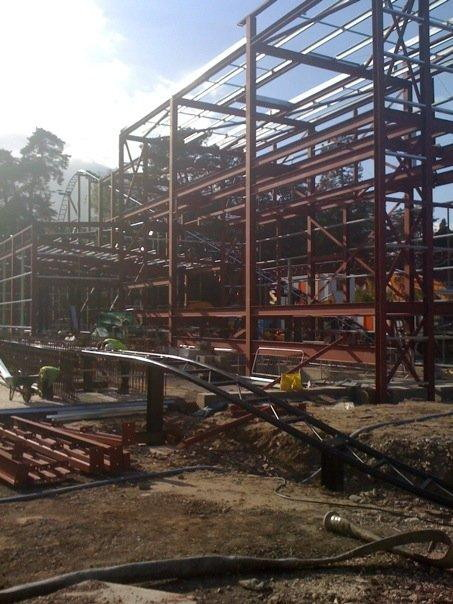
Thirteen under construction in October 2009

Alton Towers first revealed their plans for the ride in October 2008 when it was announced that Corkscrew would be removed. Planning permission was initially delayed due to concerns about an Iron Age hill fort in its vicinity. However, in March 2009, Staffordshire Moorlands District Council accepted planning permission for the ride (with conditions) and groundwork construction commenced about three months later. During the planning stages and construction, the ride was codenamed Secret Weapon 6.

John Wardley, a ride consultant for Merlin Entertainments, spoke about the development of Thirteen in an interview shortly after the ride's opening. The initial idea for the secret element originated from a previous rollercoaster plan that he designed for Alton Towers, in which a piece of track tilted back and forth during the ride. The ride, if it had been built, would have been similar to Winja's Fear & Force at Phantasialand, Germany.

The ageing Corkscrew roller coaster was removed ahead of the new ride's development. The coaster model was decided as an Intamin family coaster, chosen for the lightweight trains to perform the vertical drop element.

The concept and theme was produced by Merlin. In 2008, concept art showing possible themes for the new ride were leaked online but were soon deleted at Alton Towers' request.

== Ride experience ==
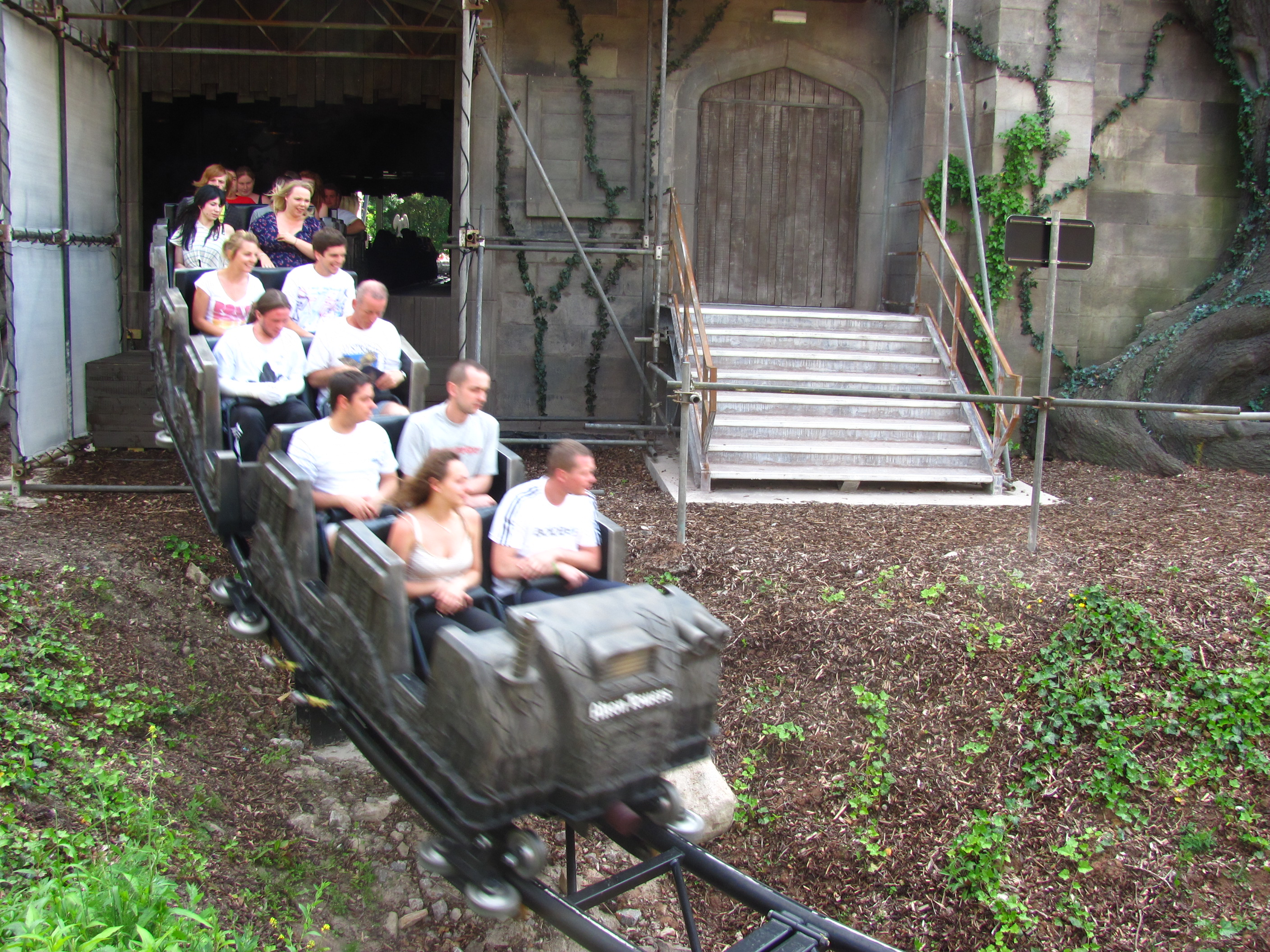
One of the ride's trains exiting the station

As the train departs the station, a girl's voice is heard whispering, "If you go down to the woods today, you'd better not go alone," before the train takes a left turn out of the station and into a 60-foot (18 m) lift hill. The following drop then sends the train speeding into a wooded area at a maximum speed of 41 mph. The following layout includes several airtime hills and banked turns, before ascending a short second lift hill.

This leads the train into the upper level of the station building and a shutter closes behind the train as it comes to a halt. The sound of creaking wood is heard before the horizontal track section jolts, then free-falls vertically (together with the train and floor section) to a lower level. Here several statues light up, before the train moves backwards out of the building and descends a short drop into an underground tunnel.

The train completes a backwards helix in the tunnel, then re-emerges outside and stops. A transfer track then reverses the direction of the train, as it is propelled forwards and arrives at the offload platform.

Sections of the outdoor track have been fitted with speed-reducing devices due to early problems with the ride entering its second lift hill too quickly.

== Promotion ==
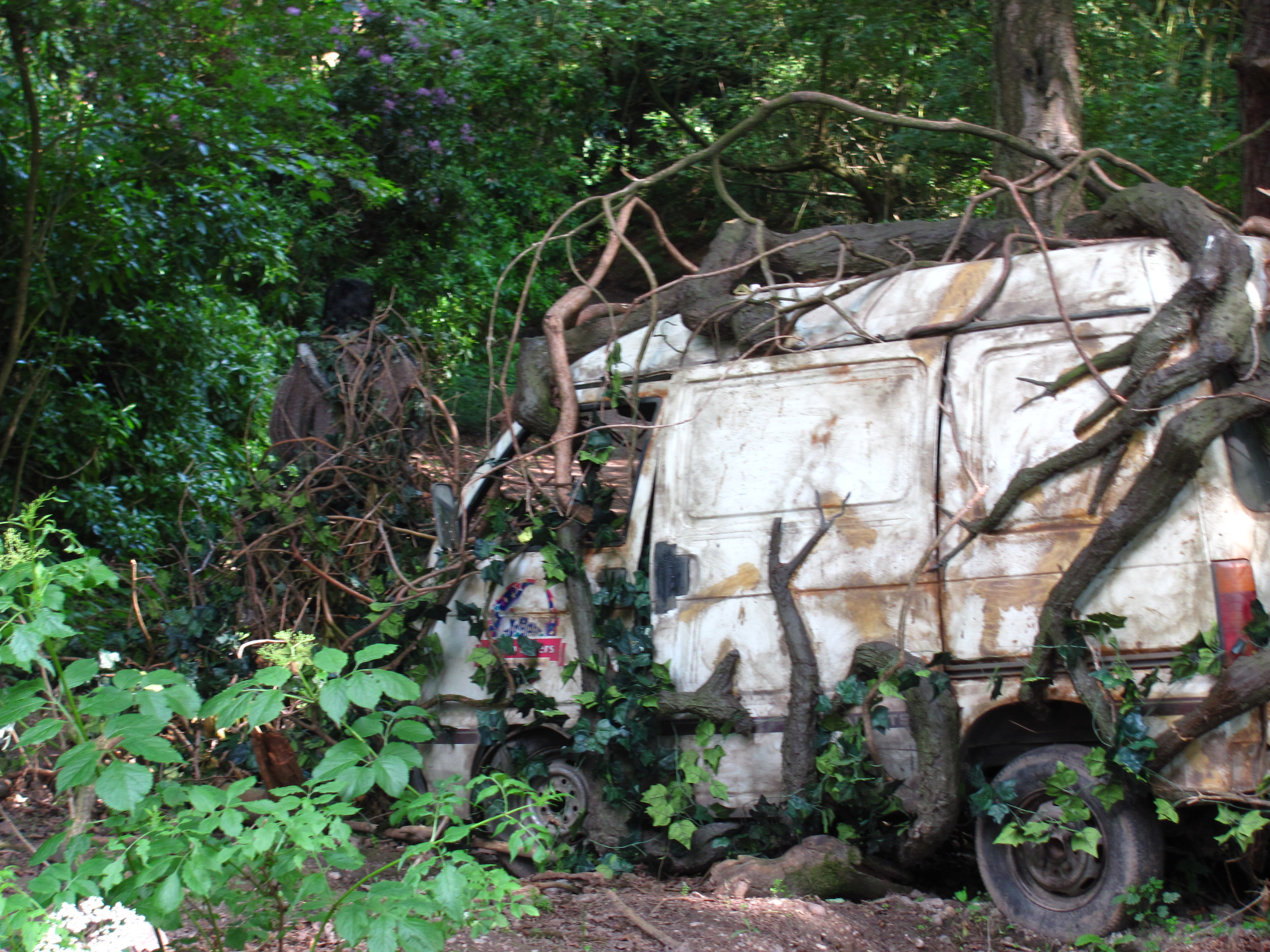
Some of Thirteen's theming

Since the project was announced in late 2008, it was promoted that the ride would feature a secret "world's first" element. In a press statement released several months after construction started, the ride was promoted as a 'psychoaster' and was said to create a level of psychological fear. The park's marketing team made an effort to keep the "world's first" element secret so that the surprise feature would not be revealed until the ride was opened.

Various phrases and slogans were used to promote the ride. In August, a banner was erected next to the construction site on 8 October reading: "Ride into the Unknown". Alton Towers released a new marketing campaign later inviting readers to "Ride the Demon of the Dark Forest" and "Surrender in March 2010". However, neither of these campaigns expressly revealed the name of the new ride. The attraction's name was officially announced as Thirteen on 11 December 2009 through a press release. The ride's main slogan was used after: "If you go down to the woods today, you'd better not go alone."

During the park's 2009 Scarefest, hooded wraiths were seen roaming around the Ug Land area in the build-up to the new ride. Warning signs were put up explaining their appearance was linked to "next year's new ride".

An early press release stated that Thirteen would require a signed waiver of liability to ride and that there would be a rider age restriction of 16–55 years old. However, no such restrictions were ever a reality.

The resort has also used viral marketing through social-networking websites to promote the ride. Alton Towers released many online and television teaser videos in the run up to the opening of the ride. These included a video of a truck supposedly delivering the "secret weapon", and three promotional blipverts which featured a possessed girl walking in a forest. The full adverts were released before opening day, with a pre-watershed and post-watershed version. The advertisement to be shown after 9 pm included the same girl seen in previous videos being entangled by moving branches as she whispered: "If you go down to the woods today, you'd better not go alone... 13". The advert also uses a short but 'darker' rendition of the Alton Towers theme music (Edvard Grieg's In the Hall of the Mountain King), driven mainly by the harp and piano.

It was revealed on 17 March 2010, that the ride was the "world's first free-fall drop roller coaster". This was shown on GMTV, on a special feature about Thirteen and also had an on-ride video of some of the first riders. A view of the ride was also shown on Central Tonight, and shows the freefall section in brighter lighting than GMTV had shown earlier on in the day.

On 22 July 2010, Alton Towers announced on their Facebook page that Thirteen would be closed on Friday 13 August 2010, because of superstitious reasons. Morwenna Angove, Head of Marketing at the Resort, stated: "Our research has revealed that Britons are a seriously superstitious bunch, and as our latest ride is named after the unluckiest of numbers, we've taken the decision to close that ride on Friday 13 to reassure our visitors." It was later revealed that the ride was to be renamed 'Fourteen' (stylized as FOU13TEEN) throughout Friday 13 August 2010 instead of closing. New limited merchandise was available during the day featuring the 'Fourteen' name. Most signage to the ride was temporarily changed to feature the new name.
