= Medieval Torture Museum =

Museum in St. Augustine, Florida

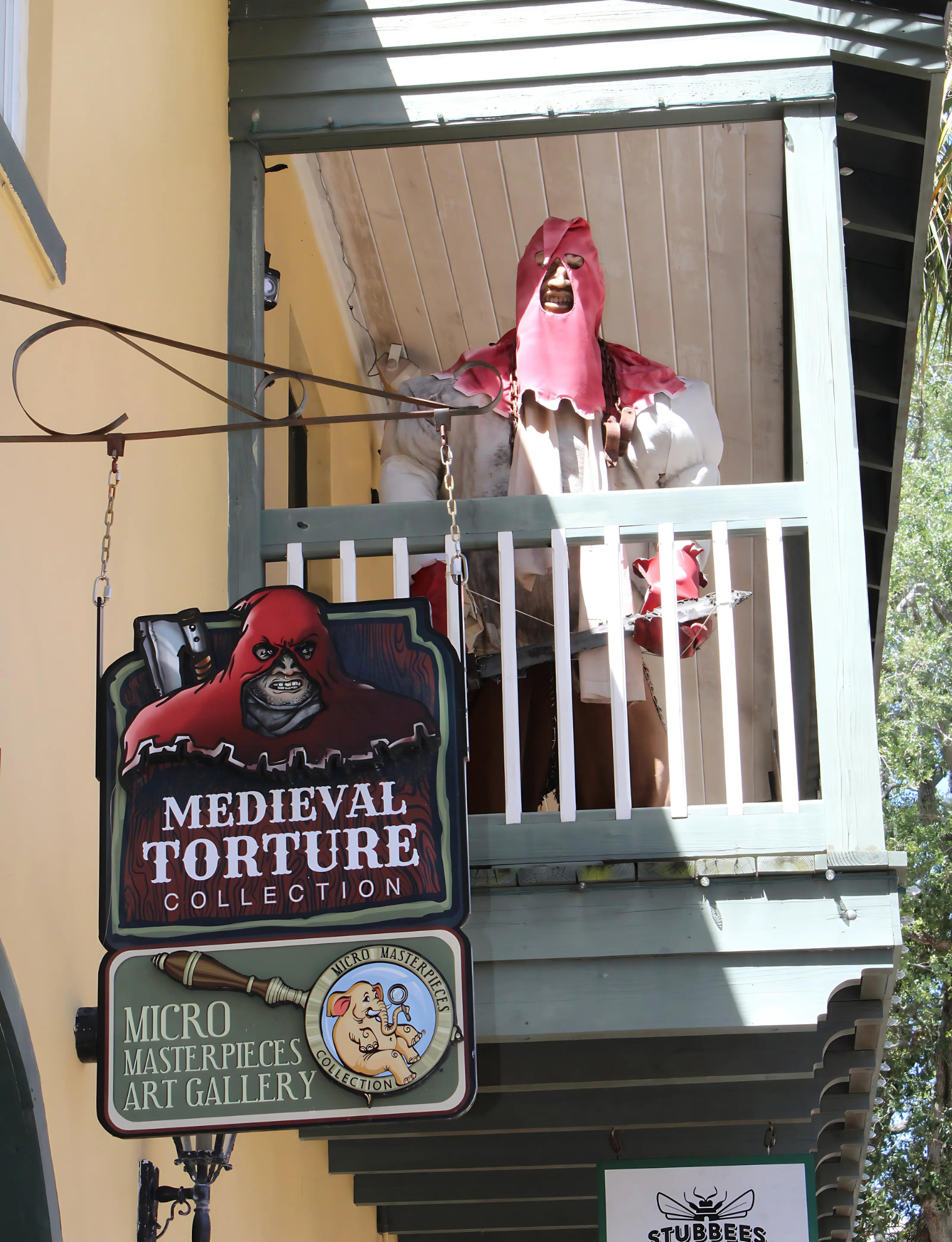
- Outside the entrance – Sept 2024

- Location within Florida
- Established: 2017
- Location: 100 Saint George Street; St. Augustine, Florida, United States
- Coordinates: 29.8946°N 81.3130°W
- Visitors: 200.000 (2019)
- Website: medievaltorturemuseum

The Medieval Torture Museum is the largest interactive torture museum in the United States, displaying a private collection of torture, execution and restraint devices. The museum is a product of BenAur company and is located in the cities of St. Augustine, Chicago and Los Angeles.

== History ==
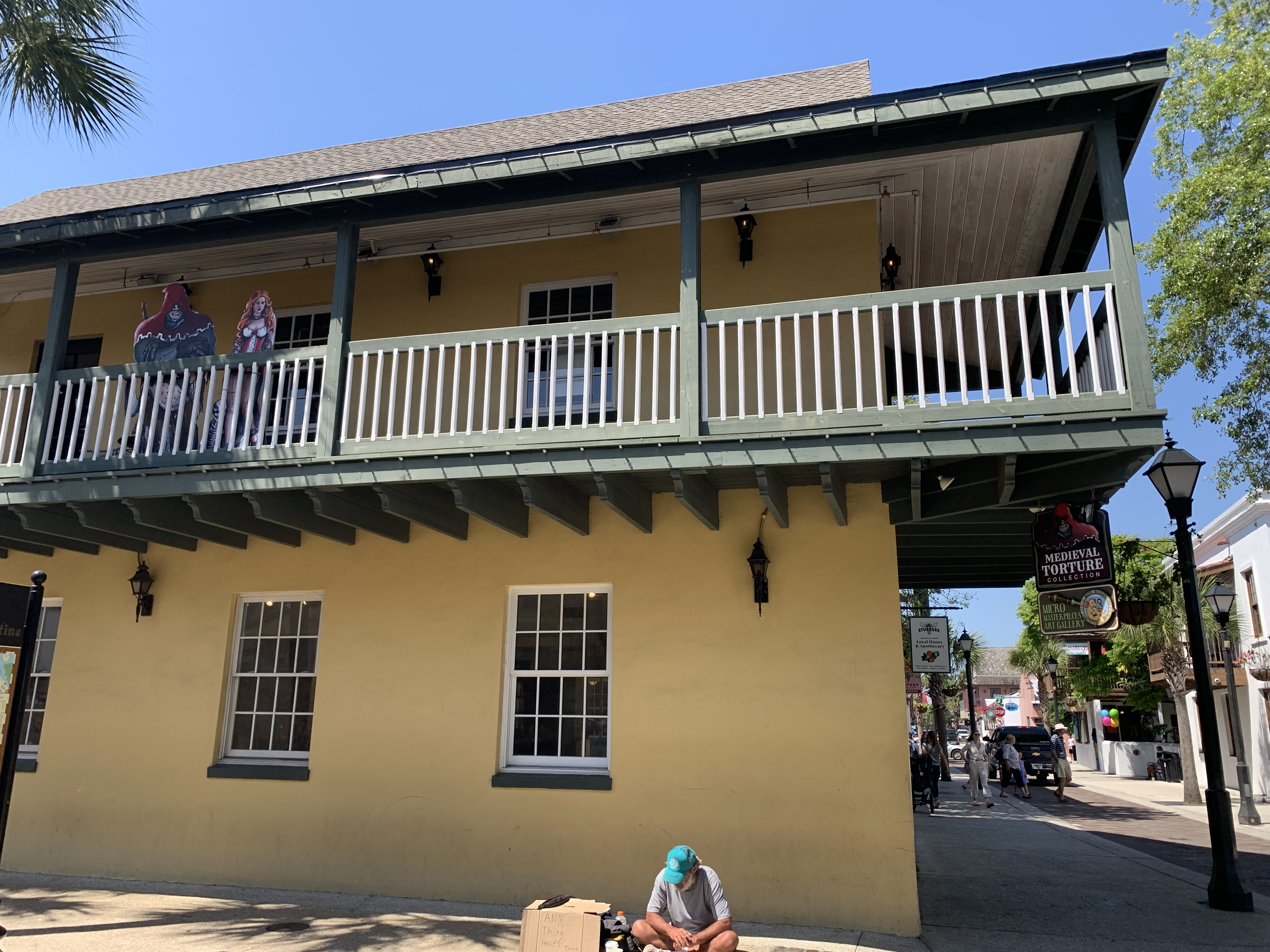
Medieval Torture Museum

The idea of creating a museum where visitors could feel the emotional side of the torture chamber was inspired by a visit to the torture museum in the Czech Republic, where there was only old dilapidated equipment that was exhibited behind glass, which did not instill a natural, emotional reaction.

To re-create the gloomy atmosphere of the European Middle Ages, the project had to enlist historians, blacksmiths, prop masters, painters, costume designers, sculptors and other professionals. The museum was opened in the summer of 2017, in historic St. Augustine, Florida, on Saint George Street, which is one of the oldest streets in America. As of the summer of 2019, over 200,000 people had visited the Medieval Torture Museum.

In the fall of 2021, the second location of the Medieval Torture Museum was opened in Chicago, in the building of the Theater of Chicago (the Loop area).

== Conception ==
Each museum exhibit belongs to a certain period in history, which allows us to trace the most destructive side of human ingenuity from the Dark Ages to the present. One of the mottos of Medieval Torture Museum: "Those who forget their history are doomed to repeat it." The main mission of the Museum exposition is to recall how much suffering can be caused with the power placed into the hands of fanatics, madmen and tyrants. On the other hand, each visitor is offered an emotional attraction through which they will be able to explore the dark aspects of their psyche.

== Exposition ==
Medieval Torture Museum is a modern interactive museum in which interaction with exhibits continues the main exposition. Visitors can play the role of executioners and their victims. They are able to sit in the spiked chair of inquiries, pose in a "barrel for drunkards" or weigh themselves on special scales to see if they are too heavy to be deemed a witch. Among other things the visitor is able to try on the Spanish boot, stand in the pillory, drown a witch in a barrel of water, lead the guillotine, the pendulum and other deadly torture devices.

To illustrate the principle of action and create an artistic effect, many instruments of torture and execution are shown together with the character – the victim of torture, or the executioner. Each character is a highly realistic mannequin dressed in a historically accurate costume. Additional emotional immersion is caused by the stories of the characters, which describe life, circumstances, occupation, and crimes for which they were sentenced to torture or execution, as well as details of the torture itself.

The description of the exhibits is available in the format of an audio guide – an explanatory soundtrack voiced by a professional actor. Some exhibits of the museum are implemented in the format of stands for photography.

Museum stands are complemented by numerous engravings and descriptions of tools, so that visitors will be able to increase their historical erudition.

Most of the exhibits are dedicated to the Middle Ages and the Renaissance. The exhibition also contains instruments of torture of antiquity (for example, the Sicilian Bull, snake pit) and some devices from the arsenal of later eras (garrote, electric chair).

== Awards ==
In 2019 the Florida weekly FOLIO published a rating "Best of Saint Augustine 2019", in which the Medieval Torture Museum took 4th place in the Best Museum nomination.

The museum received a Certificate of Excellence from the TripAdvisor platform, which is issued to accommodations, attractions and restaurants that consistently earn great reviews from travelers.

== Historical Controversies ==
Although these types of museums are famous around the world, they often present a distorted, sensationalist, or exaggerated view of the "Dark Ages". Although history was full of violence, these types of museums often display imaginative torture devices that are often passed off as real (one example is the "Iron maiden," the most famous of medieval historical fakes). Many of them were in fact conceived in periods far removed from the Middle Ages, especially during the 19th century.
