= Dungeon! (video game) =

1982 video game

- Developer: TSR Hobbies
- Publisher: TSR Hobbies
- Platform: Apple II
- Release: 1982
- Genre: Role-playing
- Mode: Single-player

Dungeon! is a video game adaptation of the role-playing board game Dungeon! It was released for the Apple II in 1982 by TSR.

== Reception ==
Harry White reviewed Dungeon! for Fantasy Gamer magazine and stated that "TSR's initial entry into computer gaming is a success. A gaggle of eight- to 13-year-old neighborhood playtesters says so. The 50-yearold father of part of that gaggle agrees that Dungeon! is worth the reasonable price tag. A ridiculously pretentious licensing agreement included and the [...] cost for a backup disk should not detract from the charm of the game for role-playing beginners and families."

The Apple II version of Dungeon! was well received, gaining a Certificate of Merit in the category of "1984 Best Multi-Player Video Game/Computer Game" at the 5th annual Arkie Awards.
