= The Dungeon (Dimension Six) =

Role playing game supplement

The Dungeon is a 1980 role-playing game supplement published by Dimension Six.

== Contents ==
The Dungeon is a set of interchangeable pieces that fit together to construct dungeon scenes for use with 25mm scale miniature figures.

== Reception ==
Steve Jackson reviewed The Dungeon in The Space Gamer No. 31. Jackson commented that "If you're a miniatures fan, you ought to look at these. The only real problem is that they're meant for a square-grid layout. If you use a hex-grid system like DragonQuest or TFT, The Dungeon will do you much less good."
