= Torture museum =

Museum exhibiting torture devices

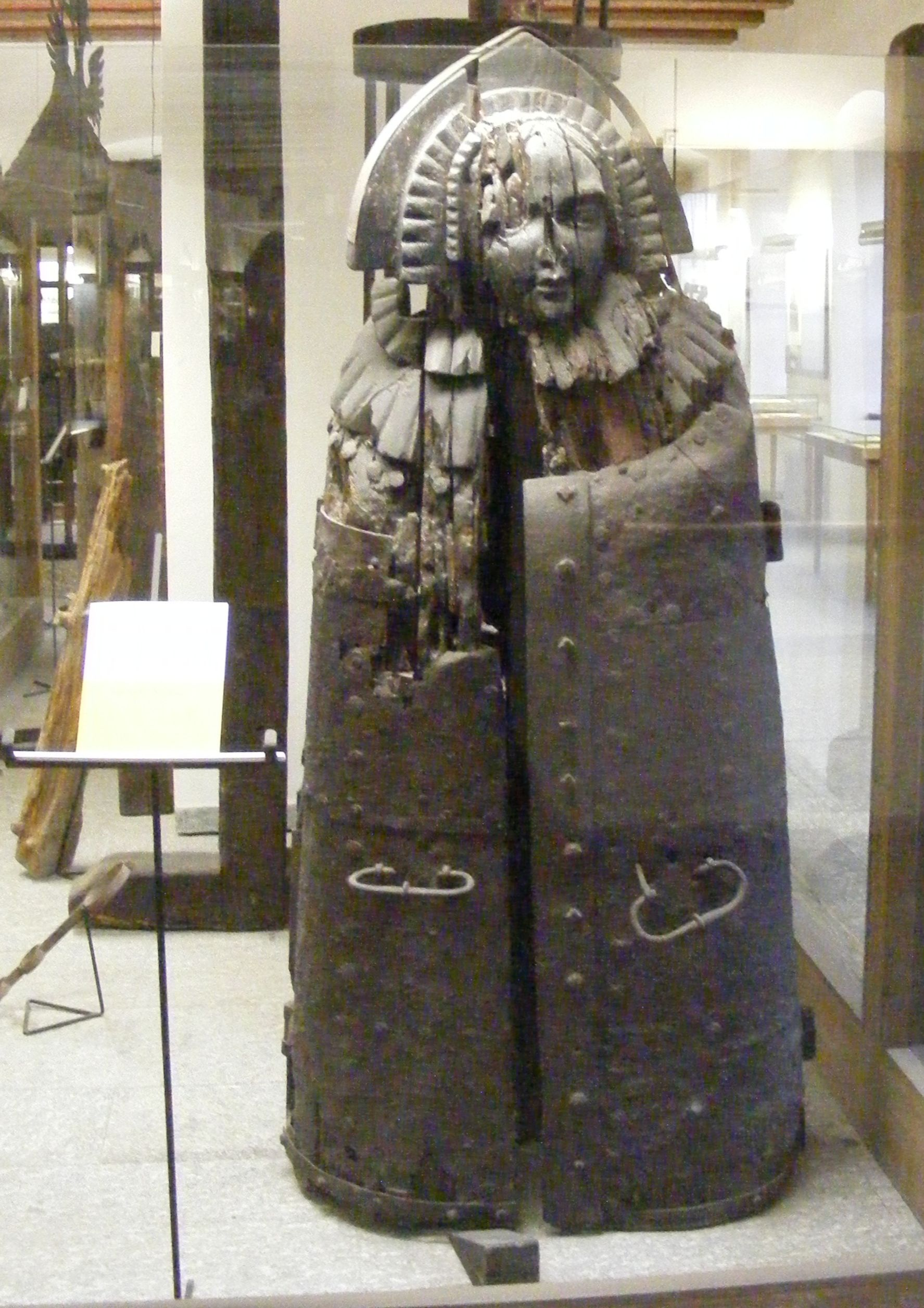
Copy of the Iron maiden of Nuremberg, on display in Rothenburg ob der Tauber

A torture museum is a museum that exhibits instruments of torture and provides an insight on the history of torture and its use in human society. Several museums dedicated to the history of torture are located worldwide. Many of the medieval-based museums exhibit fake items, devices which were seldom or never used in real history, particularly in the "Middle Age", such as "Iron maidens" or "breast rippers", which may have been used only in the ancient Roman empire.

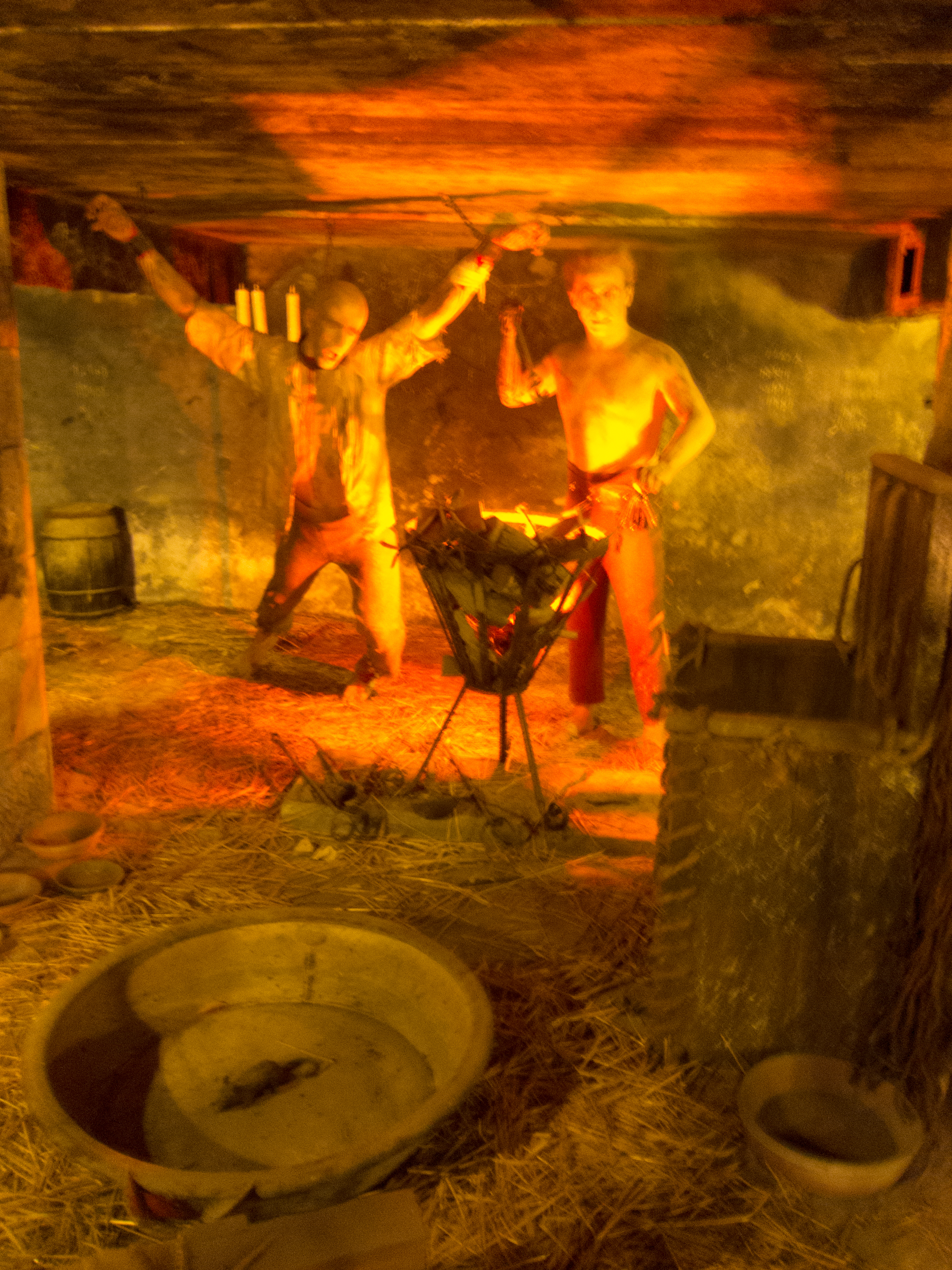
Medieval torture scene inside the torture chamber (or "dungeon") of Bamburgh Castle, England (it was probably a coal store rather than a genuine medieval dungeon).

== Historical Controversies ==
Although these types of museums are famous around the world, they often present a distorted, sensationalist, or exaggerated view of the "Dark Ages". Although history was full of violence, these types of museums often display imaginative torture devices that are often passed off as real. Many of them were in fact conceived in periods far removed from the Middle Ages, especially during the 19th century.

== Torture museums ==
=== Europe ===
Examples of the torture museums in Europe include:

- In Spain:
  - Museo de la Tortura in Toledo, Spain
  - Galeria de la Inquisicion in Cordoba, Spain
  - Torture Museum in Santillana del Mar, Spain
  - Medieval Torture Museum in El Castell de Guadalest, Spain
- In Germany
  - Mediaeval Torture Museum (Mittelalterliches Foltermuseum) in Rüdesheim am Rhein, Germany
  - Medieval Crime Museum (das Kriminalmuseum) in Rothenburg ob der Tauber, Germany
- In Italy
  - Museo della Tortura di Siena in Siena, Italy
  - Medieval Criminal and Torture Museum (Museo della Tortura e di Criminologia Medievale) in San Gimignano, Italy
- In Netherlands
  - Torture Museum, Amsterdam, Netherlands
  - Museum of Medieval Torture Instruments, Amsterdam, Netherlands
- Torture Museum (Foltermuseum auf Burg Sommereck) in Spittal an der Drau, Austria
- Torture Museum Oude Steen in Bruges, Belgium
- Tortureum Museum of Torture in Zagreb, Croatia
- Museum of Medieval Torture Instruments in Prague, Czech Republic
- Torture Exhibition near Castelul Corvinilor in Hunedoara, Romania
- Torture Museum in San Marino

The Museum of Medieval Torture Instruments was opened in 2012 in Amsterdam, Netherlands. It uses human size wax figures to increase the interactive learning of what the Dark Ages considered to be torture.

=== Asia ===
Examples of the torture museums in Asia include:

- Tuol Sleng Genocide Museum in Phnom Penh, Cambodia
- Unit 731 Museum in Harbin, China

=== North America ===
The largest torture museums in North America:

- The Medieval Torture Museum in the cities of St. Augustine, Florida and Chicago, Illinois
- Medieval Torture Museum in Hollywood, California
- Museum Of Man's Instruments Of Torture in San Diego, California
- Museum Of Historic Torture Devices in Wisconsin Dells, Wisconsin
- Museo de la Tortura in Mexico City, Mexico
- Museo de la Tortura Veracruz, Mexico

== See also ==
- Medieval instruments of torture
- Torture chamber
