= Amsterdam Dungeon =

Haunted attraction in the Netherlands

The Amsterdam Dungeon
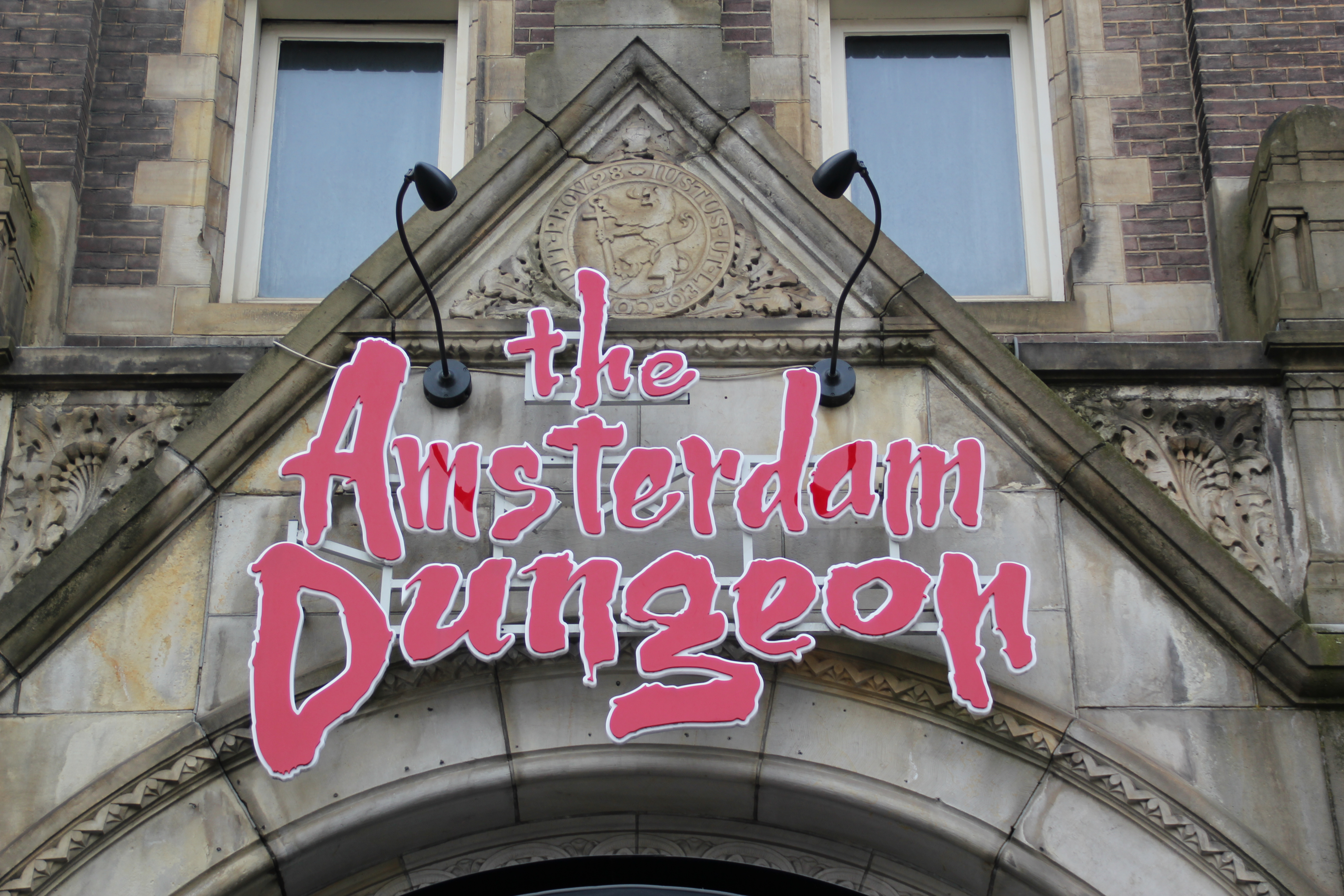

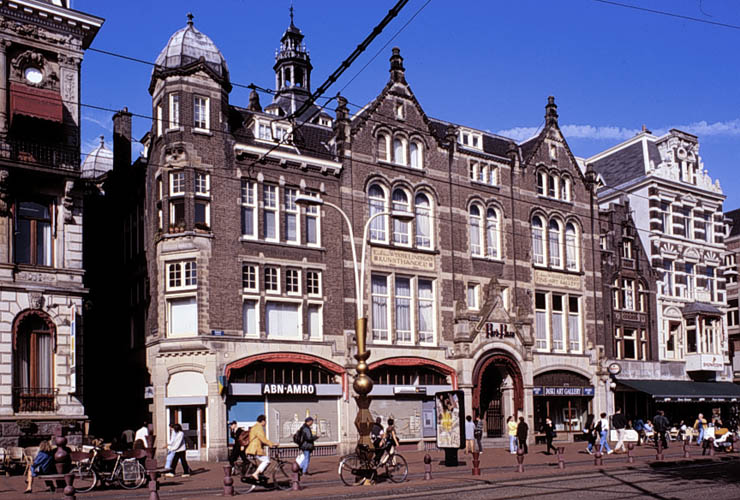

- Location within Amsterdam
- Established: 1 September 2005; 20 years ago
- Location: Rokin 78, Amsterdam, The Netherlands
- Coordinates: 52.3702°N 4.8921°E
- Website: https://www.thedungeons.com/amsterdam/en/

The Amsterdam Dungeon is a haunted attraction in central Amsterdam, Netherlands. It depicts history through an interactive adventure, using live actors, a ride, shows and special effects to simulate historical dark and bleak times. The attraction is owned and operated by British company Merlin Entertainments, and is similar to Merlin's other properties, the London Dungeon, York Dungeon, Berlin Dungeon and Hamburg Dungeon. It opened in September 2005.

== Building ==
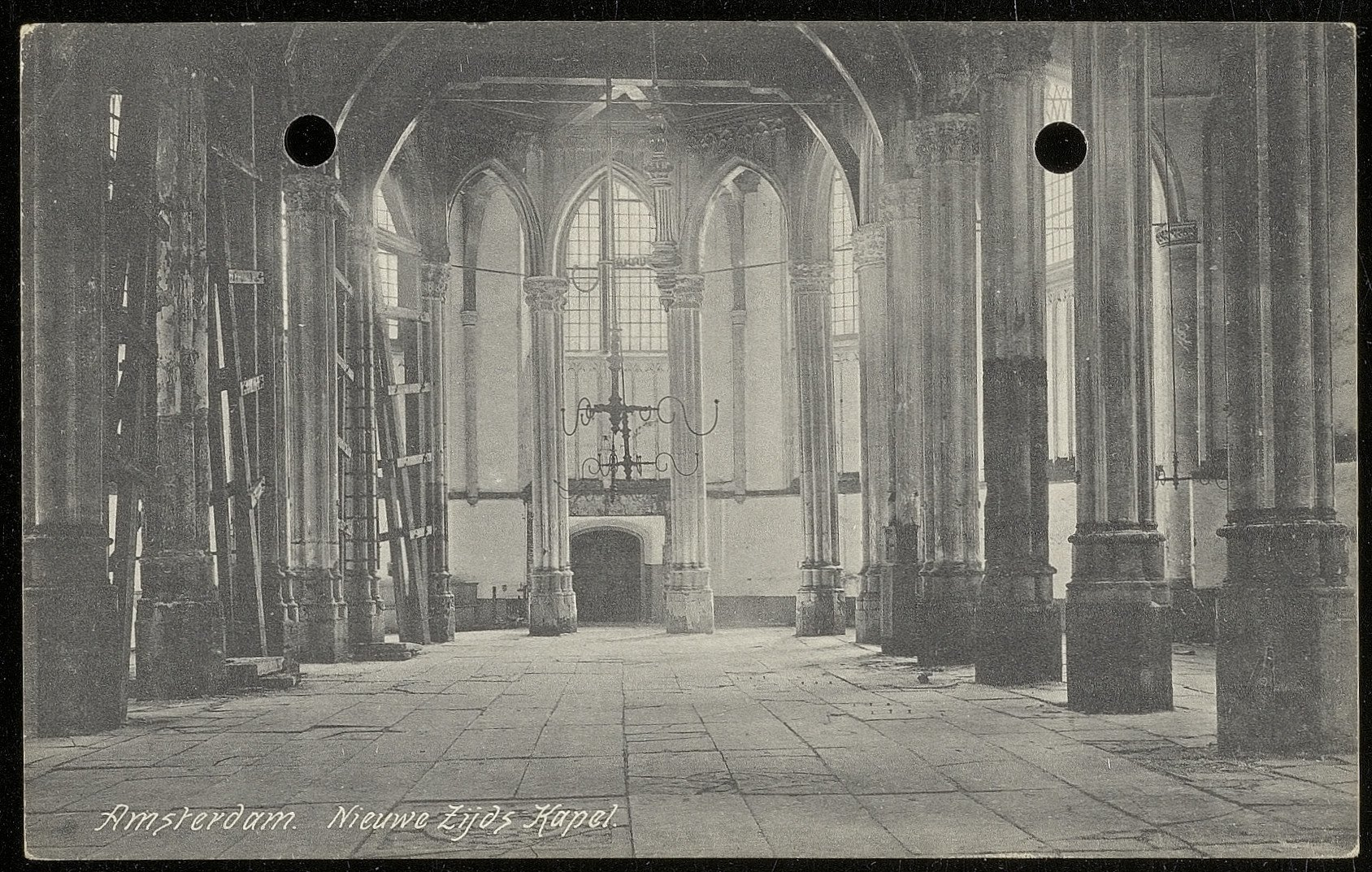
Interior of the Nieuwezijdse Kapel in 1920.

The Amsterdam Dungeon, its backstage areas and its offices were built into a church known as the Nieuwezijdse Kapel, which closed in 1970. No parts of the original church were demolished and, if needed, the Dungeon and all its sets can be removed from the building so it may function as a church once more.

Inside, no part of the church is visible to the Dungeon's visitors. On the Gallow's Field, only the actor's echoing voice betrays its location in the very dome of the church.

== Attractions ==
- The Descent (1617): A character known as the Black Jester explains the rules to the visitors and sends the visitors into the elevators, which seem to be taking them far down into the Dungeon.
- The talking head of Balthasar Gerards, the assassin of William of Orange. In graphic detail, he explains the various methods through which he was executed.
- Torture Chamber (1545): The Torture Chamber is the most graphically implied exhibit in the entire Dungeon. The (female) torturer lines up the 'prisoners' against a wall and picks out a young male visitor for the demonstration. The visitor is strapped in to a chair surrounded by torture devices, such as the dreaded appendage cutter, the torturer places the appendage cutter near the male's groin and 'demonstrates' the device 'inch by inch'.
- The Flying Dutchman (1651): In a louche bar called 't Aepjen, a Landlord tells the story of Captain Hendrik van der Decken, known as the Flying Dutchman, whose ghost is expected to visit their bar tonight. The audience then sees a technical show.
- Black John (1656): In Dr. Deyman's anatomy theatre, a Cleaner eagerly examines the body of the murderer Black John, who is to be painted by Rembrandt the next day. While showing the audience the various body parts, they are disturbed by Dr. Deyman's knocking, and the Cleaner quickly hides everyone in the body room, where Dr. Deyman keeps his corpses.
- Council of Blood (1571): In an inquisition court during the Eighty Years' War, Judge Vargos of the Council of Blood judges three sinful visitors in name of King Philip II of Spain. One is guilty of being from a certain place, one is guilty of being a 'fashion killer', and, worst of all, one visitor is convicted of being a witch.
- Labyrinth of Lost Amsterdam: A disorientating and eerie mirror maze themed around the winding, disorientating streets of Amsterdam.
- The Witch Burning (1542): On the Nieuwmarkt, a Witch Hunter asks the audience to turn on one another and bring forward a witch. The witch is then promptly burned on a stake as part of a pyrotechnic show, before being declared as shockingly alive still, and earning her diploma for witchcraft.
- The Gallows' Field (1664): The audience is brought to the fields outside Amsterdam, where the executed criminals are hung, and led through treacherous tunnels in the dark.The Nightwatch shows them the body of Elsje Christiaens, and then nearly kills one of the visitors, kept in a cage, but finds out their name is not actually on the list. The Nightwatch offers to let everyone go, if one brave soul enters their hand into a small hole in the wall to retrieve a key. When an audience member obeys, they are let go.
- Murder on the Zeedijk (1753): In an old tannery, a tanner tells the ghosty story of jealous Helena, who murdered her sister Dina and was cursed forever. The audience then sees a technical show.

== Former Attractions ==
- The Key Keeper: a character resembling a figure from Rembrandt's The Night Watch explains the rules to the visitors and send them 'down' into the Dungeon. It was closed in 2021, and replaced by the Black Jester.
- Rembrandt's Secret: the audience is shown the artist Rembrandt's dark side when told about how he had his lover, Geertje Dircx, locked in a house of correction for twelve years. It opened in 2009 and closed in 2011.
- The Soul Merchant/VOC: An 18th-century dockside bar teaches about press ganging of locals to join the nautical trading firm, the Dutch East India Company (VOC). They are then ambushed and forced to board a replica ship, where they are forced to work for the captain Piet Heyn and fight the Spanish. It was closed in 2021, and replaced by the Flying Dutchman.
- Ship's Doctor: Looks at ship's doctor's surgery, where the surgeon gives witness of the brutalities of 18th century field surgery at sea.
- The Great Plague: A recreation of the streets of plague ravaged Amsterdam street, where the devastating effect the killer disease had in the city in 1664 is vividly animated. Replaced by the Witch Hunter in 2013.
- Reaper: Drop Ride to Doom, is a MACK Rides e-Motion roller coaster that winds around a real 13th century church and featuring its original organ. Themed upon the Grim Reaper legend, it provides a finale to the Dungeon experience. The ride has been closed since 1 May 2014, and was replaced by the Gallow's Field in 2018.
- The Last Shot: A barkeeper known as Mr./Mrs. Spank congratulated the visitors on surviving their various ordeals and celebrated with a drink. It was closed on 30 June 2024.

== Timeline of shows ==
Show	Year																				
Show	2005	2006	2007	2008	2009	2010	2011	2012	2013	2014	2015	2016	2017	2018	2019	2020	2021	2022	2023	2024	2025
The Descent (Key Keeper)	Appears																				
Torturer	Appears																				
The Soul Merchant	Appears																				
VOC/ Ship's Doctor	Appears																				
Black John	Appears																				
Council of Blood	Appears																				
Rembrandt's Secret					Appears																
The Great Plague	Appears																				
Reaper: Drop Ride to Doom	Appears																				
Murder on the Zeedijk										Appears											
The Last Shot										Appears											
The Witch Burning									Appears												
The Gallows' Field										Appears											
The Descent (Black Jester)																Appears					
The Flying Dutchman																	Appears				

== Trivia ==
- The eight shows are ranked by a Scare-o-Meter from 1 to 5, with 1 being the least scary, and 5 the scariest. The Torture Chamber, Council of Blood and the Witch Hunter are all rated 2. The Descent and Black John are rated 3. The Gallow's Field is rated 4, and the Flying Dutchman and Murder on the Zeedijk are deemed the scariest show and rated 5.
- The Amsterdam Dungeon features a prop grave belonging to the painter Rembrandt van Rijn (who is mentioned in one of the shows). While it is very convincing, Rembrandt van Rijn is actually buried in the Westerkerk, a different church in Amsterdam. However, the Nieuwezijdse Kapel is built on top of several real graves, none of which are visible to the Dungeon's visitors.

== Parent company ==
The Amsterdam Dungeon also has sister sites in the London Dungeon, Warwick Castle Dungeon, York Dungeon, Edinburgh Dungeon, Berlin Dungeon and Hamburg Dungeon. Each Dungeon is based on the same theme but investigates the history of its own local area. The Dungeons are owned by Poole-based Merlin Entertainments.
