= York Dungeon =

Tourist attraction in York, England

The York Dungeon
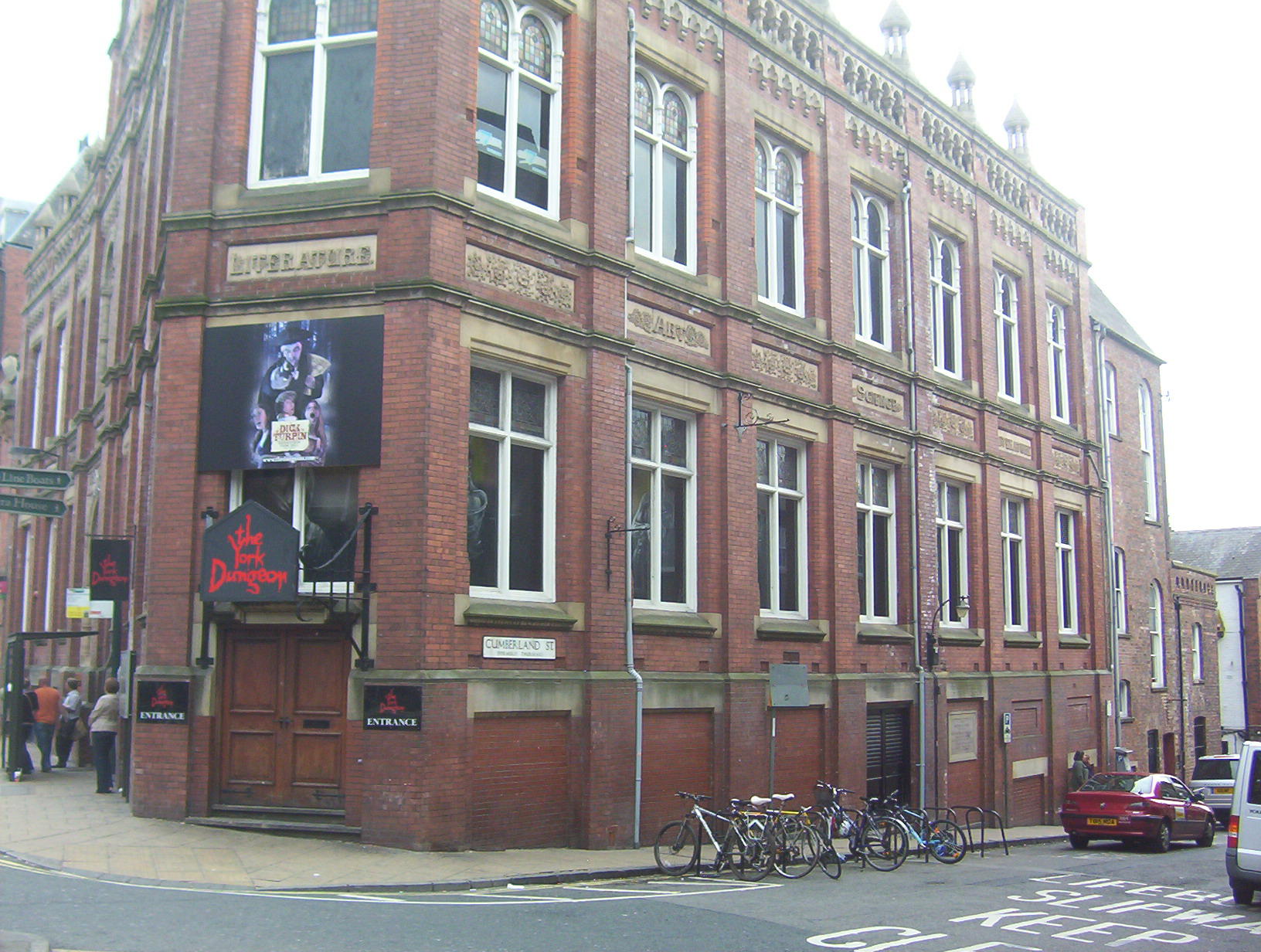

- Location within North Yorkshire
- Established: 1986
- Location: York, England
- Coordinates: 53.95680°N 1.08216°W
- Public transit access: York railway station
- Website: www.thedungeons.com/york/en/

York Dungeon is a tourist attraction in York, England. York Dungeon depicts history of the dungeon using actor led shows, special effects and displays of models and objects.

The York Dungeon reopened in March 2013 after a period of closure due to severe flooding.

== History ==
York Dungeon was opened in 1986 at 12 Clifford Street, York, England. It was the second Dungeon attraction created, the first being the London Dungeon in 1975. Like the London Dungeon, it was designed as a live action interactive horror show loosely based on factual events throughout history.

As part of a £3.5 million investment across both Dungeons, a new feature opened in 1997 showcasing tales of the 'Lost Roman legion' in York. Further additions and expansions continued with a Plague section encounter in a Plague doctor's surgery. 2002 saw the opening of 'Gorvik' (the name a pun on 'Jorvik', the kings name for York), which detailed the Viking history of the City and brutal attacks from Viking forces. Other attractions included the Torture Chamber, The Gunpowder Plot, Dick Turpin, and the Courtroom. 2003 saw the arrival of the Witch Trials that detailed the witch trials in York through the use of a detailed set and animatronics. This area subsequently became the 'Ghosts of York' show in 2007.

Like London, over time, the Dungeon evolved from a museum to an actor led experience. The Dungeon remains the smallest of the dungeons chain.

The Dungeon has been subject to severe flooding numerous times, due to its close proximity to the River Ouse. This has occurred in 2001, 2004 and twice in 2012, leading to a complete refurbishment. Many exhibits were totally refurbished, particularly the torture chamber which as a result was drastically reduced in size, had most of the original exhibits removed, and script rewrites to focus on actor-guest interaction instead.

As with entire Dungeons brand, the York Dungeon received a rebranding in 2013 to coincide with the relocation of the London Dungeon. This included a new set of scripts and additional comedy elements to shows.

== Exhibits and shows ==
The Dungeon operates on the basis of tours which start every 7 minutes and last between 1 and 1.5 hours. In these tours visitors are led around a sequence of shows and exhibitions which are loosely based on historical events and practices.

The Great Plague show is set in 1551 in a recreation of a plague doctor's surgery, led by one of the recently deceased plague doctor's assistants. Other shows include a courtroom in which visitors are accused of various crimes and a torture chamber in which visitors are shown demonstrations of torture devices. During the tour actors playing plague doctors' assistants, innkeepers, night watches, torturers, judges, executioners, stage coach guards and witch-burners tell visitors gruesome stories. Whilst the Dungeon does not have the space to accommodate any rides like its sister incarnations, the Dick Turpin section features 'drop benches' that give sudden movement to simulate a crashing stage coach and animatronics under the seat during a discussion of leeches to simulate their feel.

== Criticism ==
The Christian community in York raised concerns in 2004 about a Christmas show at the dungeon called Satan's Grotto and asked the dungeon to stop the show. Reverend Roger Simpson of St Michael-le-Belfrey church said "There are real evil forces . . . We are concerned the attraction has the potential to do real pastoral harm." A spokesman from York Dungeon's responded that it was "all tongue-in-cheek" and should not be taken seriously."

York Dungeon offered free entry to people subject to anti-social behaviour orders (ASBOs) for the weekend of the 26 May and 27 May 2007. The dungeon was "widely condemned for a controversial decision" with criticism coming from victims of crime, York Councillors and Hugh Bayley, the Member of Parliament for the City of York, who commented:

This is a publicity-seeking gimmick which goes too far. The public needs protection from anti-social behaviour and York Dungeon shouldn't be rewarding people who have been sentenced to an ASBO by the courts.

The manager of York Dungeon said "I thought it might shock the ASBO offenders a little to see what would have happened to them a couple of hundred years ago", but the Dungeon reported that no one took up their offer of free admission.

== See also ==
- Hamburg Dungeon
- The Amsterdam Dungeon
- The London Dungeon
