= Nick Varney =

British businessman (born 1962)

Sir Nick Varney
- Born: Nicholas John Varney; 1962 (age 63–64)
- Occupation: Businessman

Sir Nicholas John Varney (born 1962) is a British businessman who was the chief executive officer of attractions operator Merlin Entertainments. He held this position from 1999 until 2022.

== Biography ==
Varney attended the London School of Economics before becoming a junior marketer in the mid-1980s, later progressing to senior roles. He has over 24 years experience in the visitor attractions industry and was appointed chief executive officer of Merlin Entertainments in 1999. He was later appointed a Director of the company on 20 October 2013.

Nick started his career in marketing, first with Rowntree and then with Reckitt Colman. He went on to hold senior positions within The Tussauds Group, including marketing director of Alton Towers and Head of Group Marketing, before becoming managing director of Vardon Attractions and a main board director of Vardon. In 1999, he led the management buyout of Vardon Attractions, majority owned by funds managed or advised by Apax Partners, to form Merlin Entertainments and, following subsequent private equity funded secondary buyouts, initiated the process which led to its acquisition by the Blackstone Group.

In 2011, he stated his belief that free admission to British museums and art galleries were primarily used by "foreign tourists and middle class people who can afford it." In business circles, he is widely seen as an aggressive marketer and was quoted in 2011, as saying "if you can get out of our attractions without buying tickets for the others, well, good luck."

In 2013 Nick Varney was awarded an honorary doctorate by Staffordshire University "In recognition of his considerable business success on a global scale."

On 29 April 2022, it was announced that Varney would be retiring from the company and he left in November 2022.

Varney was knighted in the 2023 Birthday Honours for services to the visitor economy.
