= John Wardley =

British roller coaster designer

- Born: John Richard Wardley; 6 June 1950 (age 76); Eastcote, Middlesex, England
- Occupation: Theme park developer
- Known for: Chessington World of Adventures, Prof. Burp's Bubble Works, The Vampire, The Haunted House, Nemesis, Oblivion, Air

John Richard Wardley (born 6 June 1950) is a British developer for theme parks, particularly dark rides and roller coasters. He is known for Nemesis at Alton Towers and other major roller coasters in the UK and Europe.

== Career ==
Wardley started his career as an assistant stage manager at Windsor's Theatre Royal, then moved on to the film industry as a special effects technician. He was subsequently hired to design several attractions at Barry Island Pleasure Park in South Wales for then park director John Collins.

He was later approached by Madame Tussauds after building a homemade animatronic figure that appeared on Tomorrow's World. His first work for Tussauds was as a consultant for the animatronic show "Sixty Glorious Years" at Royalty and Empire in Windsor, Berkshire, opening in 1983.

From 1984, he was hired by head of theme parks for the Tussauds Group, Ray Barratt, to redevelop the declining Chessington Zoo in Greater London to become the Chessington World of Adventures theme park, together with John Collins and others. After the park was a success, Wardley became a park development director for Tussauds and worked on further new attractions at Chessington World of Adventures and Alton Towers through the 1990s, including The Vampire suspended coaster and Prof. Burp's Bubble Works dark ride at Chessington World of Adventures in 1990, and The Haunted House at Alton Towers in 1992.

Wardley went on to develop roller coasters such as Nemesis, Oblivion and Air (now Galactica) at Alton Towers, as well as Dragon Khan and Stampida at PortAventura during the period the park was operated by Tussauds, and Tidal Wave and Colossus at Thorpe Park after its acquisition by Tussauds in 1998.

Following Air's opening in 2002, Wardley left Tussauds. However, Merlin Entertainments took over the company in May 2007 and invited Wardley back as a consultant on various ride projects. He has consulted on attraction developments such as SAW - The Ride and The Swarm at Thorpe Park, TH13TEEN and The Smiler at Alton Towers, and Raptor at Gardaland.

On 22 January 2013, Wardley announced his retirement. Despite retirement, he was invited to consult on the layout for Wicker Man at Alton Towers in 2017.

== Video games ==
- RollerCoaster Tycoon 3 – consultation
- NoLimits Coaster 2 – technical adviser

== Publishing history ==
- Creating My Own Nemesis – print edition (April 2013) – author
- Creating My Own Nemesis – audiobook (December 2017) – author & narrator
- Life After Nemesis – print edition (April 2024) – author
- Life After Nemesis - audiobook (July 2024) - author & narrator

== Attraction projects ==
Year	Ride name	Park	Role	Notes
c.1975	Uncle Frankenstein's Scream Machine	Barry Island	Design	Dark ride
c.1977	Wacky Gold Mine	Barry Island	Design	Dark ride
1980	Log Flume	Barry Island	Design	Log flume
1984	Sixty Glorious Years	Royalty & Empire	Animatronic consultant	Animatronic show; designed by Madame Tussauds.
1987	Dragon River	Chessington World of Adventures	Design	Mack log flume; draft layout and theme designed by John Wardley.
1987	Runaway Train	Chessington World of Adventures	Design	Mack powered coaster; theme designed by John Wardley.
1987	The 5th Dimension	Chessington World of Adventures	Draft layout	Dark Ride; designed by Madame Tussauds, draft layout by John Wardley.
1990	Vampire	Chessington World of Adventures	Development	Arrow suspended swinging roller coaster; draft layout by John Wardley.
1990	Prof. Burp's Bubble Works	Chessington World of Adventures	Development	Dark ride; designed by Sparks Group.
1992	Runaway Mine Train	Alton Towers	Development	Mack powered coaster; draft layout by John Wardley and theme designed by Alton Towers.
1992	The Haunted House	Alton Towers	Development	Dark ride; designed by Sparks Group.
1994	Nemesis	Alton Towers	Development	B&M inverted coaster; draft layout by John Wardley, theme designed by Tussauds Studios and Alton Towers.
1994	Toyland Tours	Alton Towers	Development	Dark ride; designed by Tussauds Studios and Alton Towers.
1994	Terror Tomb	Chessington World of Adventures	Development	Dark ride; designed by Farmer Studios.
1995	Dragon Khan	PortAventura	Draft layout	B&M looping coaster; draft layout by John Wardley.
1996	Megafobia	Oakwood	Draft layout	CCI wooden coaster; draft layout by John Wardley.
1997	Stampida	PortAventura	Draft layout	Twin wooden racing coaster; draft layout by John Wardley.
1998	Oblivion	Alton Towers	Development	B&M dive coaster; theme designed by Tussauds Studios.
2000	Hex – The Legend of the Towers	Alton Towers	Development	Vekoma Madhouse; theme designed by Tussauds Studios.
2002	Air	Alton Towers	Development	B&M flying coaster; draft layout by John Wardley & theme designed by Tussauds Studios.
2002	Colossus	Thorpe Park	Development	Intamin looping coaster; theme designed by Tussauds Studios.
2009	Saw - The Ride	Thorpe Park	Consultant	Gerstlaurer looping coaster; theme designed by Merlin Studios.
2010	Th13teen	Alton Towers	Consultant	Intamin family coaster; theme designed by Merlin Studios.
2011	Raptor	Gardaland	Consultant	B&M wing coaster; theme designed by Merlin Studios.
2012	The Swarm	Thorpe Park	Consultant	B&M wing coaster; theme designed by Merlin Magic Making.
2013	The Smiler	Alton Towers	Consultant	Gerstlaurer looping coaster; theme designed by Merlin Magic Making.
2018	Wicker Man	Alton Towers	Layout consultant	GCI wooden coaster; theme designed by Merlin Magic Making.
2023	The Curse at Alton Manor	Alton Towers	Consultant	Dark ride; produced by Merlin Magic Making.
