= Keith Sparks =

Theme park designer and developer

Keith Henley Sparks
- Born: Keith Henley Sparks; 1936
- Died: 2011 (aged 74–75)
- Occupations: Attraction designer, theme park developer
- Known for: Alton Towers, Prof. Burp's BubbleWorks, The Haunted House

Keith Henley Sparks was a British attraction designer and developer for theme parks around Europe; an early innovator of theme park attractions and dark rides in the United Kingdom (UK). He was known for attractions at Alton Towers, Blackpool Pleasure Beach, the Tussauds Group and The London Dungeon. Notable attractions his studios produced include Prof. Burp's Bubble Works at Chessington World of Adventures, The Haunted House and Around the World in 80 Days at Alton Towers, and Apirama at Meli Park.
