= Tiger Rock =

Flume ride

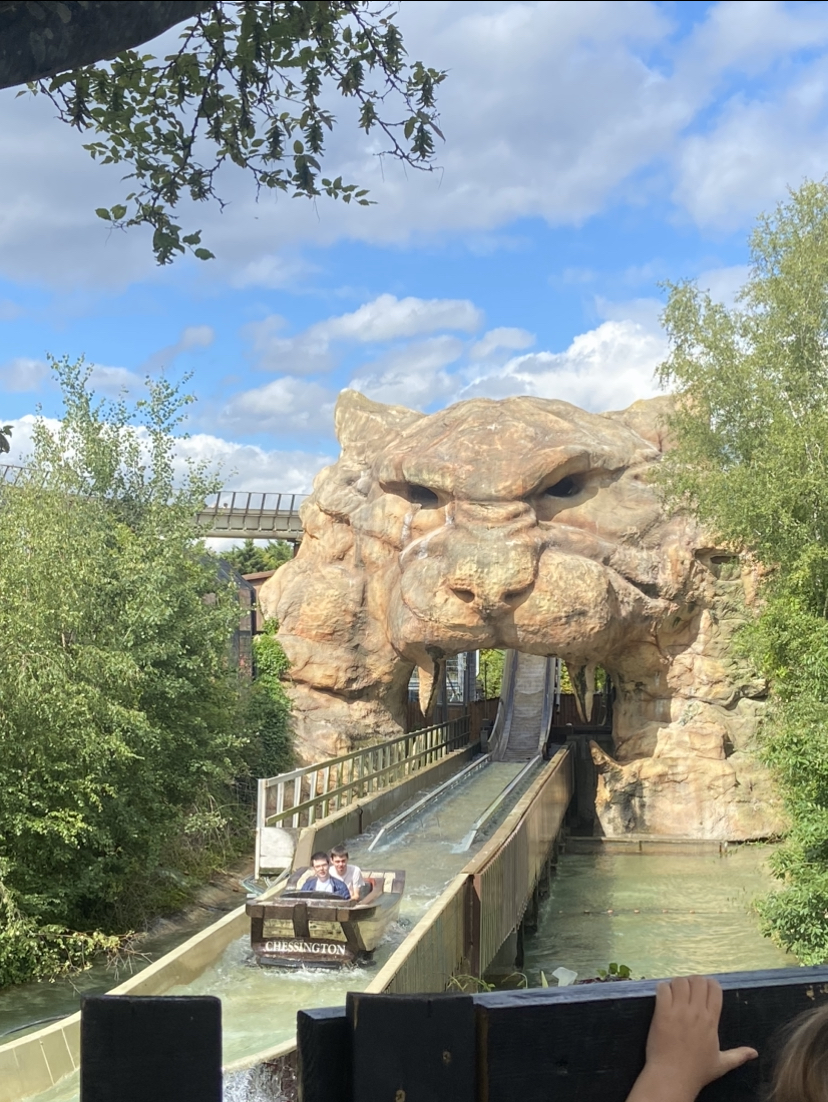

Chessington World of Adventures
- Area: Land of the Tiger
- Coordinates: 51.34842°N 0.320926°W
- Status: Operating
- Cost: £4 million
- Opening date: 7 June 1987

General statistics
- Type: Log flume
- Manufacturer: Mack Rides
- Height: 15 m (49 ft)
- Length: 21 m (69 ft)
- Speed: 26 mph (42 km/h)
- Capacity: 1,500 riders per hour
- Boats: 32 boats. Riders are arranged 5 across in a single row for a total of 5 riders per boat.
- Height restriction: 120 cm (3 ft 11 in)
- Reserve and Ride available
- Wheelchair accessible

Tiger Rock (previously known as Dragon Falls and Dragon River) is a flume ride at the theme park Chessington World of Adventures in Chessington, southwest London, England.

The ride was manufactured by Mack Rides and opened in 1987. It is located in the Land of the Tiger area of the park that was formerly known as Mystic East. The ride was originally extensively themed, although the majority of its scenic design was later removed due to lack of maintenance and durability over time. A contest was held in 2014 that focused on possible new themes for the ride. In September 2017, the ride closed for refurbishment and reemerged on 5 May 2018 as Tiger Rock.

== History ==
The ride was originally named Dragon River and had an Oriental adventure theme when it opened in 1987. The ride was manufactured by Mack Rides and was designed in collaboration with John Wardley. The ride was renamed Dragon Falls in 1999.

In July 2017, Chessington filed for planning permission to undertake a large overhaul of the Mystic East area of the theme park. Part of this overhaul included the re-theming and renaming of Dragon Falls to Tiger Rock. The ride closed on 10 September 2017 so that the overhaul could take place, which involved nearby Peeking Heights, a ferris wheel that was closed permanently the same day. In 2018, Chessington opened Tiger Rock to the public on 5 May 2018. Its theme revolves around tiger imagery and features a large rock tiger head on the second drop, replacing the Angkor Wat heads.

== Ride description ==
Tiger Rock is a water flume ride and features two drops, with the first being smaller than the second. When it was known as Dragon Falls, the station building was designed as a pagoda and the first drop featured a sculpted dragon tunnel. The ride began its journey by passing out of the station, and then along a picturesque stream lined with traditional Japanese plants and trees. Bridges are positioned above the ride at certain points, allowing guests to view passing boats. The boats go up the first lift hill, and then drop down into a tunnel which originally housed a trick waterfall effect.

The boats exit the tunnel into trees, under a bridge, and around a lagoon until reaching a second, taller lift that ascends the side of a rocky mountain. The boats reach their highest point, before dropping into the main splash pool. Prior to the Tiger Rock theme, the boats would pass between two large scenic stone faces resembling Angkor Wat. Right before returning to the station, they would also pass an animatronic elephant that sprayed water at passing riders from its trunk.

== Theme ==
The surrounding area is Oriental themed and features multiple bridges, viewpoints of the flume and a large fibreglass Buddha statue based on the Great Buddha of Kōtoku-in. The original faux-rock mountain with waterfall, which the boats climbed up on the second lift, was demolished in 2005. The boats are themed to resemble wooden canoes with inline seating.

The original Dragon sculpture for the tunnel was created by Aden Hynes Sculpture Studios, along with the two stone Angkor Wat Buddha faces that framed the large flume drop. These sculptures were installed in 1987, having been hand carved from polystyrene, and coated with glass fibre for long time durability outside. Both the dragon and the stone faces were repainted over the years, contributing massively to the rides impressive theming.

The Buddha heads and remaining rock scenery were demolished in 2013, a few years prior to the re-theming of the ride, leaving a bare structure of the flume drop. Half of the dragon tunnel was also removed, meaning boats now travel through exposed back-of-house facilities during the ride. Much of the architectural decoration in the station plaza has also been removed over time. Chessington initially advertised a competition to redesign the ride, claiming the attraction would be rethemed for 2014. However, nothing immediately came of this development, and the ride continued to operate in this half-demolished condition.

The ride closed for a tiger retheme on 10 September 2017. In October 2017, it was announced that the ride would be renamed Tiger Rock. As with Runaway Train, the ride itself will remain unchanged, with only the scenery being redesigned. New Amur tiger enclosures were constructed and built into the area and the 'Mystic East' area of the park was later renamed 'Land of the Tiger'. The parks Ferris Wheel attraction called 'Peeking Heights' was demolished to make way for the new enclosures. The enclosures feature great interactions with the paths, bridges and with the 'Tiger Rock' flume ride in the area and there are also trails in the area where the tigers can walk over the head of guests called 'Tiger Crossings' in a 'Europe First'. A fair bit of the theming of the area has been changed including a few buildings have been repainted to fit in with a new tiger theme, the 'Angkor Wat' structure on the second 'main' drop of the ride has been replaced with a large rock structure centrepiece that the ride drops through that looks like a tiger head. Noticeably, the 'Dragon tunnel' has been repainted and re-purposed to look like a rocky cave structure, with the rough shape of the dragon being recognizable, but the artwork replaced with a flat blanket of grey rock texture. Notably, the large Buddha statue themed to Kōtoku-in in the city of Kamakura in Japan has survived the re-theme.
