= SW8 =

SW8 can refer to:

- EMD SW8
- (16453) 1989 SW8
- Star Wars: The Last Jedi, also known as Star Wars Episode VIII
- SW8 (roller coaster), a roller coaster at Alton Towers in Staffordshire, England.
- Renjong LRT station, Singapore

== See also ==
- SW postcode area
