= Bubbleworks =

Dark water ride at Chessington World of Adventures

Coordinates: 51°20′51″N 0°18′56″W

- Original Bubble Works logo 1990–2005

Chessington World of Adventures
- Area: Transylvania
- Status: Closed
- Opening date: 1990 (As Prof. Burp's Bubble Works); 2006 (As Imperial Leather Bubbleworks)
- Closing date: 6 September 2016; 10 years ago
- Replaced by: The Gruffalo River Ride Adventure

Ride statistics
- Attraction type: Dark ride
- Manufacturer: Leisurtec / WGH
- Designer: Sparks Group (1990); Tussauds Studios (2006)
- Theme: Factory
- Music: Graham Smart
- Capacity: 1,000 riders per hour
- Vehicle type: Tubs
- Vehicles: 28
- Riders per vehicle: 4
- Duration: 6 minutes
- Fastrack available
- Must transfer from wheelchair
- Assistive listening available

Bubbleworks (originally named Prof. Burp's Bubble Works and later Imperial Leather Bubbleworks from 2006) was a dark water ride located at Chessington World of Adventures Resort in Greater London, England. Opening in 1990 the attraction took riders through animated scenes of a comical factory producing fizzy pop. The original ride closed to be redesigned in 2006 with a sponsorship by Imperial Leather toiletries which resulted in the majority of the animations being removed. This version of the ride operated until September 2016 when it closed permanently to be rethemed to The Gruffalo River Ride Adventure.

== History ==
=== Prof. Burp's Bubble Works ===
The original Prof. Burp's Bubble Works station.

The Transylvania area at Chessington World of Adventures was created in 1990, opening with the Vampire and Prof. Burp's Bubble Works as its main attractions. The area was created as part of the continued expansion of the theme park, following the initial redevelopment of the former Chessington Zoo in 1987.

Park developer John Wardley brought the concept of a magical factory run by Professor Burp, with riders following the making of fizzy pop from juicing to bottling. From this, Keith Sparks' production company Sparks Creative designed and built the entire attraction. The musical soundtrack was produced by composer Graham Smart.

The dark ride went on to be highly successful for the park. Wardley has since claimed that it was often named third best dark ride in the world by the National Amusement Park Historical Association and later reflected on the attraction as being his "proudest moment at Chessington".

Riders had the option to exit into a gift shop, originally selling Bubbleworks souvenirs including Professor Burp-branded drinks. In later years, the ride's exit path was permanently routed through the gift shop.

=== 2006 Refurbishment ===
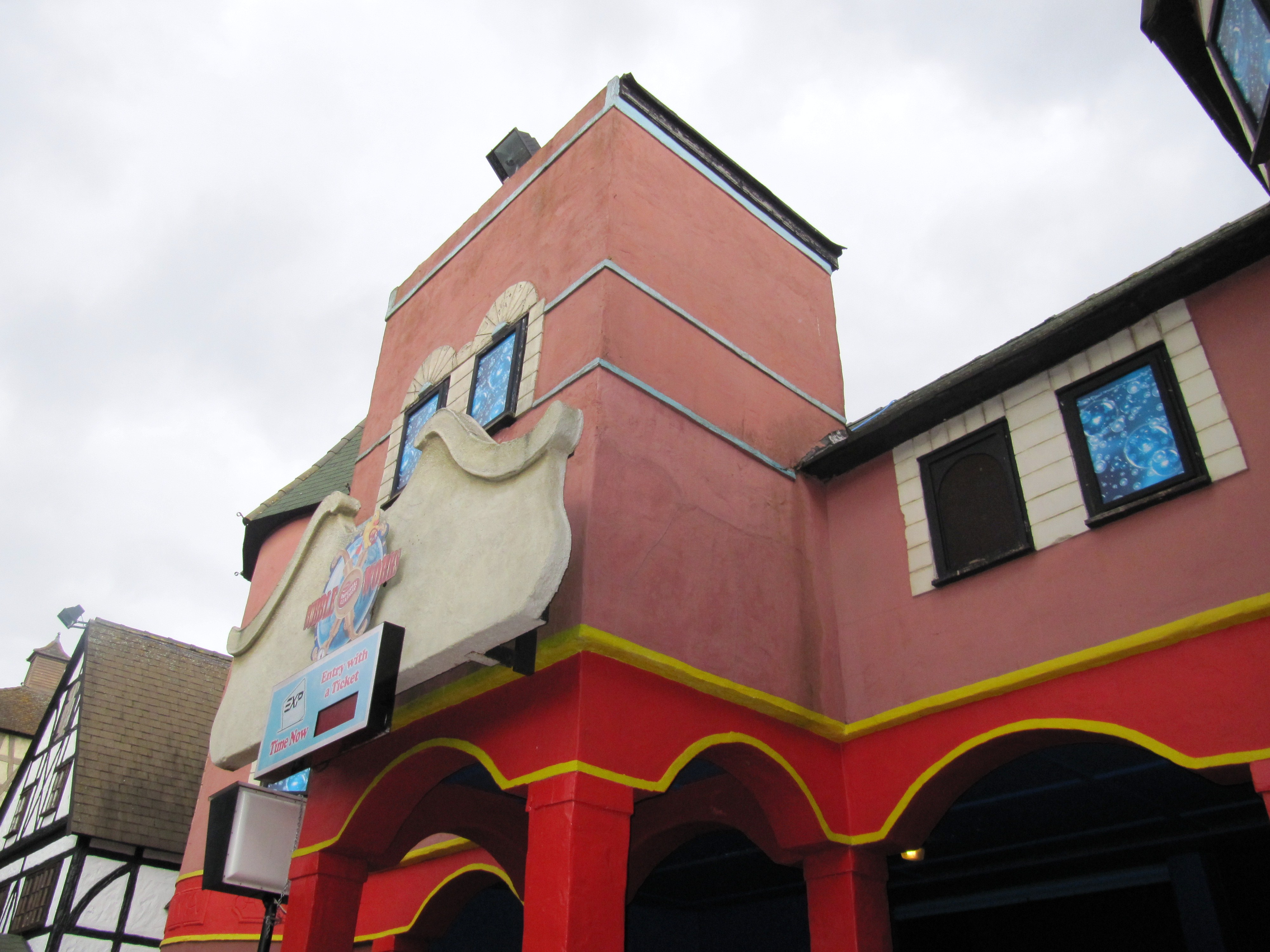
Exterior of the Imperial Leather Bubbleworks, as it appeared following the attraction's redesign in 2006.

Prof. Burp's BubbleWorks operated for fifteen years until being replaced a new sponsored version at the end of 2005, produced by Tussauds Studios. The ride's theme was changed to a soap factory to suit the new sponsor Imperial Leather. Several of the sets and props were recycled, extensively modified and repainted. Additionally, almost all the animations were removed or made static.

"The Bubble Works, I think probably that was one of the happiest experiences I had. It had, and has still got, a huge following - even though it in effect closed [in 2005]. [...] And it was very sad when the ownership of the park changed that it was decided that the Bubbleworks had to be made more commercial, and a sponsor was brought in, and the storyline was reworked to suit the brand of the sponsor."

— John Wardley reflecting in 2010 on Prof. Burp's BubbleWorks and its 2005 closure.

Upon re-opening, the redesigned attraction received highly negative response for having removed the animations and humour of the ride and for the flawed alterations to its soundtrack, lighting and animations (including dubbing over most of the original theme music with quacking sounds). It was noted that the new Bubbleworks was largely a "monotonous... charmless and, at best, highly irritating" advert for its sponsor.

The original ride's producer, John Wardley, refused to ride the new version, having been warned that he "would weep if [he] did".

In 2014, the Imperial Leather brand logos were removed or covered up, although the ride remained unchanged otherwise. On 21 December 2013, a fire broke out at the adjacent Creaky Cafe building, which damaged an exterior wall to the finale room, requiring repairs. During this time the ride's facade was repainted in blue.

=== Closure ===
In the summer of 2016, Chessington announced that the ride would close that September to make way for a new dark ride developed by Merlin Magic Making. The park later confirmed that the replacement would be based on the Gruffalo franchise and was scheduled to open in 2017. This announcement drew a highly mixed reaction across social media platforms.

Press coverage erroneously claimed that Prof. Burp’s Bubble Works had been operating continuously for 26 years. The ride officially shut down on 6 September with many of its remaining props sold at auction.

During the ride's final month of operation, Chessington offered the public paid VIP Behind The Scenes tours led by an actor imitating Professor Burp. However, the tours were noted for containing several factual inaccuracies regarding the original attraction, such as the claim that the Bubblehead characters were named "Willyheads". This same misinformation was also featured on notice boards during the official media party held for the ride's closure.

By the time of its closure, the ride had completed more than 15 million circuits since its opening day and had carried 32 million passengers.
