= Duel – The Haunted House Strikes Back! =

Ghost train dark ride

Coordinates: 52.98897°N 1.884314°W

Alton Towers Resort
- Area: Gloomy Wood
- Status: Removed
- Opening date: 2003
- Closing date: 2022
- Replaced: The Haunted House
- Replaced by: The Curse at Alton Manor

Ride statistics
- Attraction type: Dark ride, haunted attraction
- Manufacturer: Mack Rides
- Designer: Tussauds Studios
- Theme: Zombie
- Capacity: 1,920 riders per hour
- Vehicle type: Car
- Vehicles: 35
- Riders per vehicle: 5
- Rows: 2
- Duration: 6 minutes 15 seconds
- Must transfer from wheelchair

Duel — The Haunted House Strikes Back! was a dark ride at the Alton Towers theme park near the village of Alton in Staffordshire, England, opened in 2003. The ride took guests around a haunted house that was home to zombies, with guests shooting targets with laser blasters. There was a minimum height restriction of 0.9 metres with guests under 1.1 metres accompanied by an adult.

It originally opened as The Haunted House in 1992, before receiving a retheme and adding the laser shooting game. In September 2022, the ride closed to be redesigned as The Curse at Alton Manor.

== History ==
By 2002, much of the original Haunted House had been altered. The park decided to revamp the attraction as an interactive dark ride with the addition of laser guns. Each target hit by a rider would add to their individual score shown on a display in each car. Towards the end of the 2002 season, a poster was placed outside advertising the new name and opening date, announcing: "Whatever you do, don't miss! Duel - The Haunted House Strikes Back!".

A new soundtrack produced by David Buckley played throughout the ride, replacing the original zoned tracks. Other changes to the ride included replacing many characters with zombies. To make room for the laser guns, one seat in the back row of each ride vehicle was removed, reducing the capacity of each vehicle to five. The revamped ride reopened in April 2003.

For the 2008 and 2009 Halloween 'Scarefest' event, the ride opened as "Duel: Live!" featuring several live actors around the ride. In 2008, Duel ran as normal during the morning and afternoon before becoming to Duel Live after 3:00PM, but ran all day in 2009. In 2010, the overlay was renamed "Skelvin's Haunted Adventure", themed to the park's Halloween mascot 'Skelvin', and the ride soundtrack was replaced by the Beetlejuice title music.
