= The Flume (Alton Towers) =

Removed log flume water ride

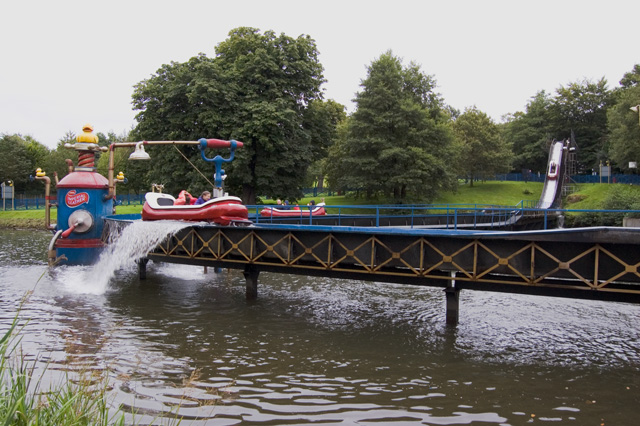

Alton Towers
- Area: Mutiny Bay
- Coordinates: 52.988995°N 1.888847°W
- Status: Removed
- Opening date: 1981
- Closing date: 10 October 2015
- Replaced by: Wicker Man

General statistics
- Type: Log flume
- Manufacturer: Mack Rides
- Height: 27 m (89 ft)
- Drop: 26 m (85 ft)
- Length: 886 m (2,907 ft)
- Speed: 45 km/h (28 mph)
- Capacity: 1,400 riders per hour
- Duration: 6 minutes
- Vehicle type: Boat
- Boats: 35 boats. Riders are arranged 1 across in 5 rows for a total of 5 riders per boat.
- Height restriction: 90 cm (2 ft 11 in)
- Site area: 5 1/2 acres
- Must transfer from wheelchair

The Flume was a Log Flume at Alton Towers in Staffordshire. It opened in 1981 and was rethemed in 2004 coinciding with its sponsorship by Imperial Leather. The ride was a bath time themed log flume with three drops. It was the longest log flume attraction in the world at the time of opening. The attraction closed in 2015 and was replaced by the Wicker Man rollercoaster.

== Ride experience ==
The ride lasted approximately six minutes and began with passengers boarding boats with a maximum capacity of five. Boarding took place in a moving, circular station. After dispatch, the boats navigated several turns through woodland before ascending the first lift hill. This was followed by a small drop, leaving the trough elevated as the boat continued winding through the tree canopies. The ride then reached the second lift hill, enclosed within a darkened hut, followed by a “blind” drop in darkness.

Following the sponsorship by Imperial Leather, riders were greeted with themed elements, including a shower sprinkler and a giant rubber duck statue. The boats then traveled through additional woodland before ascending an 86-foot lift hill, which was immediately followed by a swift 85-foot drop, usually soaking riders. The ride concluded with the boats passing through two more shower sprinklers before returning to the station.

== History ==
In 1980, Alton Towers opened the ride Corkscrew along with a few other amusement attractions. Alton Towers gained popularity so for the 1981 season they decided to open a log flume. Construction started in late 1980 to open the ride for the 1981 season. It was the park's first major ride engineering project including building the lake reservoir in a former field. The 5.5-acre site was bordered on two sides by the park miniature railway. Initially access to the new ride was via a railway bridge over the tracks, but by 1982 the railway had been shortened to allow easier access for the popular new ride.

In 1981, the 'White Water Flume' opened to the public as the world's longest log flume with its 2,600-foot (790-metre) waterway themed around the Canadian Falls; by 1983 the ride had acquired its traditional and more popular name of 'The Log Flume' and for the next 23 years operated as such. Between 1984 and 1995 it also featured props from 'Dinosaur Land' which had been closed the previous season to make way for The Black Hole, including a prehistoric family inside the tunnel section of the flume.

In 2003, Alton Towers approached WGH Transportation Ltd to supply new boats for the new 2004 season, and the ride was going to the rethemed and renamed to 'The Flume' with a bath theme, as sponsored by the soap manufacturer, Imperial Leather. Stuart:Pease of Rotherham was the contractor used to produce 35 new 'bath' boats replacing the logs for a cost of £282,580. A new lining, maintenance, a refurbished station, a yellow duck, shower and other bath-time theming was introduced for the new theming. In 2008, the area in which the ride operated was re-themed to Mutiny Bay, however the ride retained its bath time theme.

Weeks before the beginning of the 2016 season, Alton Towers announced that the ride was to be closed permanently. On 16 March 2016, the park posted a photo through their Towers Loving Care Twitter page of a sign on the perimeter of the former area of the attraction that reads "SW8. Ground breaking new ride development", marking the construction site for the resort's next large investment SW8.

Following the ride’s closure and during the construction of the Wicker Man, the resort held charity auctions featuring items salvaged from The Flume. These included queue line and warning signage, as well as the ride’s boats.

== Media gallery ==
Route of The Flume
