= The Gruffalo River Ride Adventure =

Dark water ride at Chessington World of Adventures

Coordinates: 51°20′51″N 0°18′56″W

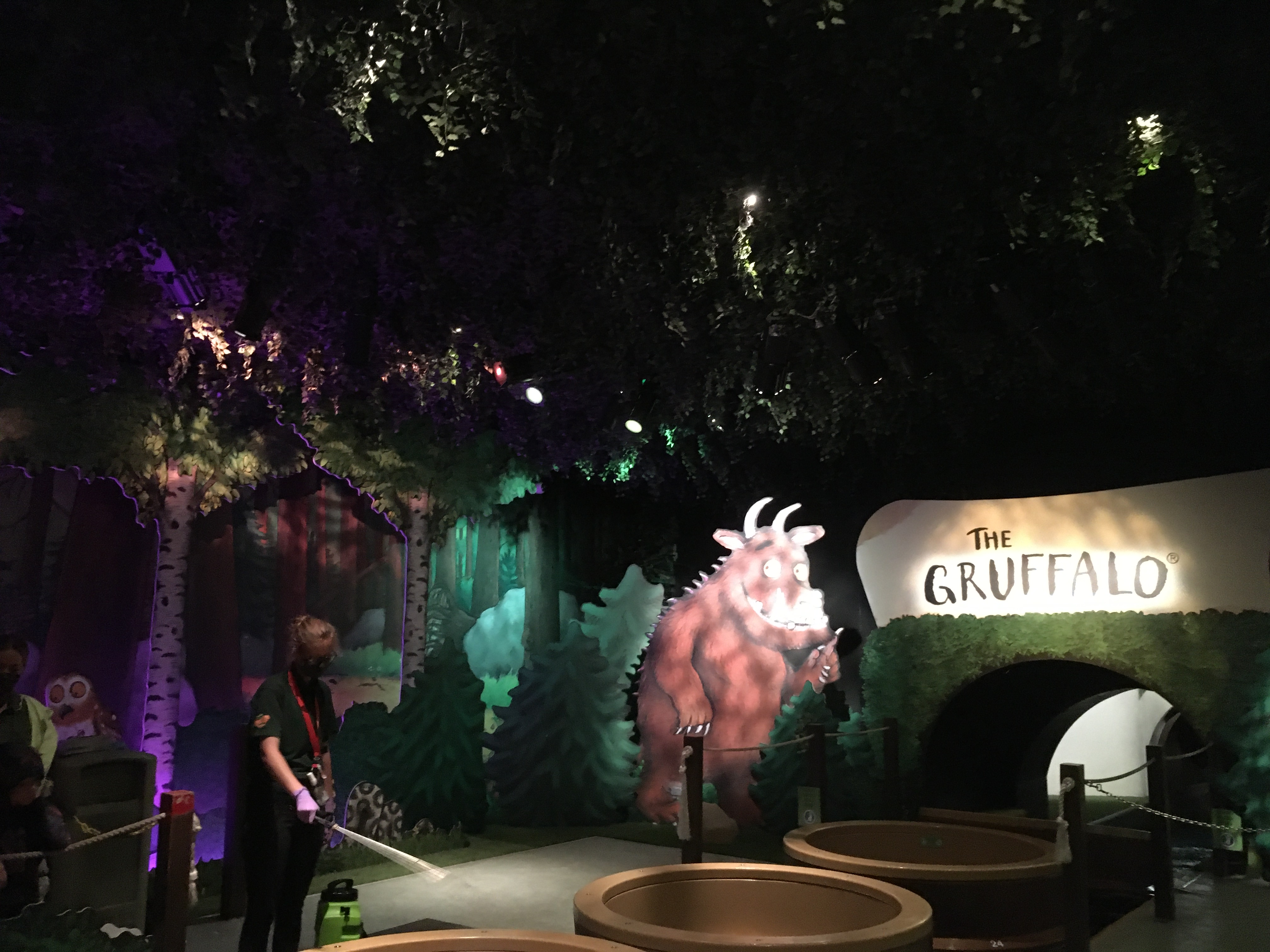
- Ride interior in 2020

Chessington World of Adventures
- Area: Wild Woods
- Status: Operating
- Opening date: 18 March 2017
- Replaced: Bubbleworks

Ride statistics
- Attraction type: Dark ride
- Manufacturer: Leisure Tech / WGH - (Lifts replaced by Garmendale)
- Designer: Merlin Magic Making
- Theme: The Gruffalo
- Capacity: 1,000 riders per hour
- Vehicle type: Tubs
- Vehicles: 28
- Riders per vehicle: 4
- Duration: 6 minutes
- Reserve and Ride available
- Wheelchair accessible
- Must transfer from wheelchair
- Assistive listening available

The Gruffalo River Ride Adventure (previously known as Bubbleworks) is a dark water ride that opened in March 2017 at Chessington World of Adventures Resort in Greater London, England, developed by Merlin Entertainments.

The attraction is a retheme of the former Bubbleworks, utilising the original ride layout and boats.

It takes riders through scenes based on The Gruffalo franchise. The various scenes the boats travel though feature a combination of physical set pieces and digital projections, with the latter incorporating clips from the 2009 animated film The Gruffalo.

== Ride experience ==
Guests enter a station designed to evoke a forest atmosphere, with suspended leaves adorning the ceiling and vibrant murals on the walls that reflect the theme of the woodland. Boats travel through the center of the station on a continuous conveyor belt, allowing guests to embark by stepping into the boats. The boats are not equipped with restraints, providing a more open and immersive experience.

Upon departure from the station, the boats journey through the attraction along a flowing trough, passing through a series of scenes that bring the Gruffalo story to life. These scenes are enhanced by a combination of screens, ambient lighting, projections, smoke effects, and physical set pieces, all of which work together to create an engaging narrative experience.

The ride features a small drop approximately two-thirds of the way through. The boats ascend to an unspecified height before gently descending along a shallow ramp, leading into the final section of the experience.

In its conclusion, the ride preserves two of the smaller fountain sets from its predecessor, maintaining familiar elements while incorporating new visual and sensory enhancements. These fountains create a dramatic arch over the trough, with boats passing through and beneath the water effects.

An on-ride photo is taken as the boat drops down a ramp into the final scene.

== History ==
The original Prof. Burp's BubbleWorks ride operated for fifteen years, before being redesigned for a sponsorship deal at the end of 2005, without the involvement of the ride's original designers. During this refurbishment, the ride's factory theme was changed to suit the new sponsor Imperial Leather, with most of the animations and effects removed. By 2014, the Imperial Leather sponsorship had expired and so the brand logos were removed, but the ride remained in a poor condition. On 6 September 2016, the ride closed and the remaining props were auctioned off.

On 1 January 2017, Chessington announced that The Gruffalo River Ride Adventure would replace Bubbleworks. The new ride was produced by Merlin Magic Making and officially opened on 18 March 2017, with the surrounding Transylvania area renamed 'Wild Woods'.

The Gruffalo River Ride Adventure features far fewer animations, props and scenic detail than the original Prof. Burp's Bubble Works, instead employing TV screens and projected images onto whited-out sets, with the remaining spaces shrouded in darkness. Since the building was built to accommodate the original larger and more detailed scenes from Prof. Burp's Bubble Works, most of the Gruffalo sets were simply built in front of the old scenes. However, smell pods were added to give a better effect on the forest at one point which was received well.

Chessington World of Adventures celebrated the 25th anniversary of The Gruffalo in July 2024 with a series of themed attractions and events. These included a meet-and-greet experience featuring characters from the story, a children’s activity trail, and the Gruffalo River Ride Adventure.
