= Galactica (roller coaster) =

Flying coaster at Alton Towers

- Previously known as Air (2002–2015)

Alton Towers
- Location: Alton Towers
- Park section: Forbidden Valley
- Coordinates: 52.9859°N 1.88205°W
- Status: Operating
- Opening date: 16 March 2002 (as Air); 24 March 2016 (as Galactica)
- Closing date: 8 November 2015 (as Air)
- Cost: £12 million

General statistics
- Type: Steel – Flying
- Manufacturer: Bolliger & Mabillard
- Model: Flying Coaster
- Track layout: Terrain
- Lift/launch system: Chain lift hill
- Height: 20 m (66 ft)
- Length: 840 m (2,760 ft)
- Speed: 75 km/h (47 mph)
- Inversions: 2
- Duration: 1:40
- Capacity: 1,500 riders per hour
- G-force: 3.5
- Height restriction: 140 cm (4 ft 7 in)
- Trains: 3 trains with 7 cars; riders arranged 4 across in a single row for a total of 28 riders per train
- Fastrack available
- Single rider line available
- Galactica at RCDB

Galactica is a flying roller coaster located in the Forbidden Valley area of Alton Towers amusement park in Staffordshire, England. It originally opened as Air on 16 March 2002 and is the first flying coaster manufactured by Bolliger & Mabillard. Guests ride in a prone position, meant to produce the feeling of flight, as the train passes close to the ground, under footpaths, and narrowly past trees and rocks. The ride was refurbished for the 2016 season and reopened as Galactica. It features an 840-metre-long (920 yd) track and reaches a maximum speed of 75 km/h (47 mph; 21 m/s).

== History ==
=== Air (2002–2015) ===
According to Tussauds park developer John Wardley, a prototype flying coaster from B&M had been proposed to open at Alton Towers for 1998, but was delayed due to its protracted technical development. A press release from Alton Towers also claimed that the idea for a flying coaster was first considered as far back as 1990, when Tussauds acquired the park. The project name for the ride's development was Secret Weapon 5 (SW5), following the park's project naming convention for previous major coaster developments.

Construction of Air began in mid-2001. Later that year, Alton Towers initially advertised the new rollercoaster as a "next generation Aerial Inversion Ride"; subsequently revealing the name Air. In early 2002, the ride began testing. Alton Towers marketed the roller coaster as the world's first Flying roller coaster. However, in 1997 Granada Studios built the single-person roller coaster Skytrak, which was the first true flying roller coaster in the world.

At the time of opening, Air tied with Oblivion as the most expensive ride at Alton Towers, at a cost of £12 million. A £4.5 million marketing campaign for the ride included commercials based around the ride's slogan, "assume the position". Air officially opened to the public on 16 March 2002. On opening, Alton Towers entered into a five-year sponsorship agreement for the ride with Cadbury Heroes.

=== Galactica (2016–present) ===
In June 2015, the park submitted a planning application to make modifications to the station building and retail space. This proposed adding a new photo opportunity into the queue, enclosing the station building with new walls, and constructing additional theming elements around the ride area. This was in addition to an earlier planning application to convert the existing ride shop into a restaurant. In October 2015, the first promotional material was posted on the Alton Towers website, advising guests to "prepare for a new flight" and to "watch this space".

On 12 January 2016, Alton Towers announced that Air would be re-themed as Galactica for the 2016 season and would include on-ride virtual reality (VR) headsets simulating a ride through the cosmos. The announcement was made at an event held at the Science Museum. Each seat on the roller coaster was initially fitted with a Samsung Gear VR headset and pouch. The virtual reality experience was optional, as guests could choose to ride without using the headsets. A promotional website was also released explaining more information about the ride and its new storyline. In late February 2016, the park announced that the official opening date would be 24 March 2016.

For the 2018 season, the availability of VR headsets on the ride were reduced to the back three rows of each train only, with guests choosing whether to use the VR or not when they entered the station. In 2019, Alton Towers removed the virtual reality headsets altogether due to guest feedback.

== Characteristics ==
=== Statistics ===
At the time of opening, Galactica was the tallest ride at Alton Towers with a height of 20 metres (66 ft). until it was overtaken by Wicker Man, which stands at 22 metres (72 ft). The 840-metre-long (2,760-foot) ride reaches a top speed of 75 kilometres per hour (47 miles per hour), and riders can experience a g-force of up to 3.5g whilst on the ride. One cycle of the ride lasts approximately one minute and forty seconds.

=== Trains ===
Galactica features three trains. Each train has seven cars, with each car carrying four riders side-by-side in a single row. This configuration allows for up to 1500 riders per hour, although this was heavily reduced when VR was in operation.

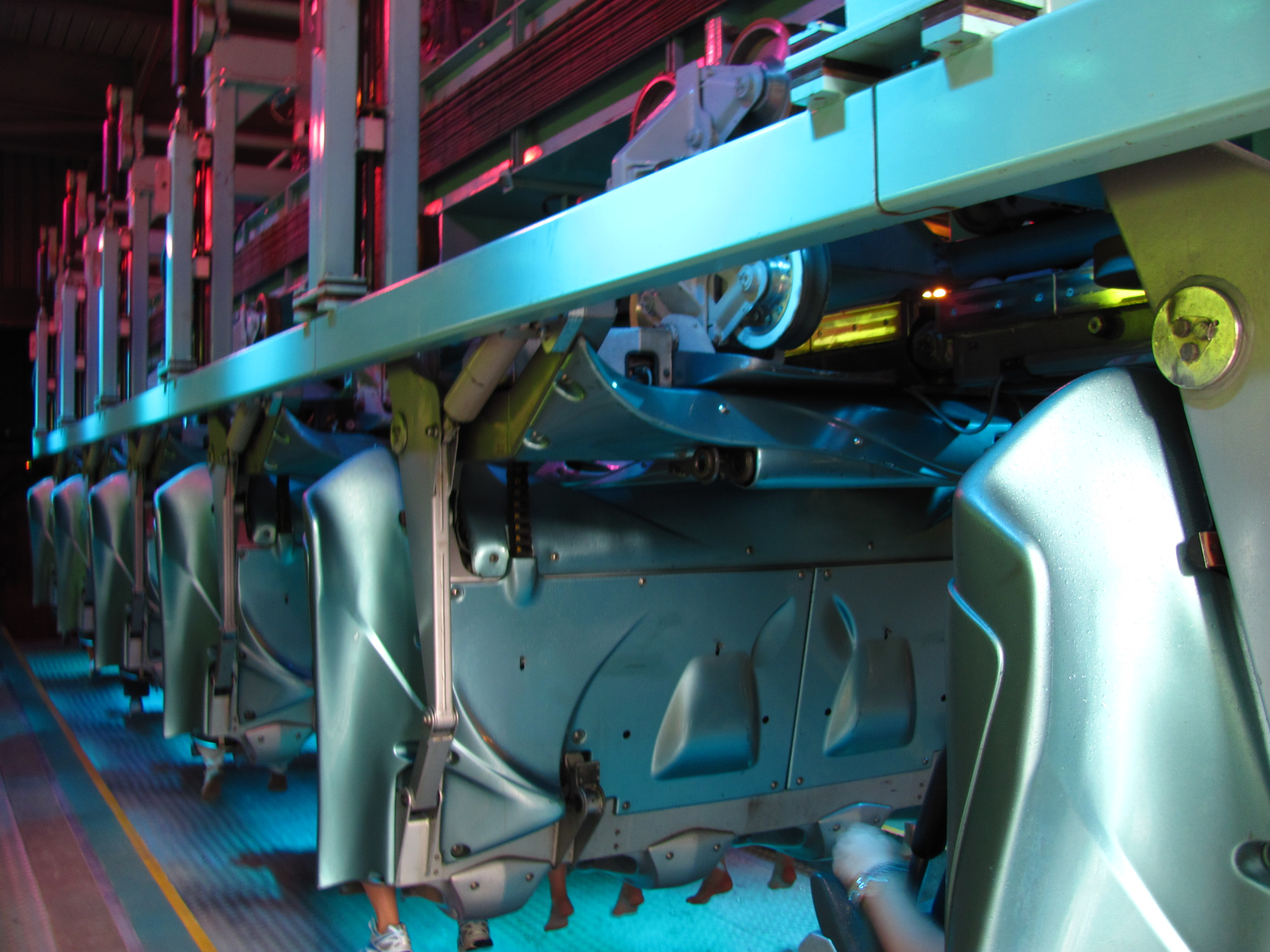
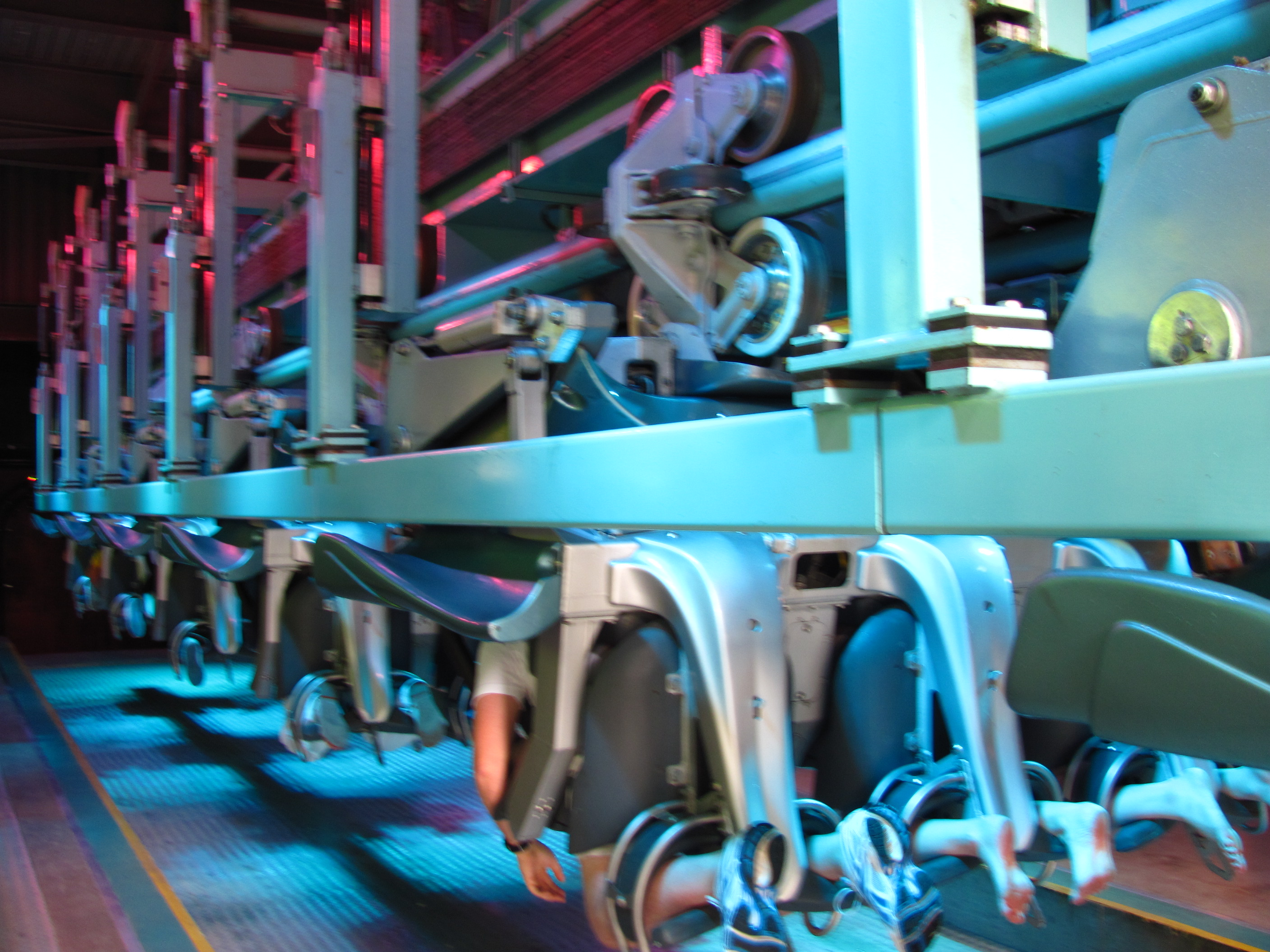
A train in the loading position (left) and flying position (right)

=== Station and loading ===
Riders board a train sitting down, in a similar style to inverted roller coasters. Riders are restrained through a padded over-the-shoulder harness and a lap bar. Two flaps hold the riders' legs in position at their ankles, and close as the harness locks into place. After a train is fully locked and checked, riders are raised into the flying position and the train departs the station. When the ride operated as Air, a dispatch sequence involved lighting changes and an audio saying "Prepare for Air, assume the position, now fly". The ride has a dual-loading system in the station, allowing two trains to be simultaneously boarded for more efficient loading. However, this system is typically only used on busier days, meaning often only one station is used. From 2016 to 2018, riders had the option of wearing virtual reality headsets, which were attached to the restraints.

=== Ride layout ===
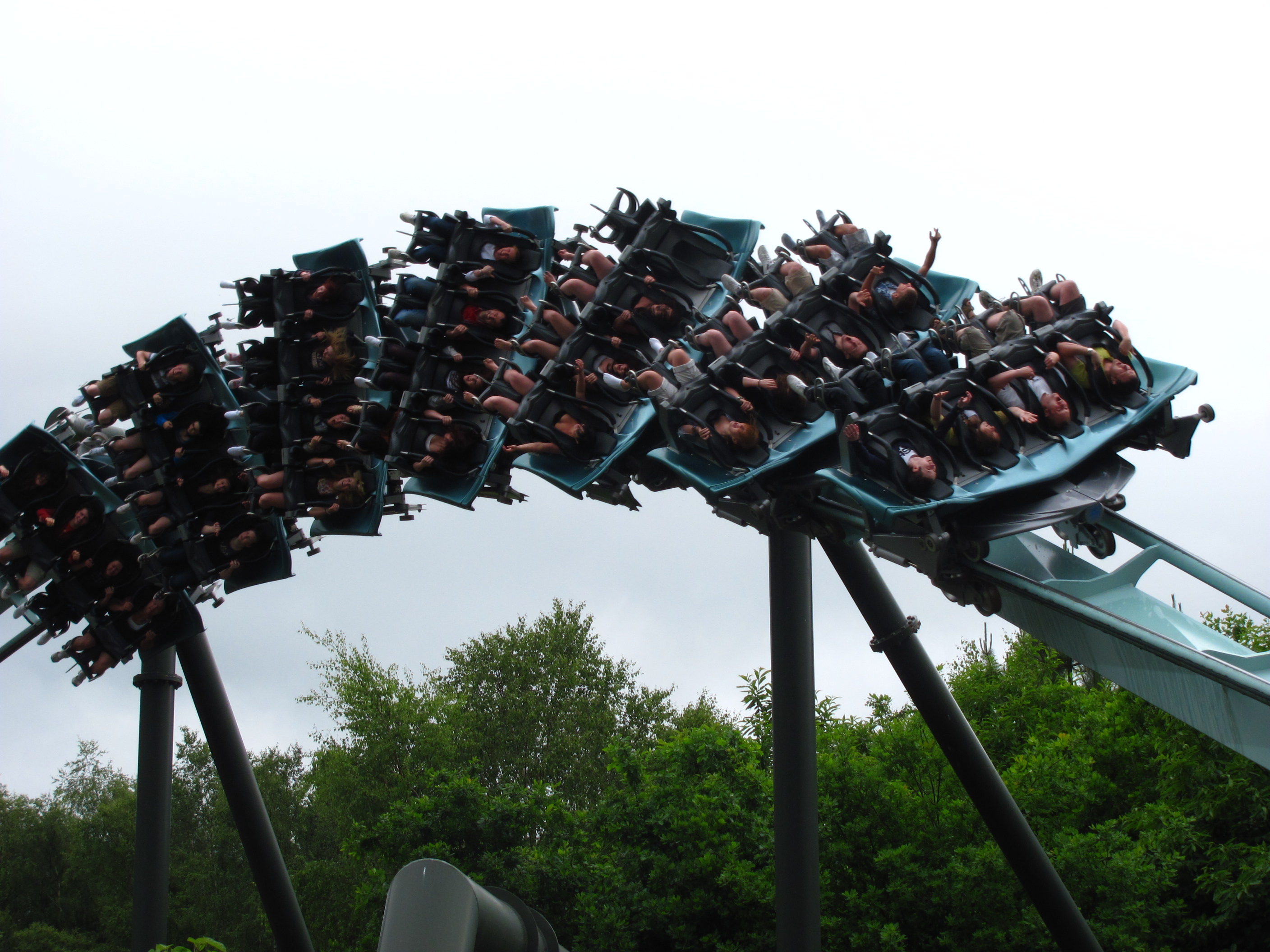
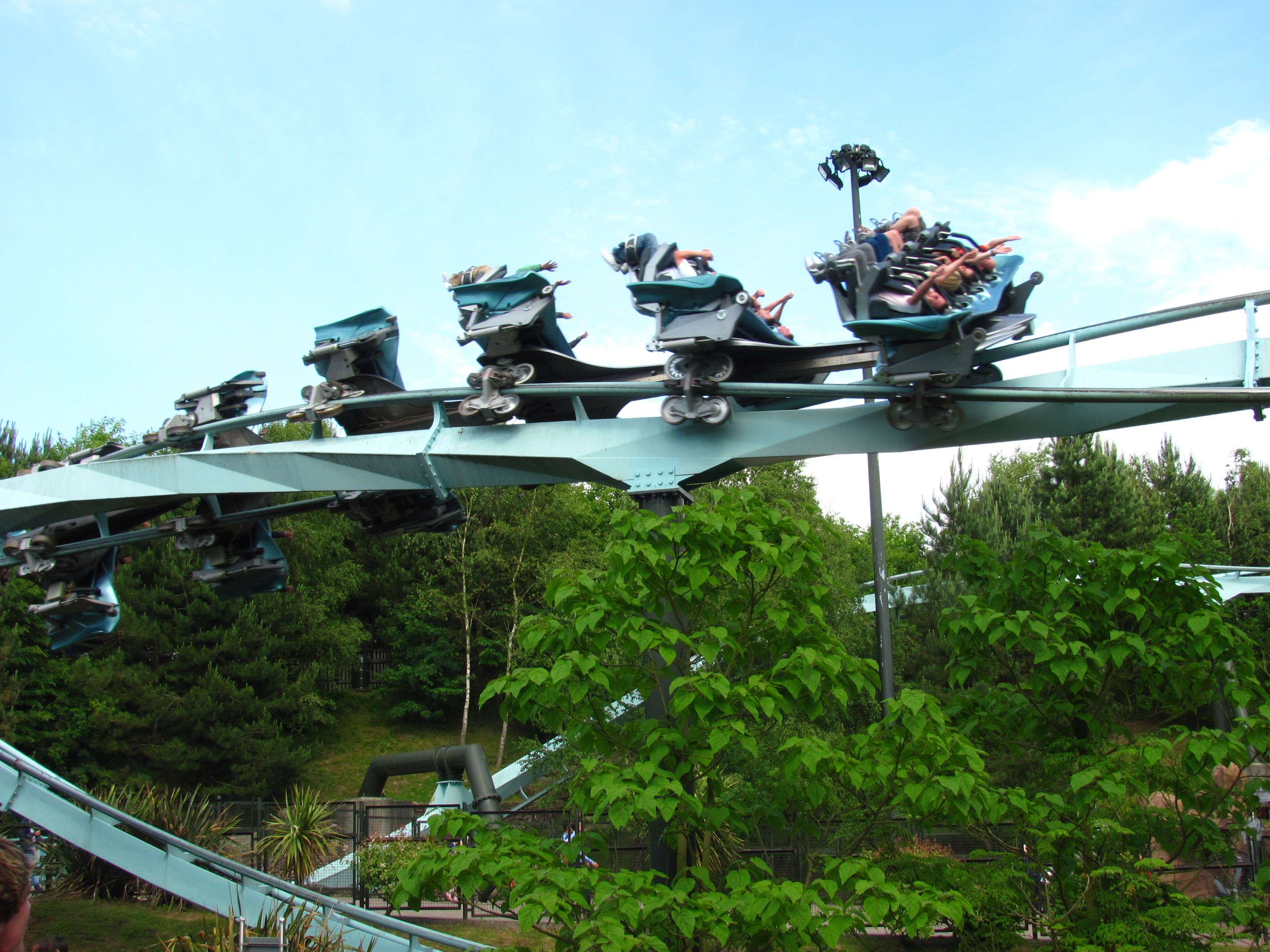
Trains navigating the fly-to-lie (left) and inline twist (right) elements.

Galactica departs the station and ascends a chain lift hill. The train enters the first drop, dips to the right, and rises back up through the ride's centrepiece theming element – a portal – which correlates to the ride's space theme. Immediately following this, the track twists, turning riders from the prone position onto their backs. The train then embarks on a large upward left turn before twisting again, returning riders to the prone position. After exiting from this lie-to-fly element, the train passes underneath a small ravine before pitching up into a tight turn over the plaza area. A 360-degree inline twist is followed by a series of smaller turns and dips in the track, before coming to a stop on the brake run and returning to one of the ride's two stations.

== Reception ==
The Tussauds Group, then owners of Alton Towers in the early 2000s, claimed that Air contributed to the park's strong performance in 2002 and 2003.

In Amusement Today's annual Golden Ticket Awards, Air was ranked in the top 50 among steel roller coasters numerous times following its opening. It peaked at position 24 in 2003, before dropping to 34 in 2004 and 36 in 2005. In 2006, it tied ranked 49th with another Bolliger & Mabillard flying coaster, Superman: Ultimate Flight. The ride would drop out of the annual rankings the following year, although it would make a brief reappearance as Galactica in 2015 when it ranked 38th.
