= The Curse at Alton Manor =

Ghost train dark ride

Coordinates: 52.98897°N 1.884314°W

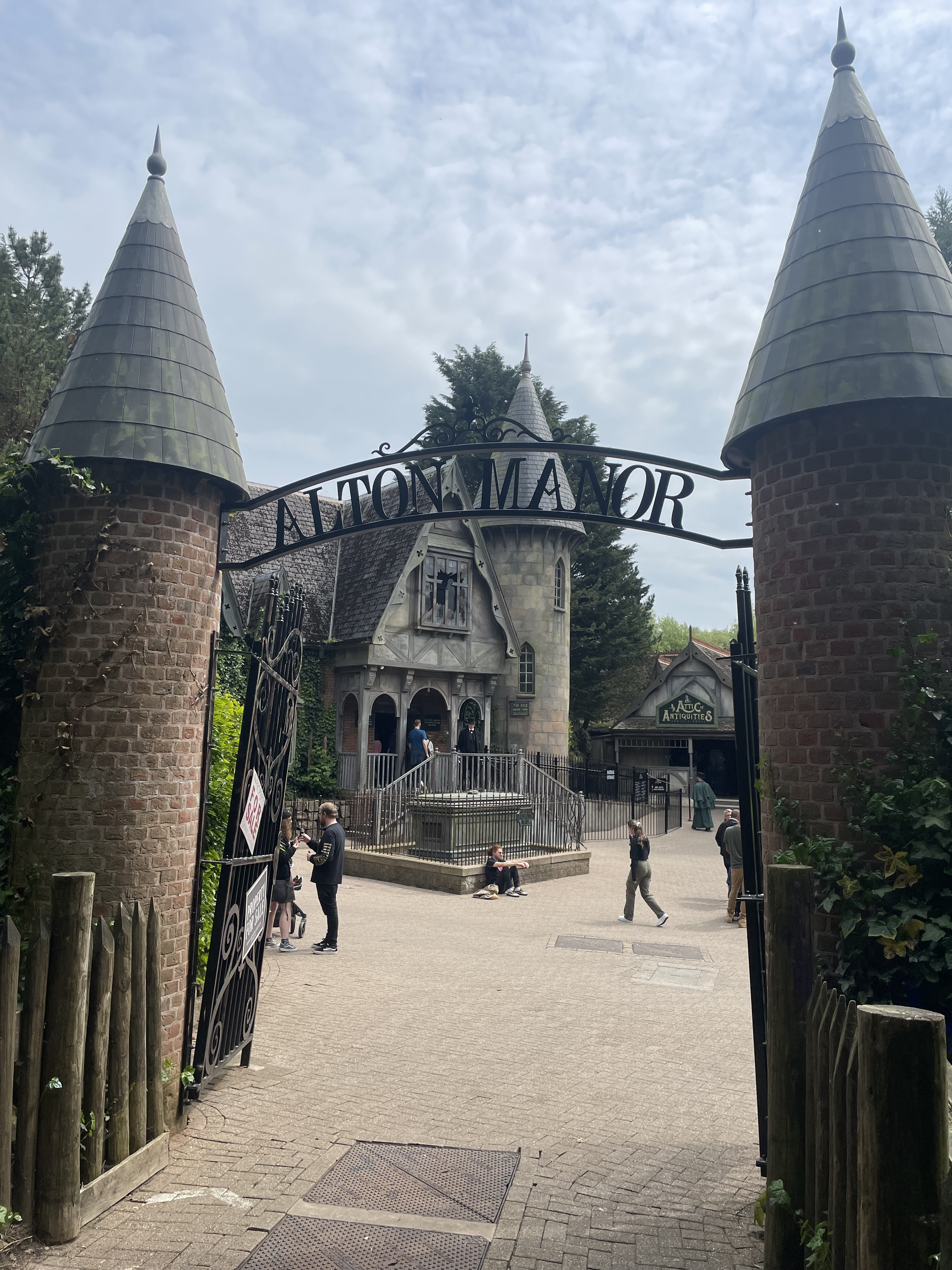
- The entrance sign for The Curse at Alton Manor

Alton Towers Resort
- Area: Gloomy Wood
- Status: Operating
- Opening date: 18 March 2023
- Replaced: Duel – The Haunted House Strikes Back!

Ride statistics
- Attraction type: Dark ride, haunted attraction
- Manufacturer: Mack Rides
- Designer: Merlin Magic Making
- Theme: Haunted
- Capacity: 1,920 riders per hour
- Vehicle type: Car
- Vehicles: 35
- Riders per vehicle: 6
- Rows: 2
- Riders per row: 3
- Duration: 6 minutes 15 seconds
- Fastrack, Ride Access Pass available
- Must transfer from wheelchair
- Assistive listening available

The Curse at Alton Manor is a dark ride located at the Alton Towers theme park, near the village of Alton, Staffordshire, England. The attraction opened on 18 March 2023. Guests must be at least 0.9 metres tall to ride, and those under 1.1 metres in height are required to be accompanied by an adult.

The ride originally opened in 1992 as The Haunted House, before a retheme as Duel – The Haunted House Strikes Back! with the addition of interactive laser shooting in 2003. The ride system and building were reused for The Curse at Alton Manor, featuring a completely new theme and scenes. However, the interactive laser element from the previous attraction was removed.

== Development ==
After an initial teaser, Duel closed on 6 September 2022 and its replacement was announced as The Curse at Alton Manor the following January. Later details revealed that the ride's new premise would revolve around a character named Emily Alton, based on the little Victorian ghost girl that inhabited a dollhouse in the queue area of both the Haunted House and Duel. A main theme of the ride is that her spirit seeks revenge for being left alone and neglected in the house. The ride and surrounding grounds include several easter eggs, such as gravestones memorialising former Alton Towers rides.

As part of the renovation, the laser guns and targets were removed and the ride vehicles restored to six seats. The attraction officially opened to the public on 18 March 2023.
