= Wicker Man (roller coaster) =

Wooden roller coaster

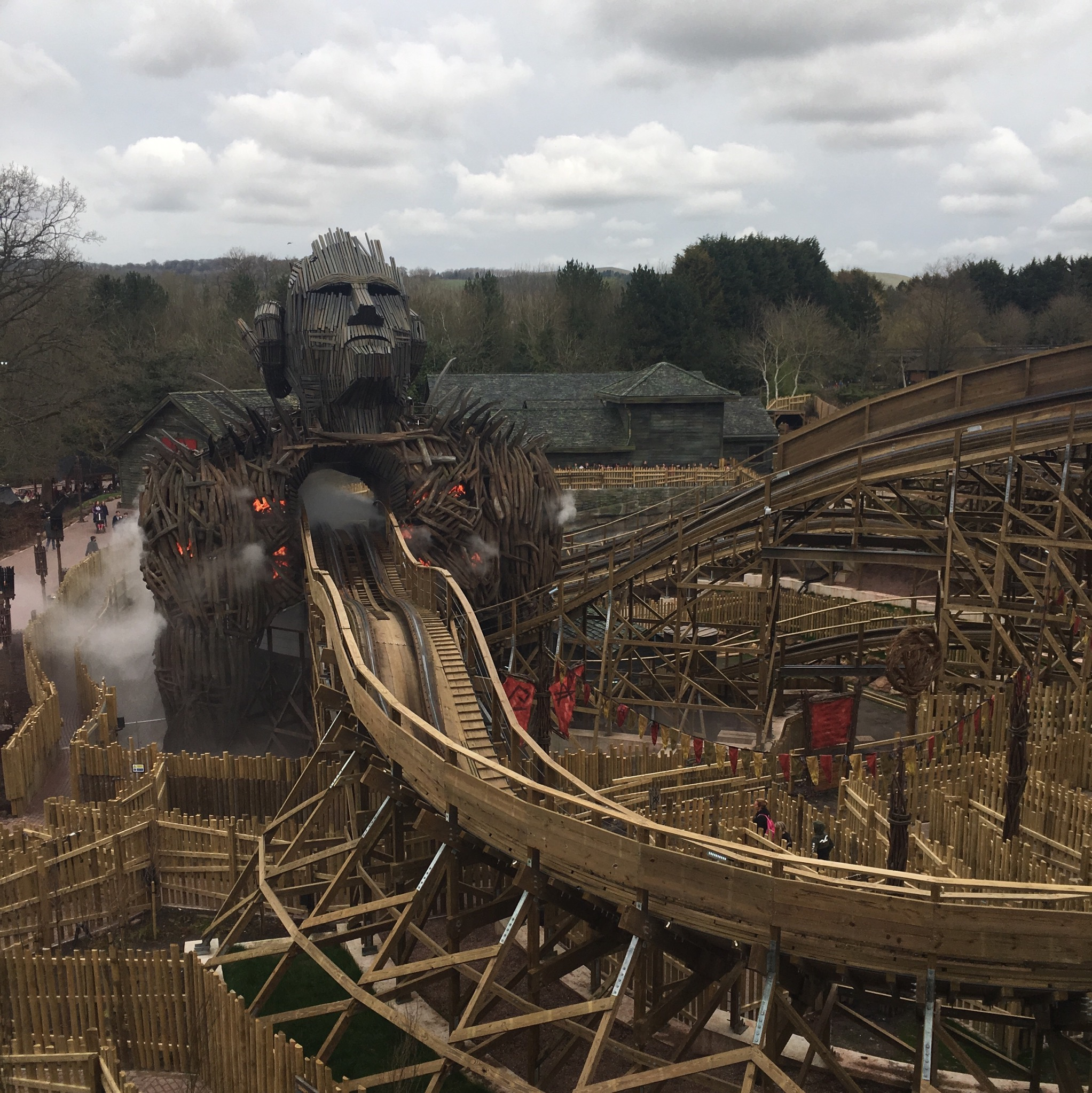
- The wooden statue “Big Bob” being surrounded by the track

Alton Towers
- Location: Alton Towers
- Park section: Mutiny Bay
- Coordinates: 52°59′20″N 1°53′19″W
- Status: Operating
- Opening date: 20 March 2018
- Cost: £16,000,000
- Replaced: The Flume

General statistics
- Type: Wood
- Manufacturer: Great Coasters International
- Designer: Skyline Design LLC
- Lift/launch system: Chain lift hill
- Drop: 72.2 ft (22.0 m)
- Length: 2,608.3 ft (795.0 m)
- Speed: 43.6 mph (70.2 km/h)
- Inversions: 0
- Duration: 1:50
- Capacity: 952 riders per hour
- Height restriction: 120 cm (3 ft 11 in)
- Trains: 3 trains with 12 cars; riders arranged 2 across in a single row for a total of 24 riders per train
- Website: Official website
- Fastrack available
- Wicker Man at RCDB

Wicker Man is a wooden roller coaster at Alton Towers theme park in Staffordshire, United Kingdom. Manufactured by Great Coasters International, the £16-million ride opened to the public on 20 March 2018 following a three-day weather delay. It set several milestones among wooden coasters including the first to be built in the UK in 22 years and the first to incorporate fire. Initially codenamed "Secret Weapon 8", a traditional naming scheme for major upcoming projects at Alton Towers, its official name was revealed in January 2018.

== History ==
In October 2015, The Flume was closed permanently, with an announcement made prior to the park reopening in 2016. Planning documents were submitted to Staffordshire Moorlands District Council on 23 April 2016. They documented the basic layout of the project, named "Secret Weapon 8" (SW8), and the surrounding area. The plans included retaining The Flume's former station building as a 'Smokehouse' restaurant, but this idea was dropped and the station was demolished. The Planning Applications Committee approved the plans on 25 August 2016.

Great Coasters International (GCI) manufactured the roller coaster, and its layout was primarily designed by Skyline Design, LLC. Audio and visual effects were handled by Alton Towers in coordination with Merlin Magic Making (MMM), an in-house division of Merlin Entertainment, along with Holovis and Backstage Technologies. Retired attraction developer John Wardley was brought in at a late stage to consult on the ride. He stated that he was "very impressed with the basic layout, the choice of manufacturer, and the theming concept" but criticised the ride's profile, in particular calling the first drop "atrocious". The first two drops were subsequently redesigned based on ideas he submitted, but the project was too far into development to alter other areas he described as lacking "major thrill".

Construction on the new ride commenced on 28 November 2016 with the demolition of The Flume. In 2017, a path leading from Mutiny Bay to Katanga Canyon was closed for the season for vehicle access to the construction site. The coaster's main structure – consisting of the station, shop and queue – was started in March 2017. The first timber for the coaster arrived at Alton Towers on 4 May 2017. The lift hill's construction reached its highest point in early July, and by October 2017, sections of track were installed.

A countdown began on Alton Towers' social media accounts in early January 2018, each day displaying a photo of each of the previous "Secret Weapon" roller coasters. On the eighth day, when all of the previous roller coasters had been displayed, the park announced the ride's name to be Wicker Man.

Wicker Man opened to the general public on 20 March 2018, three days behind schedule due to inclement weather. The opening ceremony for the ride was moved from 17 March 2018 to the following weekend on 24 March 2018. During opening weekend, the ride experienced intermittent closures.

On 26 July 2024, Wicker Man was evacuated and closed when smoke was seen coming from the ride. Alton Towers reported that the smoke was due to a foreign object that was on the track and stated the ride would be closed for maintenance "until further notice". A park spokesperson later clarified on X that Wicker Man is made out of "fire resistant treated wood that prevents ignition". Wicker Man reopened the following month after essential repairs on 17 August 2024.

== Promotion ==
On 16 March 2016, the park's "Towers Loving Care" Twitter account shared an image of construction fences surrounding its defunct attraction, The Flume. A sign was posted that read "SW8: Ground-Breaking New Ride Development", where SW8 was the shorthand for Secret Weapon 8. As the park has traditionally done in the past, they used a codename beginning with "Secret Weapon" followed by a number to refer to major projects under construction. A video was released on the ride's website in August 2017 and on YouTube detailing the park's previous Secret Weapon rides.

Several days following the video's release, signs around the construction site were updated with a phrase written in runic alphabet transliterating to "Be Chosen". The same phrase was burnt onto nearby wooden fences adjacent to some of the signs. The ride's potential name and logo was leaked by a website on 25 August 2017, discovered through a trademark filing by Alton Towers. A second video was released on 27 August 2017 featuring two hosts discussing past "Secret Weapon" rides in a large room filled with references to other rides in the park. The video included hidden messages designed to help decode the runic phrase that had been created for the ride.

During Scarefest at Alton Towers in 2017, the park debuted a new scare attraction called "The Welcoming: Be Chosen". It was described as a prequel to SW8, and its theme was centered around a cult village. A third video was released on 27 October 2017. Approximately halfway through, the video is interrupted by words written in the runic language:

We interrupt this to bring you good news. You are invited to a celebration; a celebration of our Earth and its beauty. All this noise. All this technology. It's too much, isn't it? There's no time or space to think, is there? Deep down you know the truth, don't you? The technology has now taken the reins. How did you get here? Maybe it doesn't matter. What matters is this chance; your opportunity to reconnect with the Earth. Come join us near the woods and partake in our celebration. How far you choose to go... that is your choice. What part you choose to play... only you can decide. Be chosen on the night where the living meets the dead.

Wicker Man's official name and logo were confirmed in a press release on 8 January 2018. Along with its spring opening date, it was revealed that the ride would be the world's first roller coaster to fuse wood with fire. On the same day, a promotion featured Wicker Man's logo being projected on the London Eye. Artwork to promote the ride was created by Kyle Lambert, with Hollywood-style illustrations of the ride passing through a flaming wicker man effigy.

== Characteristics ==
=== Statistics ===
Wicker Man is the tallest roller coaster at Alton Towers, standing 22 metres (72 ft) above the ground; 6 feet taller than Galactica, which stands at 20 metres (66 ft). The ride reaches a top speed of 70.2 kilometres per hour (43.6 miles per hour).

=== Ride experience ===
The ride begins with a pre-show inside a wicker dome featuring video projections, sound, and lighting effects before guests enter the station. Upon dispatch, the train completes a 180-degree right-hand turn, dipping through a smoke-filled tunnel with fire-effect lighting while sharply pivoting 180 degrees to the left. The train then ascends the lift hill; after reaching the apex, it makes a 180-degree left turn before dropping into an enclosed tunnel filled with smoke and light. This is followed by an airtime hill and a second drop through another tunnel, which features a banked right turn that quickly transitions into a banked left turn.

The track then leads into a large, swooping left-hand turn toward the Wicker Man effigy. As the train passes through the figure, flames flare from its shoulders while the track rises into a right-hand banked turn. The train passes through the figure a second time before executing a right-hand turn followed by a rising left-hand turn. After a 180-degree right-hand lateral turn, the train drops once more and passes through the Wicker Man statue for a third and final time. The experience concludes with a twisted airtime hill before the train returns to the station.

== Reception ==
Wicker Man was ranked fifth in the Amusement Today's Golden Ticket Awards for best new ride of 2018 with 5% of the vote.

Golden Ticket Awards: Best New Ride for 2018
| Ranking | 5 |

Golden Ticket Awards: Top wood Roller Coasters
| Year | | | | | | | | | 1998 | 1999 |
|---|---|---|---|---|---|---|---|---|---|---|
| Ranking | | | | | | | | | – | – |
| Year | 2000 | 2001 | 2002 | 2003 | 2004 | 2005 | 2006 | 2007 | 2008 | 2009 |
| Ranking | – | – | – | – | – | – | – | – | – | – |
| Year | 2010 | 2011 | 2012 | 2013 | 2014 | 2015 | 2016 | 2017 | 2018 | 2019 |
| Ranking | – | – | – | – | – | – | – | – | – | – |
| Year | 2020 | 2021 | 2022 | 2023 | 2024 | 2025 | 2026 | | | |
| Ranking | N/A | – | – | – | – | 39 | 38 | | | |
