= Scorpion Express =

Mine train themed roller coaster

- Previously known as Runaway Train

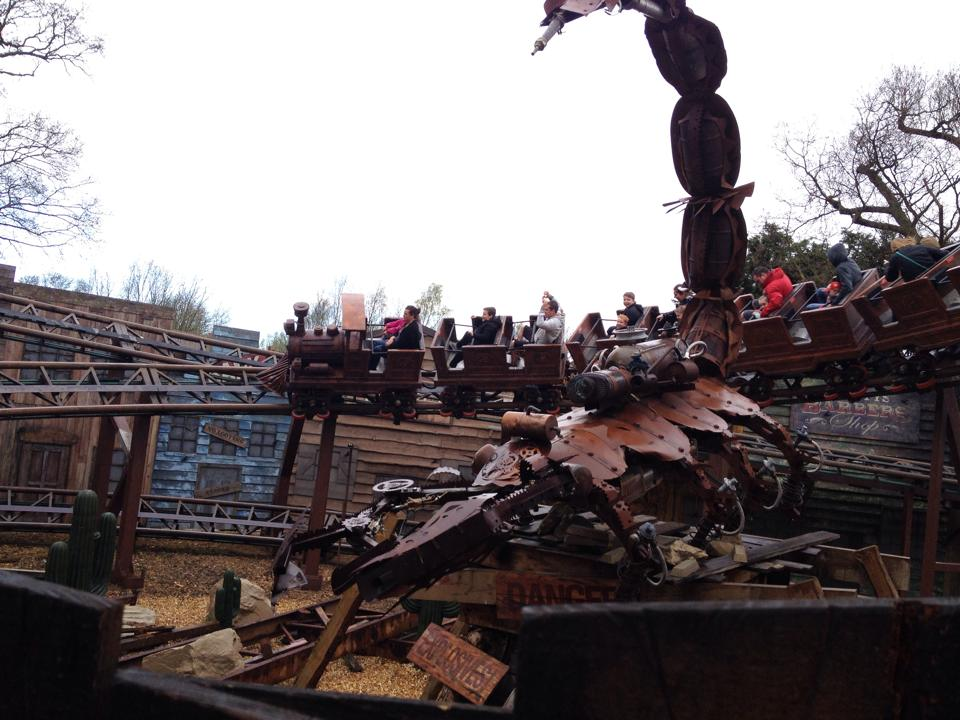

Chessington World of Adventures
- Location: Chessington World of Adventures
- Park section: Mexicana
- Coordinates: 51.349435°N 0.318012°W
- Status: Removed
- Opening date: 7 June 1987 as Runaway Train; 19 March 2014 as Scorpion Express
- Closing date: July 2022
- Replaced by: Chase's Mountain Mission

General statistics
- Type: Steel – Powered
- Manufacturer: Mack Rides
- Model: Blauer Enzian
- Height: 4.7 m (15 ft)
- Length: 259 m (850 ft)
- Speed: 22.4 mph (36.0 km/h)
- Inversions: 0
- Duration: 105 seconds
- Capacity: 700 riders per hour
- Height restriction: 90 cm (2 ft 11 in)
- Trains: Single train with 10 cars; riders arranged 2 across in 2 rows with the exception of the first car which has a single row for a total of 38 riders per train
- Reserve and Ride available
- Wheelchair accessible
- Must transfer from wheelchair
- Scorpion Express at RCDB

Scorpion Express (originally the Runaway Train) was a powered mine train roller coaster at Chessington World of Adventures in Greater London, England. It opened with the theme park in 1987 as the Runaway Train. The original ride was closed in 2012 for refurbishment and reopened on 14 March 2014, with the same track layout but new name and theming. Scorpion Express is set in a small mining village, featuring an animated metalwork scorpion. Scorpion Express closed in July 2022 following a fire, and, as of September 2024, it was revealed in the future planning proposals for the park that it would not return.

== History ==
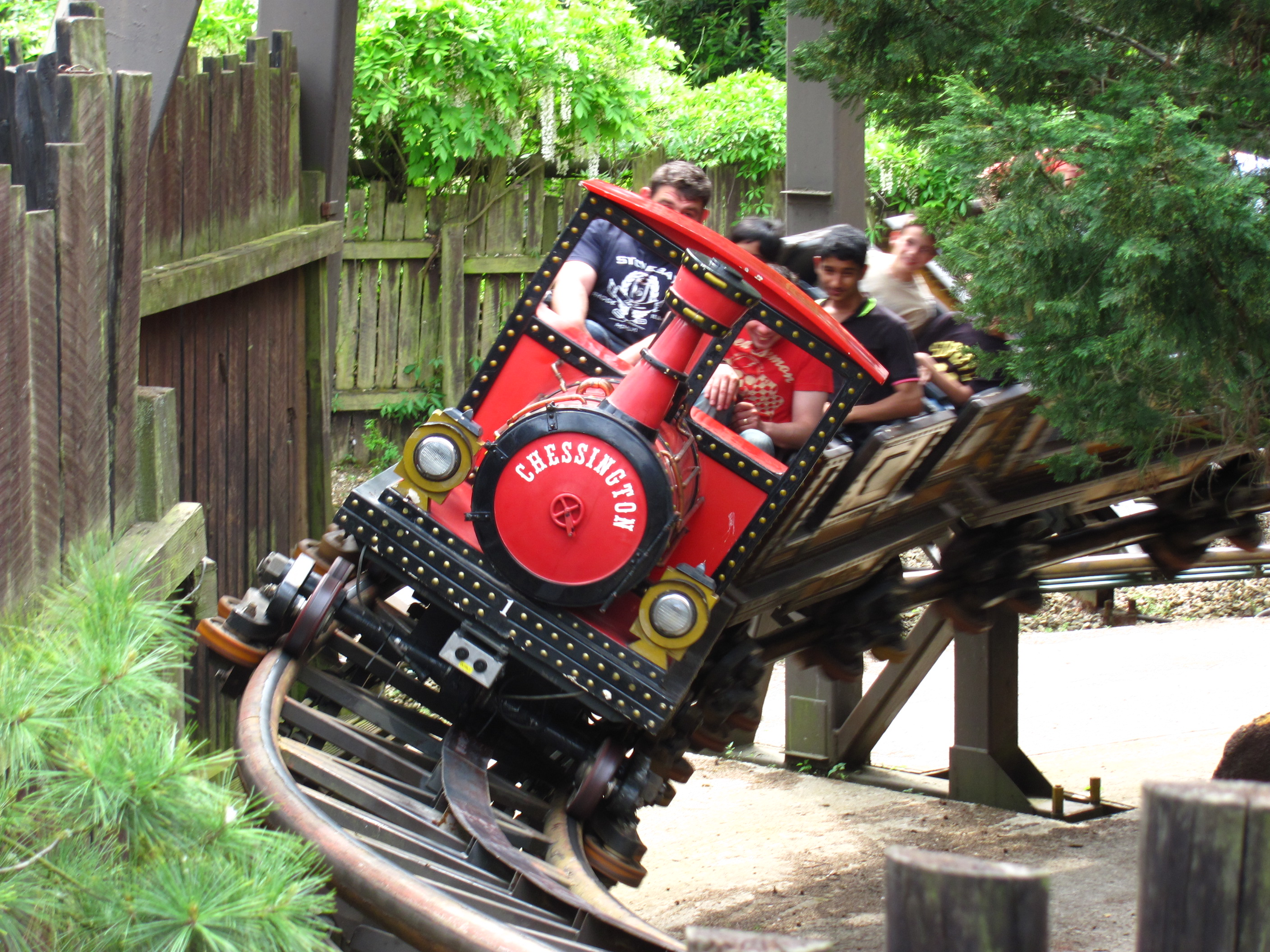
The Runaway Train in 2010

The ride was a Mack Blauer Enzian family coaster which originally opened as the Runaway Mine Train, developed by John Wardley, and operated for over twenty-five years. It had an Old Western theme, and featured an extensively themed area and queue taking guests above buildings, around a lake and down into a small mine.

The coaster was originally designed to travel in and out of a cave feature, which enclosed half the track and hid much of the structure, creating an interacting rocky landscape. However, due to its semi-temporary construction and prolonged lack of maintenance over the years, the cave feature was removed in late 2012 and the ride closed.

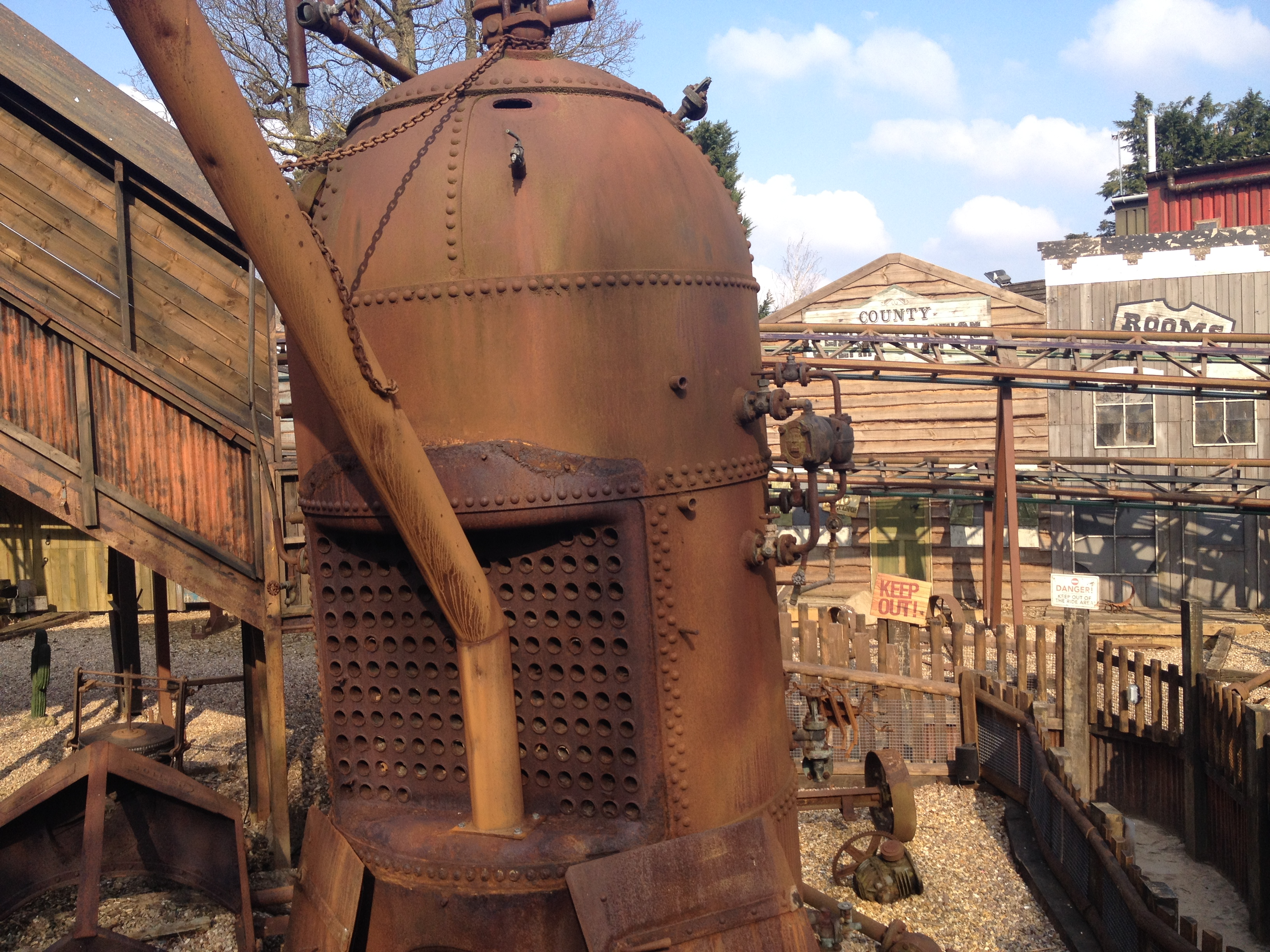
Boiler feature in the queue

In 2013, the area surrounding the Runaway Train was boarded off with notices up saying that the ride would be "Re-launching in 2014". Over the closed season, the animatronic scorpion was installed after 208 hours of off-site construction. During this downtime, the ride had all its original cave design, landscaping and theming features removed, now placing the track completely in the open and the queue on flat ground.

The ride was complete on time to open for the park's Annual Passholder Preview Days when it soft-opened. The ride officially launched on Wednesday 19 March after having slight alterations and theming adjustments.

=== Advertising ===
During the resort's annual February Half-Term event – African Adventures – advertising for the ride was placed on large billboards at the zoo entrance and on the back of the gate maps. At the same time a mini site for the ride was launched on the park's website, which showed the concept art for the attraction among other details. During this time, it was also announced that the ride would feature fire, water and smoke effects, as well as an animated scorpion.

Days after the ride's soft opening, adverts for the attraction were broadcast across British television. Several other media stunts including newspaper articles about the ride appeared at this time. None of the footage used in the Scorpion Express TV adverts was from the actual ride, instead shots of a bigger (but similarly themed) family coaster at Heide Park, and computer-generated clips, were used to advertise the ride.

Scorpion Express received mixed response since its launch in 2014, largely to do with its minimal theme featured compared to how the ride was originally designed. However, it remained a popular family attraction as it had since opening in 1987.

=== Fire and closure ===
Scorpion Express closed indefinitely following an incident in July 2022. Whilst no official announcements were made by the park confirming any details about the incident, reports about the ride indicate that a fire broke out on the ride vehicle, damaging it. Despite a glimmer of hope for a reopening in early 2023, the ride did not reopen.

As of June 2024, even though the ride no longer appears on any maps or other promotional material for the park, the 'Ride Availability' page of the official website continued to list Scorpion Express as 'Closed until further notice'.

In September 2024, two new projects were introduced: Project Refresh and Project Play. Project Refresh is set to replace Wild Asia, while Project Play will take over Mexicana, resulting in the permanent closure of the Scorpion Express. However, Rattlesnake will remain operational and is expected to be rethemed to fit either Forbidden Kingdom or Adventure Point.

In March 2025, following the removal of the ride, Chessington held an online auction with items such has operator panels, signs and theming being bidded on. Alongside this, Scorpion Express was removed from the Ride Availability page.

In 2026, Project Play, which opened as Paw Patrol Land, has officially replaced the attraction.

== Description ==
The ride's premise revolves around a town named Scorpion Valley, which has supposedly been overrun with scorpions after an explosion caused the gold mine to collapse and all the residents fled the town, according to text and posters stuck up in the switchback queue line. The Town Governor has supposedly left behind a giant, mechanical steam-powered scorpion fashioned from scrap metal from the debris of the explosion, in an attempt to guard the gold from chancing looters.

=== Queue ===
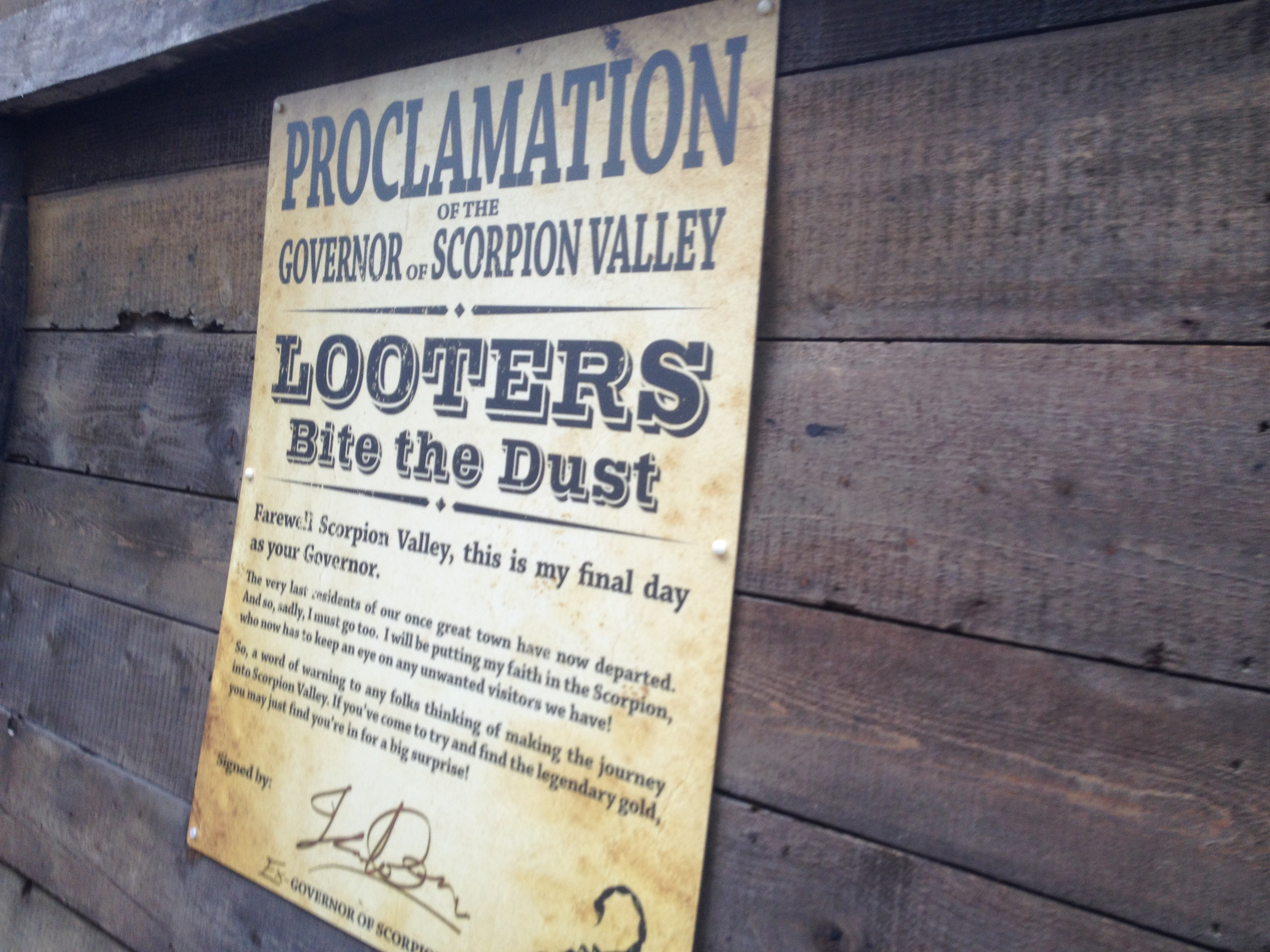
Vinyl posters in the queue for Scorpion Express display the ride's backstory.

The new ride in Mexicana starts with a long winding queue. At the start of the queue, a radio station can be heard playing in the background, notices from the Governor of Scorpion Valley are pinned up in the queue, which reveal the ride's backstory. Riders then enter and queue in a dark, mine-themed building where live scorpions feature. Upon exiting, riders go over a bridge, before arriving at the station.

=== Ride ===
The ride takes guests on a train journey through an abandoned mining town, across deserts and near to the mine itself. It features animatronic scenery, smoke, fire and water effects. The height minimum is 90 cm, while guests with a torso +51 inches are not able to ride. Riders under 110 cm must be accompanied by a person aged 16 or over. The layout is a basic figure of 8 loop with a straight piece of track at the back and consists of several helixes, some of which go over and under the queue line, which itself snakes around the ride. The ride makes at least two laps of the circuit, and more on off peak days. An on-ride photo is taken immediately before the train returns to enter the station for the first time.

== Gallery ==
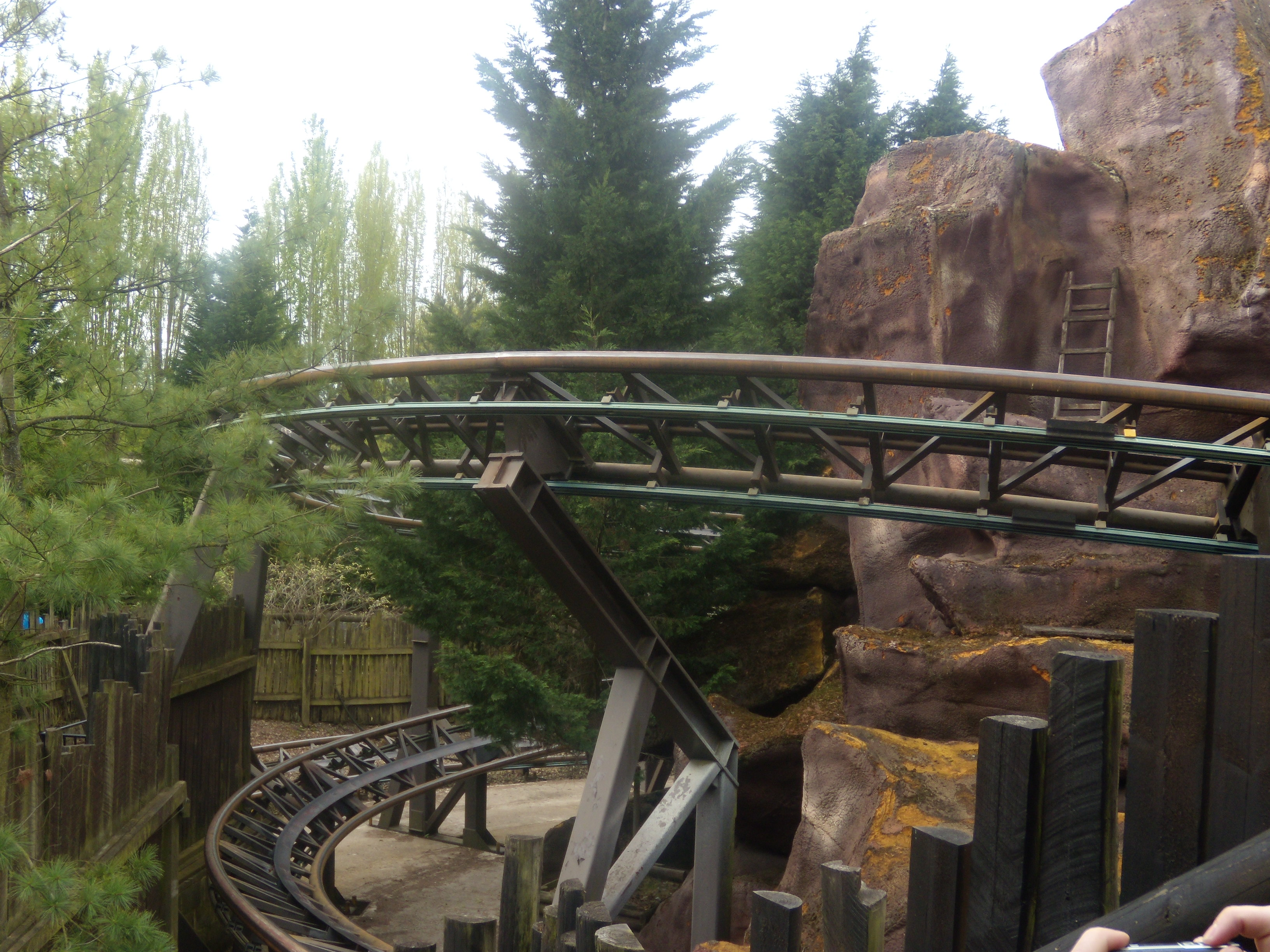
The Runaway Train tracks

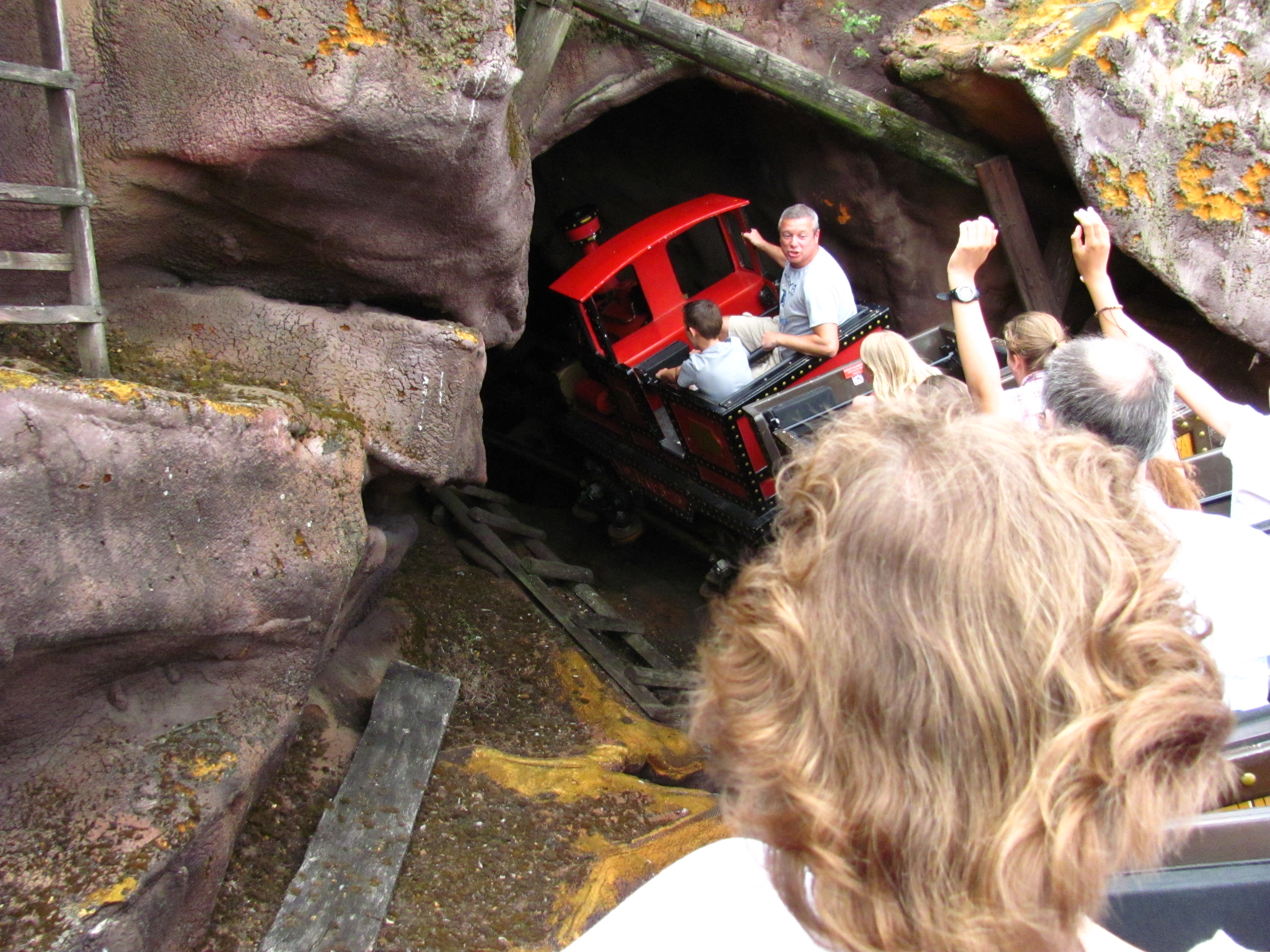
The Runaway Train tunnel

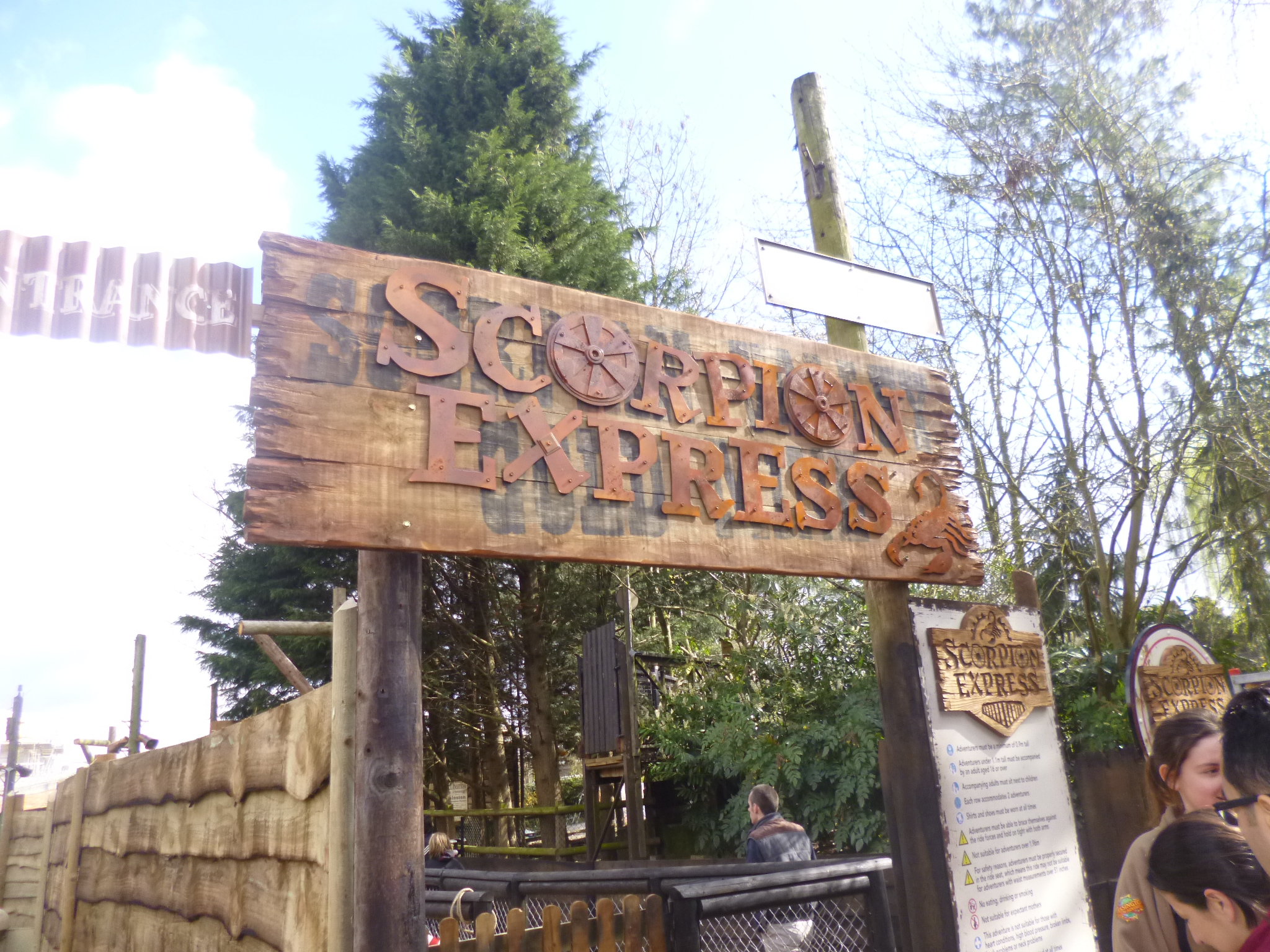
Ride entrance

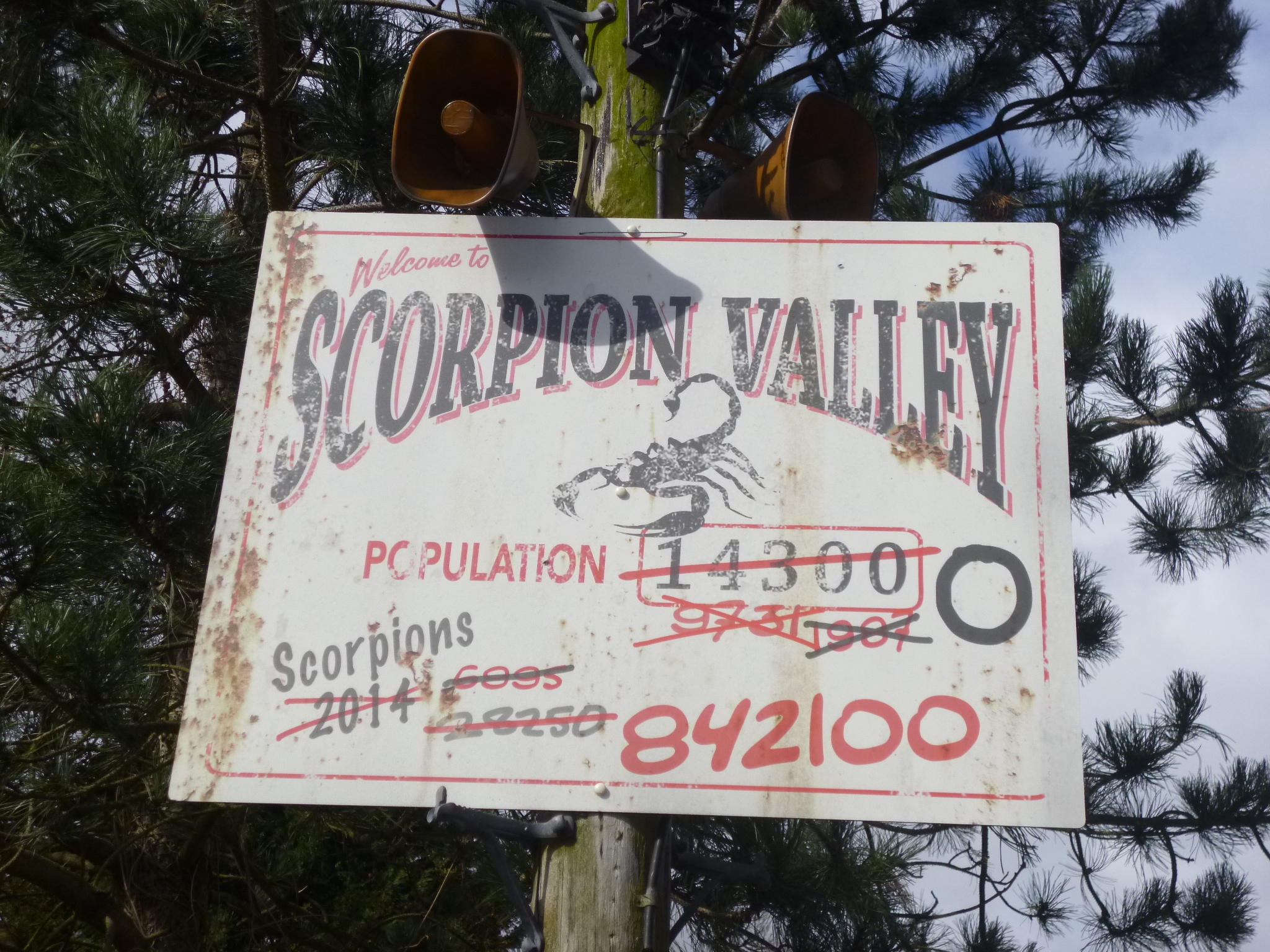
Scorpion Valley theming

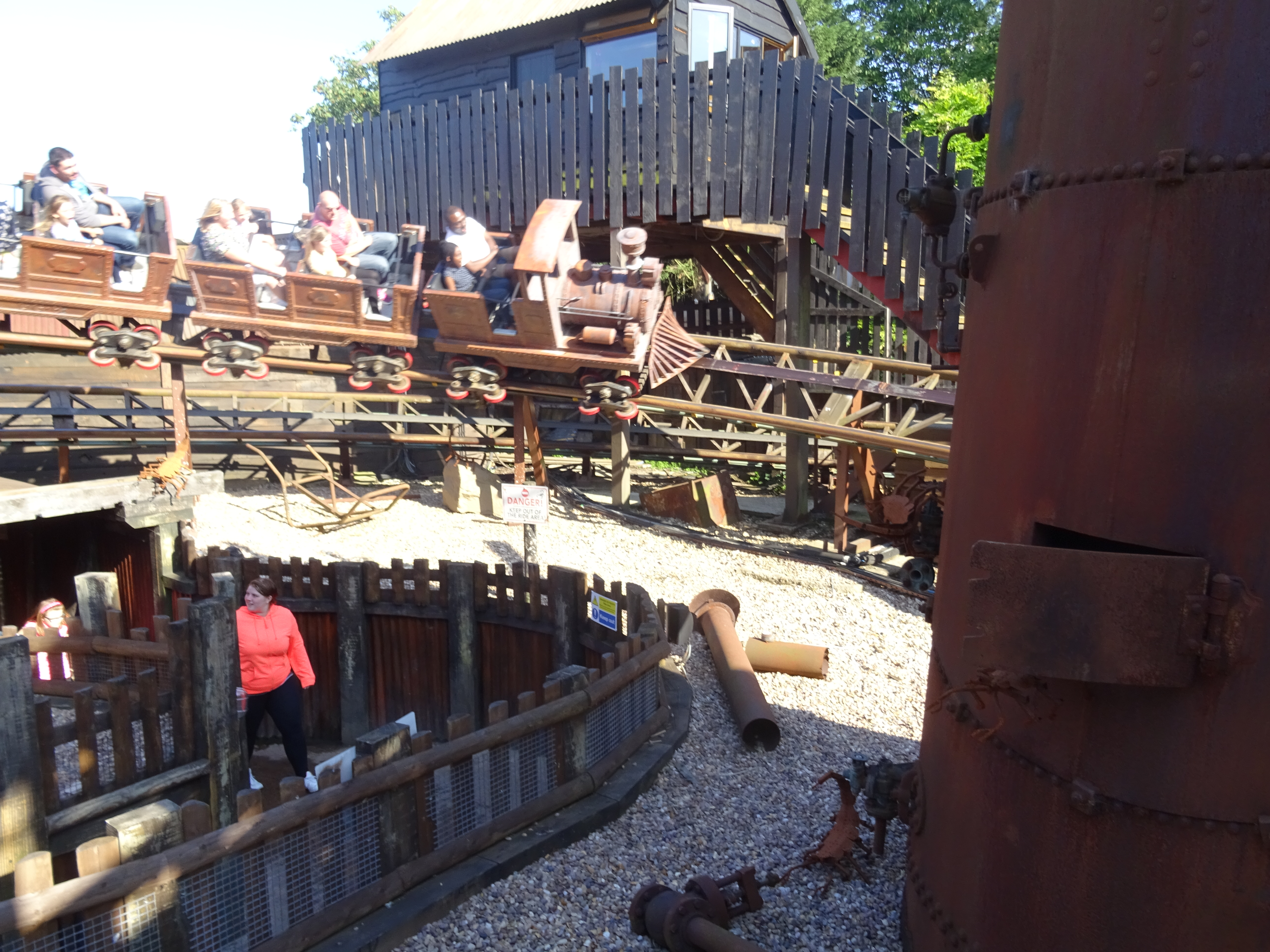
Ride in 2015

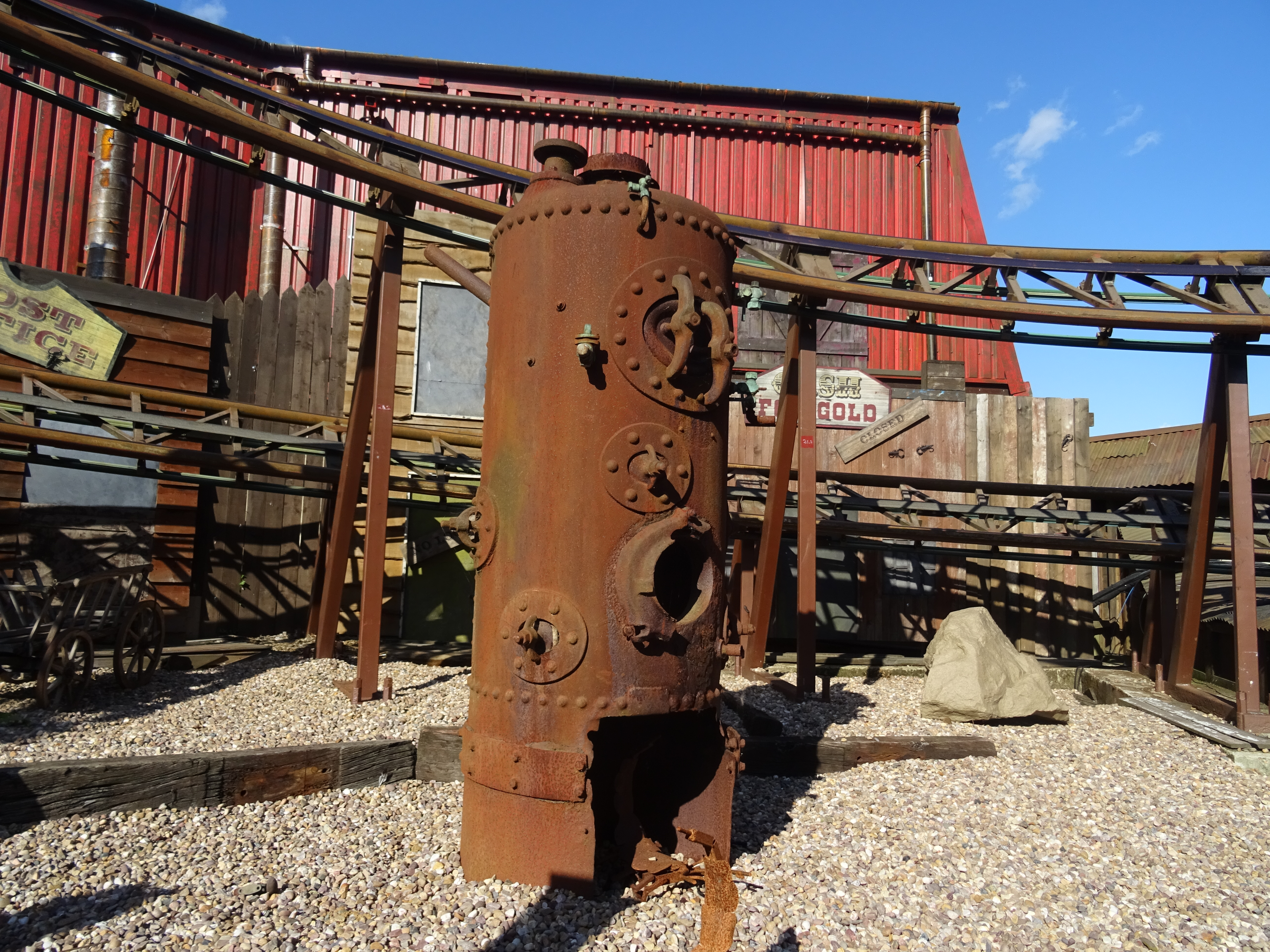
Scattered mine theming

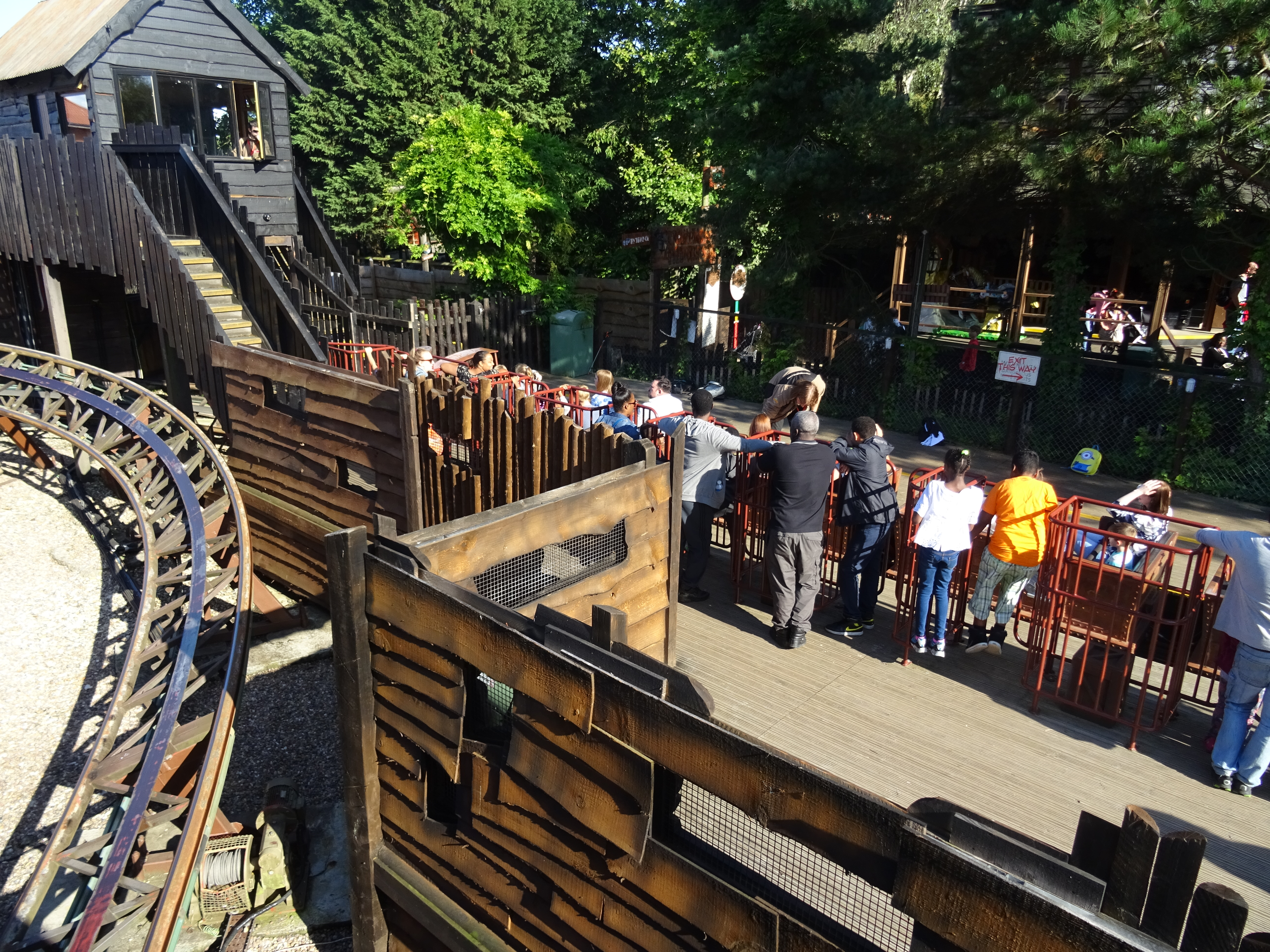
Loading platform
