= The Haunted House (Alton Towers) =

Ghost train dark ride

Coordinates: 52.98897°N 1.884314°W

Alton Towers Resort
- Area: Gloomy Wood
- Status: Removed
- Opening date: 30 March 1992
- Closing date: 2002
- Replaced by: Duel – The Haunted House Strikes Back!

Ride statistics
- Attraction type: Dark ride, haunted attraction
- Manufacturer: Mack Rides
- Designer: Sparks Group
- Theme: Haunted
- Capacity: 1,920 riders per hour
- Vehicle type: Car
- Vehicles: 35
- Riders per vehicle: 6
- Rows: 2
- Riders per row: 3
- Duration: 6 minutes 15 seconds
- Must transfer from wheelchair

The Haunted House was a dark ride at the Alton Towers theme park near the village of Alton in Staffordshire, England, opened in 1992. There was a minimum height restriction of 0.9 metres with guests under 1.1 metres accompanied by an adult.

In 2003 it received a retheme as Duel – The Haunted House Strikes Back! with the addition of a laser shooting game and a zombie overlay, before being redesigned in 2023 as The Curse at Alton Manor.

== Development ==
The Haunted House was designed and built for Alton Towers by the Sparks Group, with the development led by John Wardley. It was the largest haunted attraction in Europe at the time of opening. The bespoke ride transit system was built by MACK Rides and designed to allow a high throughput whilst leaving the cars to travel the ride separately, and at varying speeds in different areas. It opened on 30 March 1992.

By 2002, many of the original scenes had been altered and the park decided to revamp the attraction as an interactive dark ride, with the addition of laser guns. Towards the end of the 2002 season, a poster was placed outside advertising the new name and opening date, announcing: "Whatever you do, don't miss! Duel - The Haunted House Strikes Back!". The final scene was replaced entirely and zombies were added throughout the ride, along with other changes to the ride's theme and scenes.

== Ride experience ==
Guests queued past gravestones in a wooded area, before entering through the front doors of the house. The interior queue meandered through themed rooms, depicting a darkly-lit Victorian vestibule and drawing room. These scenes featured a number of illusion, themed aroma and haunting music. The second room was also slanted at an angle to disorientate guests. On the left side of the room was a doll's house which used a Pepper's Ghost illusion to show the ghostly image of a little girl, nicknamed named Emily Alton, and her pet cat playing within.

In the station, guests boarded a ride vehicle. Once beyond the platform, the vehicles spaced apart from one another to take riders into the scenes individually. The first scene took riders past cracking stone walls that appeared possessed. This led to the Grand Hall, which apart from a static stone bust looked seemingly empty before a large horned demon appeared overhead between two columns. This effect was originally achieved with parallel mirrors and timed lighting. The car then swerved right into a dark corner, where the demon re-appeared offering a teacup (later changed to holding a knife and giant rat).

The car traveled into a stone chamber and towards large skull-shaped stone effigy and into the skull's mouth. Inside, a large rotating trommel tunnel gave riders the sensation of turning upside-down. After passing bats spun on various carousel mobiles with uv strobes, the ride continued into a stone corridor with large Gothic windows either side. Large ghouls lurched from windows towards riders, before the car passed the largest window with a giant staring face.

The next scene took riders weaving past large spiders and webs, beginning with a voice whispering 'Are you scared of spiders?' and past increasingly large spiders, ending with a giant-sized spider suspended overhead. Riders then entered a corridor where a formally dressed skeleton called "Electric Bill", pulls a lever on a fuse box, turning out the lights. This area originally featured a large ghost that flew overhead down the corridor, but it was removed after its first year and replaced by the scene featuring skeletons in 1993. In turn, most of the skeleton scene was also removed in later years. The car then turned through a series of tight bends in the dark, as screaming heads fly overhead using a UV-strobe effect.

Riders then traveled into a sinister garden at night, at which point the car slowed down. A crashed hearse could be seen ahead, with an undertaker gesturing you to come closer and ghosts flying out of an open coffin (using a Pepper's Ghost illusion). Further into the garden, a troll-like humanoid ghoul with his tongue out leapt out from rocks on the right. A statue of Death stood at the end of the garden. Behind an archway, a stone column suddenly turns to reveal a tall, thin bird-like demon before the cars accelerated onwards. The finale then traveled further into the garden, where riders traveled through a possessed rocky swamp as various monsters, serpentine creatures and ghouls appeared.
