= 2023 in amusement parks =

This is a list of events, openings, and closings that occurred in amusement parks in 2023.

== Amusement parks ==
=== Opening ===
- Bangladesh Mana Bay - September 22
- Mexico VidantaWorld - August 1
- United Arab Emirates SeaWorld Abu Dhabi - May 23
- United States Island Waterpark at Showboat – July 4

=== Reopened ===
- United States Sengme Oaks Water Park

=== Renamed ===
- United States Hawaiian Falls Garland » Hawaiian Waters Garland
- United States Hawaiian Falls The Colony » Hawaiian Waters The Colony

=== Birthdays ===
- Carowinds – 50th anniversary
- SeaWorld Orlando - 50th anniversary

=== Closed ===
- Qingdao Joypolis - May 31
- Coney Island - December 31

== Additions ==
=== Roller coasters ===
==== New ====
Name	Park	Type	Manufacturer	Opened	Ref(s)
Arctic Rescue	SeaWorld San Diego	Motorbike launched roller coaster	Intamin	June 2	
Aquaman: Power Wave	Six Flags Over Texas	Steel launched shuttle roller coaster	Mack Rides	March 11	
ArieForce One	Fun Spot America Atlanta	Steel roller coaster	Rocky Mountain Construction	March 31	
Big Bear Mountain	Dollywood	Launched roller coaster	Vekoma	May 12	
DarKoaster: Escape The Storm	Busch Gardens Williamsburg	Indoor motorbike launched roller coaster	Intamin	May 19	
Kid Flash Cosmic Coaster	Six Flags Fiesta Texas; Six Flags Over Georgia	Single rail dual-tracked roller coaster	Skyline Attractions	November 4	
Mandrill Mayhem	Chessington World of Adventures	Shuttle Wing Coaster	Bolliger & Mabillard	May 15	
Mission Ferrari	Ferrari World Abu Dhabi	Enclosed launched roller coaster	Dynamic Attractions	January 12	
Pipeline: The Surf Coaster	SeaWorld Orlando	Launched stand-up roller coaster	Bolliger & Mabillard	May 27	
Primordial	Lagoon Amusement Park	4D Dark ride roller coaster	ART Engineering	September 15	
Snoopy's Racing Railway	Canada's Wonderland	Family launched roller coaster	ART Engineering	June	
Toutatis	Parc Astérix	Launched roller coaster	Intamin	April 8	
TRON Lightcycle / Run	Magic Kingdom	Motorbike launched roller coaster	Vekoma	April 4	
Wandering Oaken's Sliding Sleighs	Hong Kong Disneyland	Junior roller coaster	Vekoma	November 20	
Zambezi Zinger	Worlds of Fun	Wooden roller coaster	Great Coasters International	June 19	

==== Relocated ====
Name	Park	Type	Manufacturer	Opened	Formerly	Ref(s)
Matugani	Lost Island Theme Park	Accelerator Coaster	Intamin	May 20	Kanonen at Liseberg	

==== Refurbished ====
Name	Park	Type	Manufacturer	Opened	Formerly	Ref(s)
Wildcat's Revenge	Hersheypark	Hybrid steel roller coaster	Rocky Mountain Construction	June 2	Wildcat	

=== Other new attractions ===
==== New ====
Name	Park	Type	Opened	Ref(s)
Air Racers	Carowinds	Zamperla Air Race	April 7	
Airwalker	Carowinds	Zamperla Disk'O	April 7	
Bombs Away	Raging Waters Los Angeles	WhiteWater West trapdoor water slide	May	
Cargo Loco	Kings Island	Zamperla Spinning Tea Cup	June 10	
Frozen Ever After	Hong Kong Disneyland	Reversing Shoot the Chute/Dark ride	November 20	
Gear Spin	Carowinds	Zamperla NebulaZ	April 7	
Happily Ever After	Magic Kingdom	Multimedia and pyrotechnic show	April 3	
Journey of Water	Epcot	Interactive water garden	October 16	
Mario Kart: Bowser's Challenge	Universal Studios Hollywood	Augmented Reality Dark Ride	February 17	
Rocket Blast	Waldameer & Water World	ProSlide Technology water coaster	June 15	
Serengeti Flyer	Busch Gardens Tampa Bay	Screamin' Swing	February 27	
Super Nintendo World	Universal Studios Hollywood	Themed area	February 17	
Sol Spin	Kings Island	Zamperla Endeavour	June 10	
Tundra Twister	Canada's Wonderland	Mondial Avalanche	June	
Wind Star	Carowinds	Zamperla WindstarZ	April 7	
World of Jumanji	Chessington World of Adventures	Themed area	May 15	
Yuta Falls	Lost Island Theme Park	Interlink Log flume	May 20	

==== Refurbished ====
Name	Park	Type	Opened	Formerly	Ref(s)
Hover and Dodge	Carowinds	Bumper cars	April 7	Dodg'ems	
Kenny and Belinda's Dreamland	Dreamworld	Themed area	March 31	DreamWorks Experience	

==== Relocated ====
Name	Park	Type	Manufacturer	Opened	Formerly	Ref(s)
Gyro Force	Carowinds	Wipeout	Wipeout	Spring 2024	Lady Luck at Adventureland	

== Closed attractions & roller coasters ==
Name	Park	Type	Closed	Refs
Alpine Bobsled	Six Flags Great Escape and Hurricane Harbor	Bobsled roller coaster	September 4	
Camp Bus	Knott's Berry Farm	Zamperla Flying Carpet	August	
Fire in the Hole	Silver Dollar City	Enclosed roller coaster	December 30	
Mardi Gras Hangover	Six Flags Great America	Fire Ball	October	
Mindbender	Galaxyland	Indoor twister looping coaster	January 30	
Poseidon's Fury	Universal Islands of Adventure	Special effects show	May 10	
Raging Rapids in Boulder Canyon	Holiday World & Splashin' Safari	River rapids ride	June 14	
Revolution	Six Flags Great America	HUSS frisbee	October	
Rock & Roll	Santa Cruz Beach Boardwalk	Matterhorn	2023	
Timberline Twister	Knott's Berry Farm	Kiddie roller coaster	August	
Sand Serpent	Busch Gardens Tampa Bay	Wild mouse roller coaster	July 9	
Splash Mountain	Magic Kingdom	Log flume	January 23	
Vikings' River Splash	Legoland Windsor Resort	River rapids ride	September 25	
