= Helix (roller coaster) =

Steel roller coaster at Liseberg

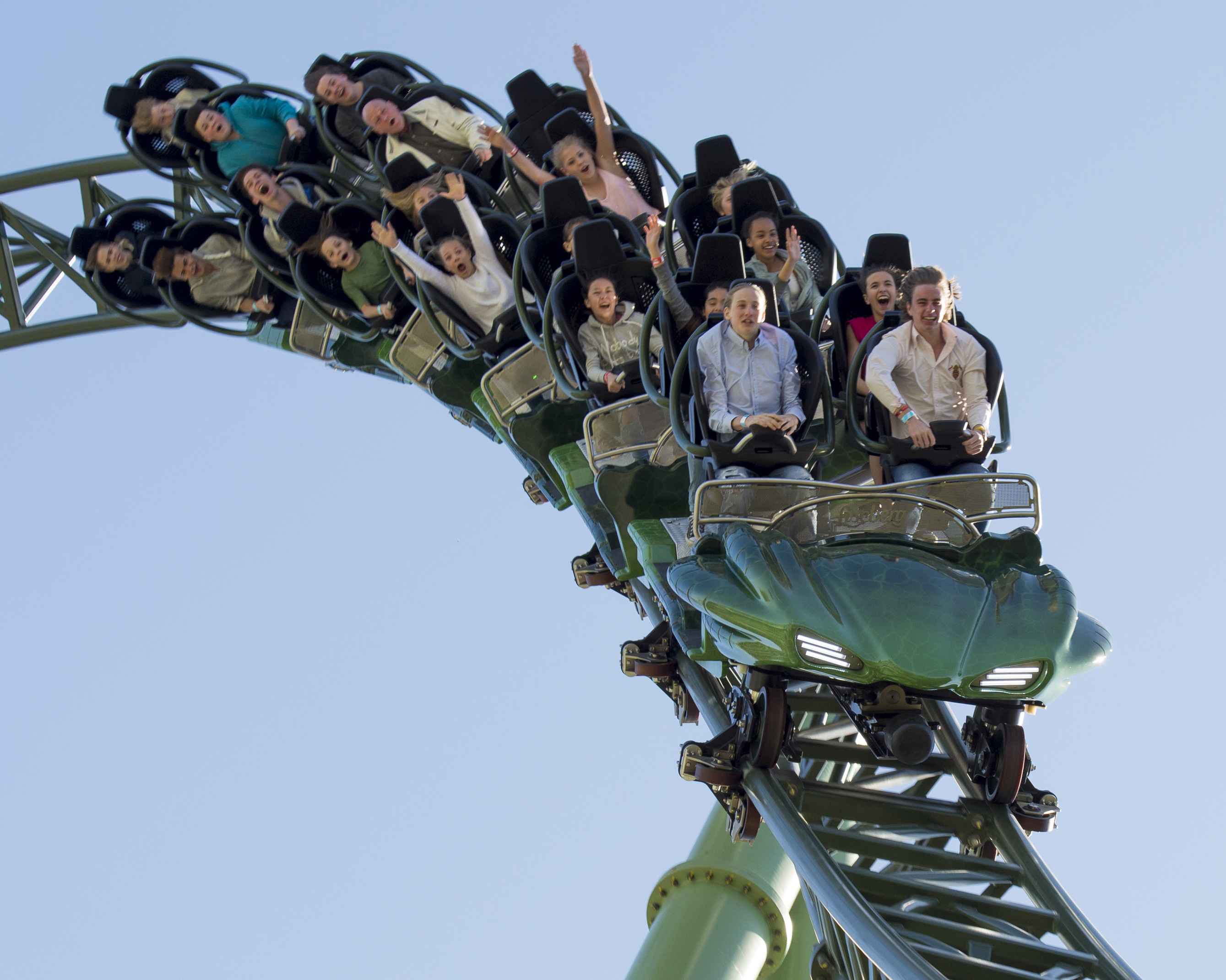
- Helix on its opening day

Liseberg
- Location: Liseberg
- Coordinates: 57°41′43.2″N 11°59′26.8″E
- Status: Operating
- Opening date: 26 April 2014
- Cost: approx. 239,000,000 SEK

General statistics
- Type: Steel – Launched
- Manufacturer: Mack Rides
- Designer: Ing.-Büro Stengel GmbH
- Lift/launch system: LSM launch (x2)
- Height: 41 m (135 ft)
- Length: 1,381 m (4,531 ft)
- Speed: 100 km/h (62 mph)
- Inversions: 7
- Duration: 2:10
- Capacity: 1,350 riders per hour
- G-force: 4.3 g
- Height restriction: 51 in (130 cm)
- Trains: 3 trains with 5 cars; riders arranged 2 across in 2 rows for a total of 20 riders per train
- Helix at RCDB

Video

Helix is a steel roller coaster located at Liseberg in Gothenburg, Sweden. The ride, built by Mack Rides, features two linear synchronous motor launches and has a top speed of 100 km/h (62 mph). It features a 41-metre-tall (135 ft) dual-launch helix. The ride opened on 26 April 2014, Liseberg's opening date for the 2014 season. Helix is the first roller coaster in the world that has a 1-on-1 replica virtual reality experience. This experience is created by ArchiVision, a Dutch 3D studio. During the first two weeks after the premiere visitors could experience the virtual reality replica next to the roller coaster's entrance.

The roller coaster's station building is located where the 3D cinema Maxxima used to be, by the foot of the tower AtmosFear. The 1,381-metre-long (4,531 ft) track follows the hillside in a custom-made track design. The elements during the ride include two corkscrews, a pretzel knot, a top hat, a zero-g roll, and a rare Norwegian loop. The estimated cost for the project is about 239,000,000 Swedish kronor.

== History ==
In October 2012, Liseberg announced that they would be adding a new attraction for the 2014 season. The park hired Mack Rides to build a multi-launch roller coaster with a terrain layout. It would be codenamed Projekt Helix.

Vertical construction of Helix began in October 2013 when the supports were built on a rocky hill.

Helix opened on 26 April 2014.

== Awards ==
Golden Ticket Awards: Top steel Roller Coasters
Year									1998	1999
Ranking									–	–
Year	2000	2001	2002	2003	2004	2005	2006	2007	2008	2009
Ranking	–	–	–	–	–	–	–	–	–	–
Year	2010	2011	2012	2013	2014	2015	2016	2017	2018	2019
Ranking	–	–	–	–	30	34	29	29 (tie)	21	19
Year	2020	2021	2022	2023	2024	2025	2026			
Ranking	N/A	40	30	18	40	28	29			

== Photos ==
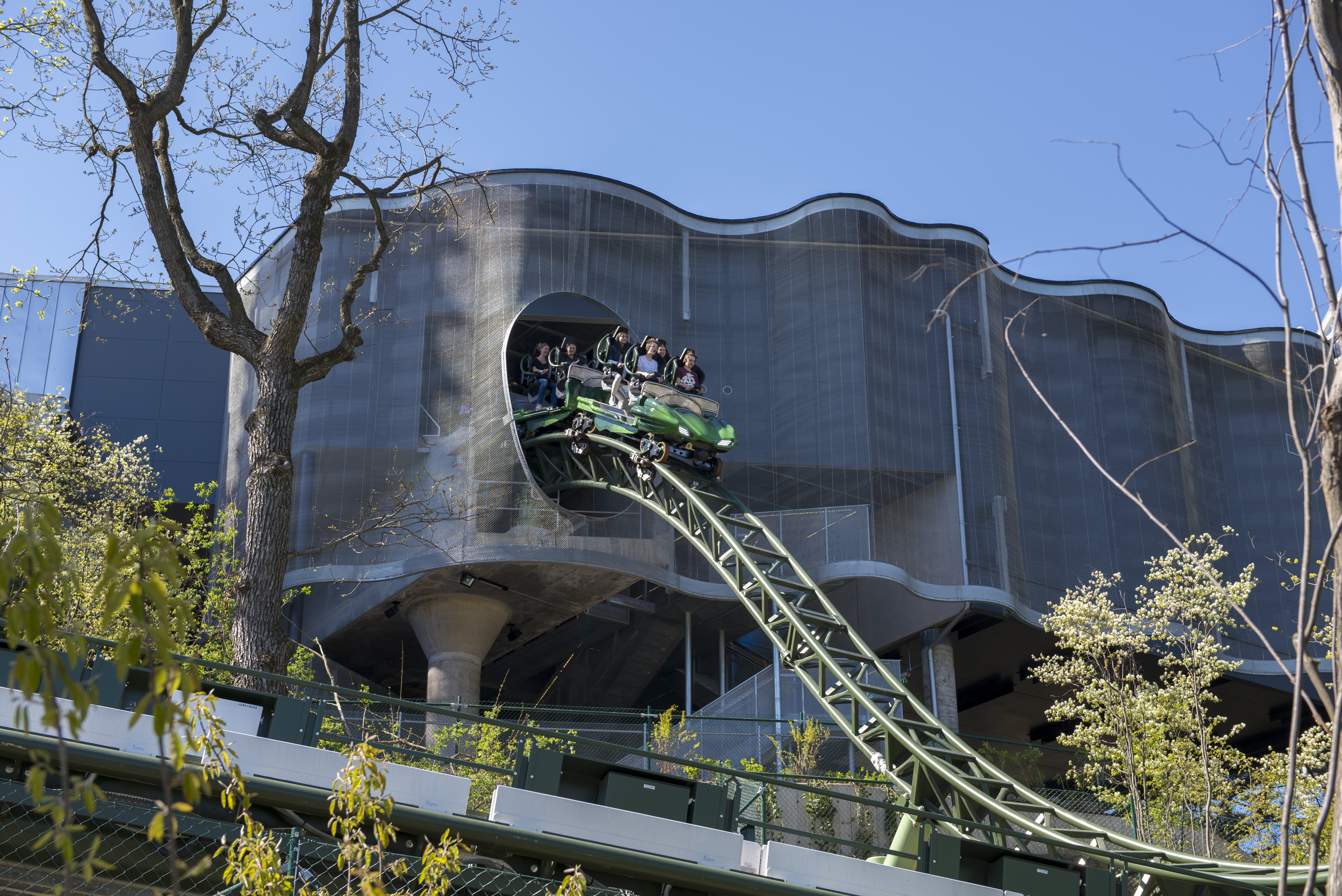
A train leaving the station

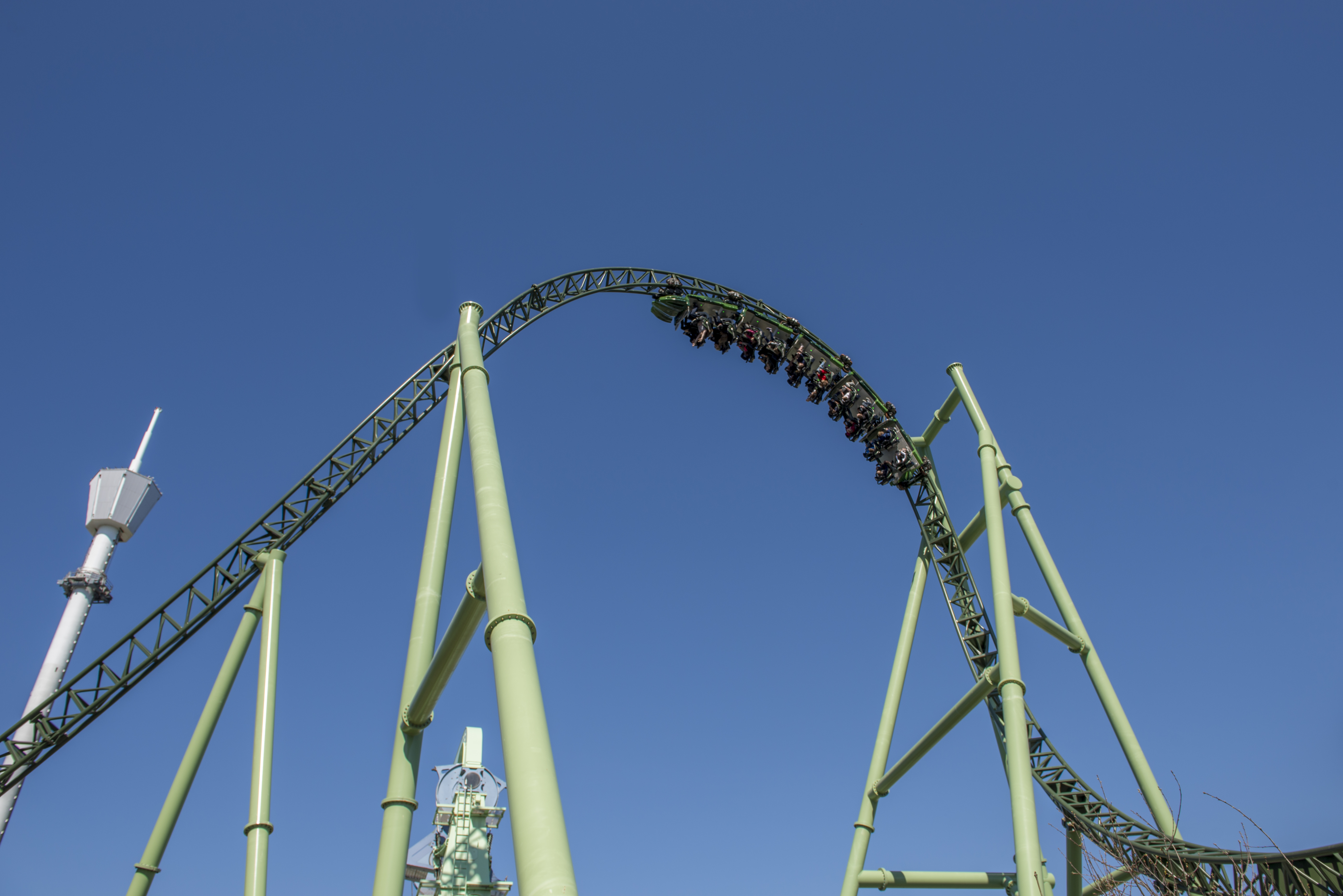

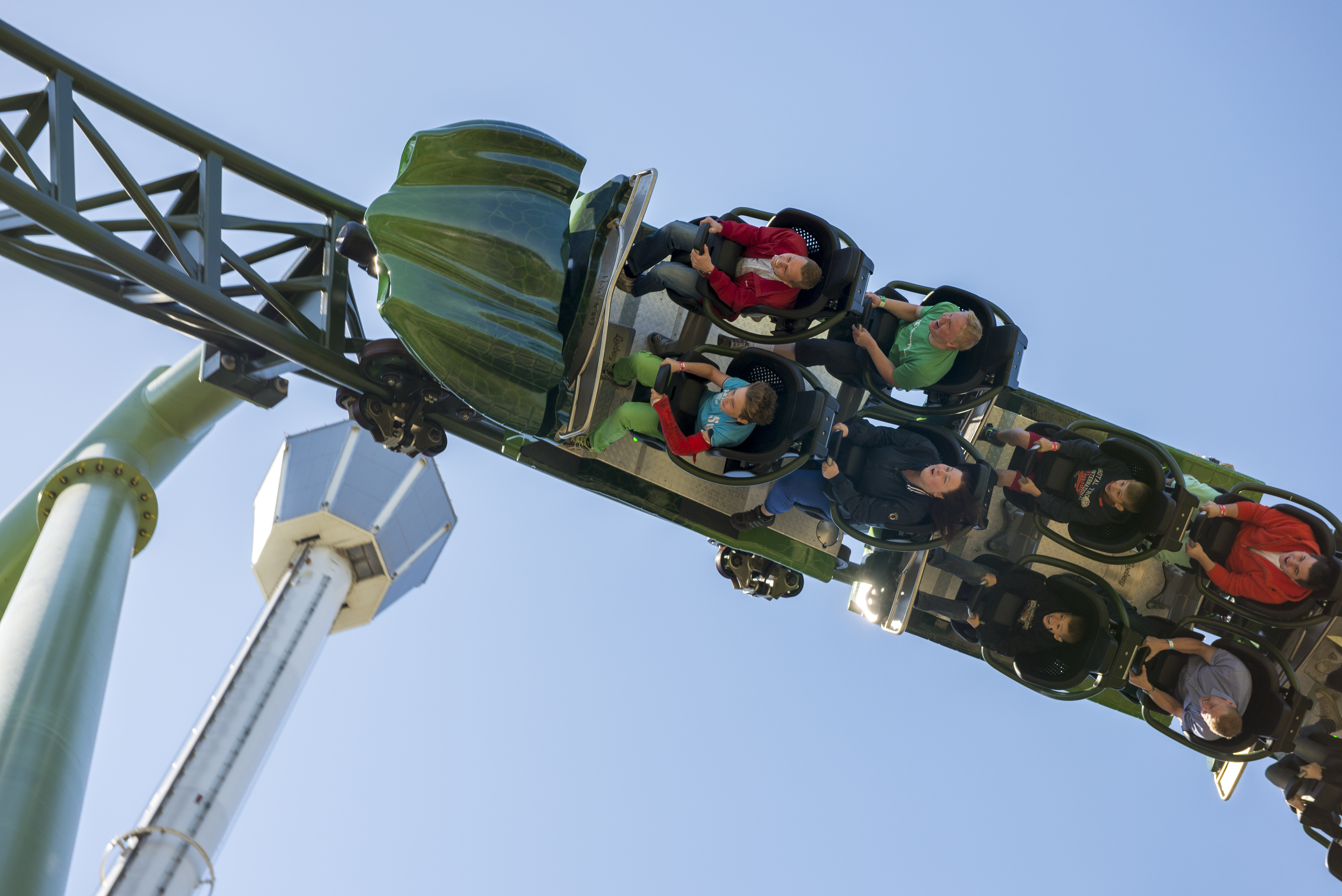

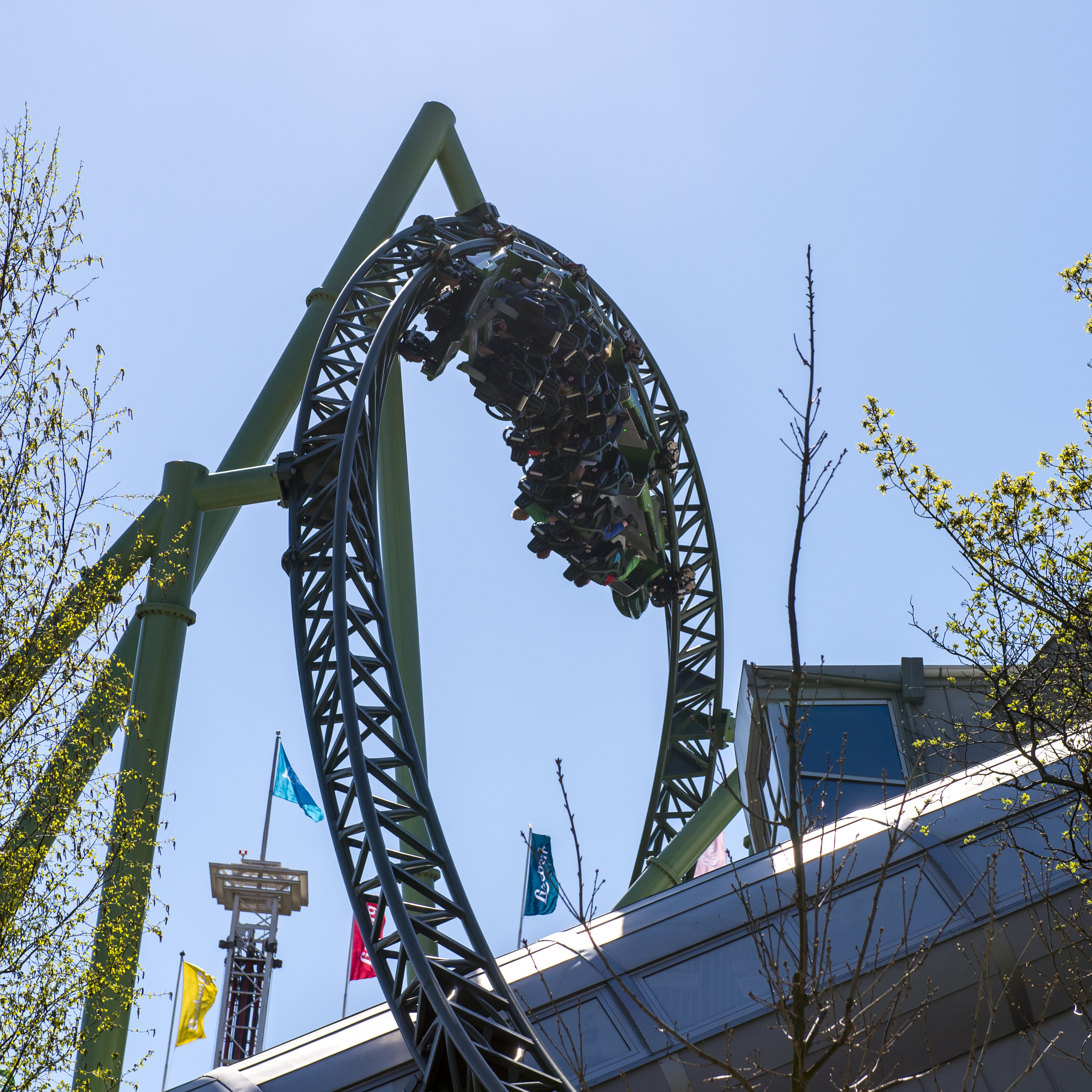

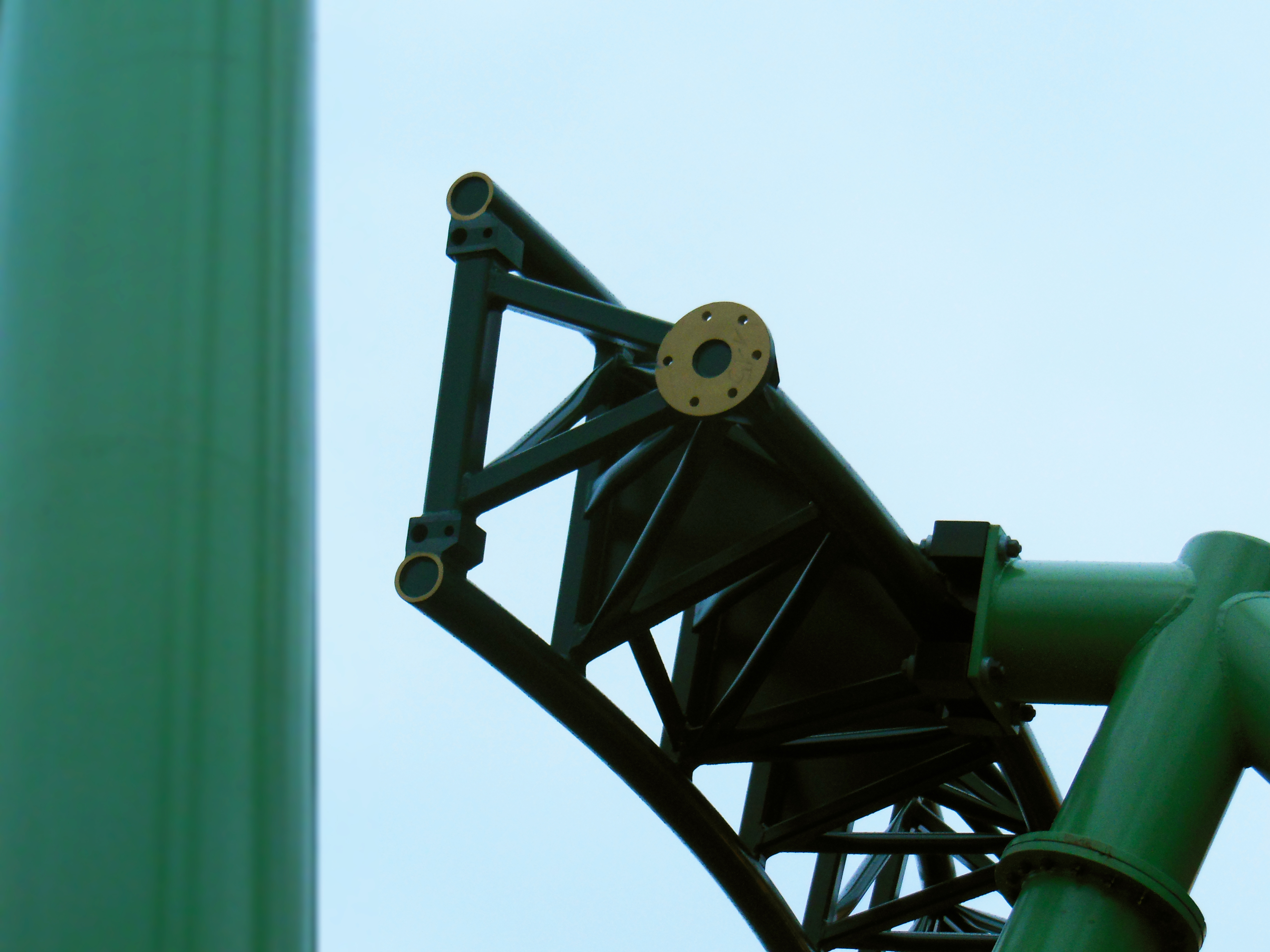
Helix under construction in December 2013

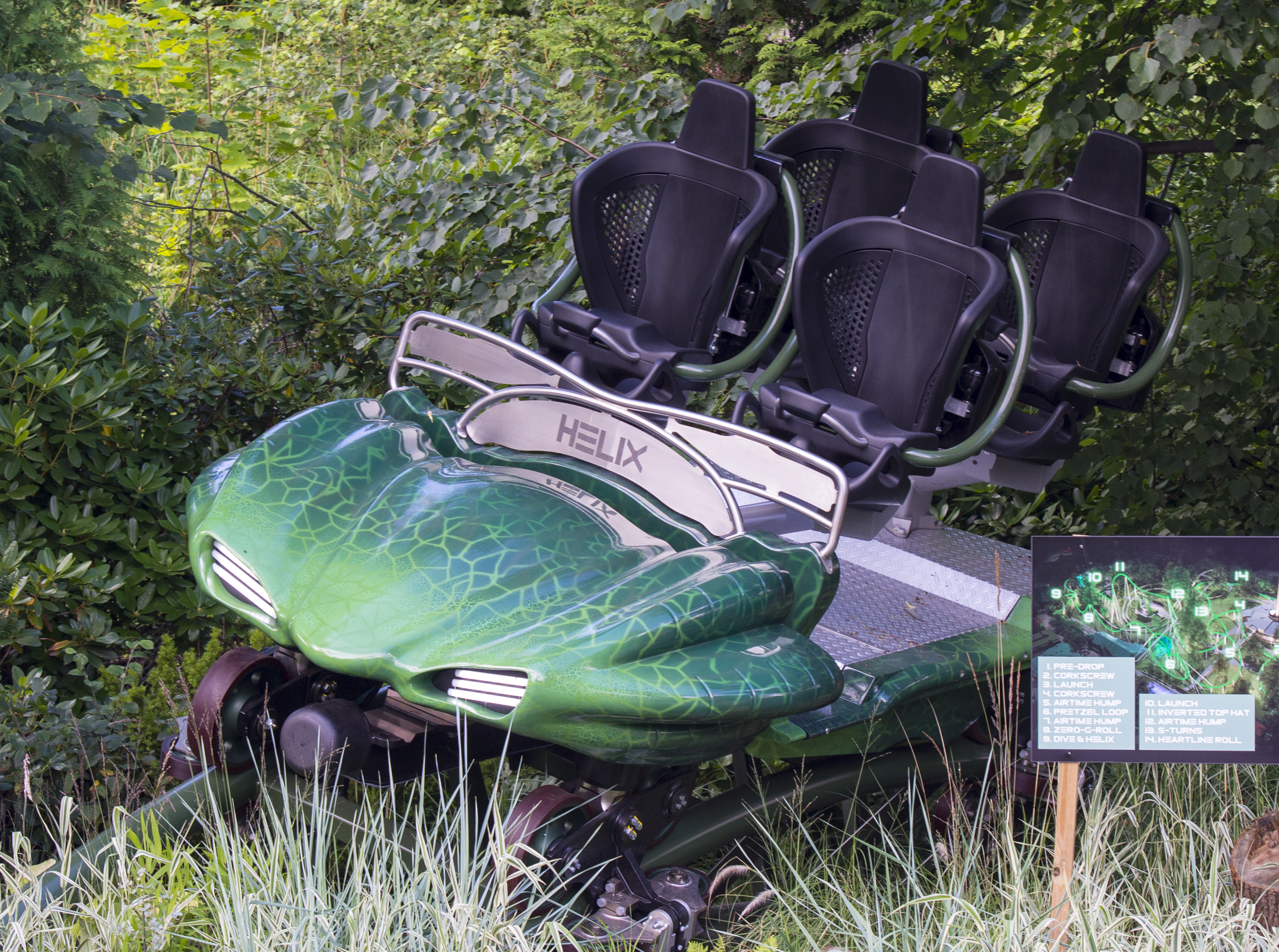
