= Matugani =

Roller coaster at Lost Island Theme Park

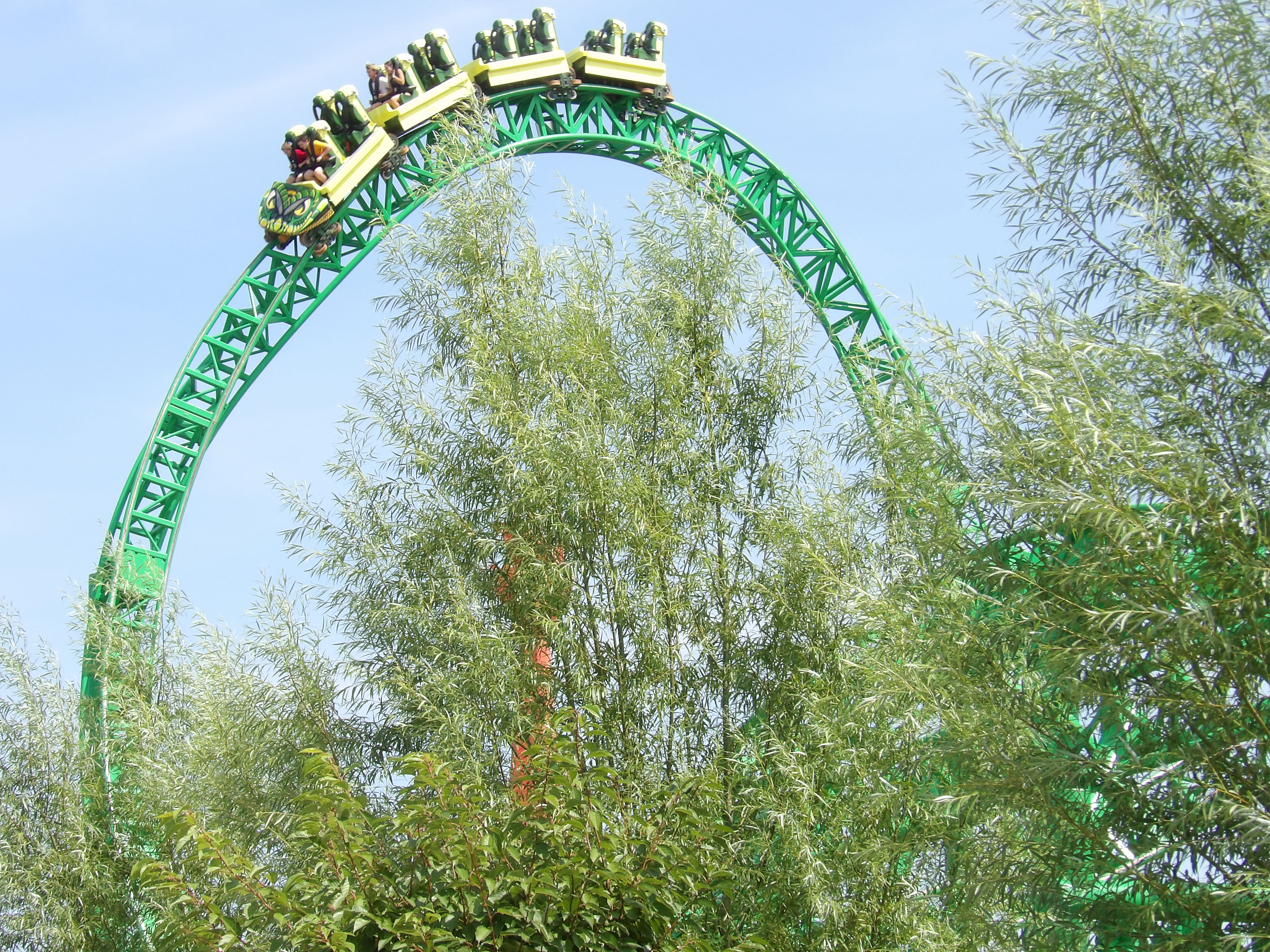

Lost Island Theme Park
- Park section: Yuta Earth Tribe
- Coordinates: 42°26′19.33″N 92°18′32.79″W
- Status: Operating
- Opening date: May 20, 2023

Liseberg
- Name: Kanonen
- Coordinates: 57°41′35.76″N 11°59′43.49″E
- Status: Removed
- Opening date: April 23, 2005
- Closing date: December 30, 2016
- Cost: 50,000,000 SEK
- Replaced by: Valkyria

General statistics
- Type: Steel – Launched
- Manufacturer: Intamin
- Designer: Werner Stengel
- Model: Accelerator Coaster
- Lift/launch system: Hydraulic Launch
- Height: 79 ft (24 m)
- Length: 1,444 ft (440 m)
- Speed: 47 mph (76 km/h)
- Inversions: 2
- Duration: 1 min 13 sec
- Max vertical angle: 90°
- Capacity: 930 riders per hour
- Acceleration: 0 to 47 mph in 2 seconds
- Height restriction: 52 in (132 cm)
- Trains: 2 trains with 4 cars. Riders are arranged 2 across in 2 rows for a total of 16 riders per train.
- Matugani at RCDB

Video
- A video of the ride at Liseberg.

Matugani is a steel accelerator roller coaster located at Lost Island Theme Park in Waterloo, Iowa, United States. Manufactured by Intamin, it originally opened at Liseberg amusement park in Gothenburg, Sweden, in 2005 as Kanonen ("the cannon"). The ride features a hydraulic launch and two inversions. The coaster was built with a tightly packed layout because of the limited area that was available at Liseberg. On December 30, 2016, Kanonen closed permanently at Liseberg, and was relocated to Lost Island Theme Park to make room for the park's new ride Valkyria, a Bolliger & Mabillard dive coaster. The coaster was dismantled and sold in 2018 to Lost Island Water Park, where it reopened in 2023.

== History ==
=== Liseberg ===
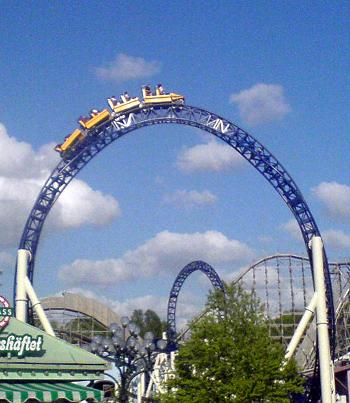
Matugani as it operated at Liseberg as Kanonen

In 2002, Liseberg's only looping roller coaster HangOver, a Vekoma Invertigo model, was removed. The park contacted several roller coaster manufacturers with the aim of introducing a new looping ride, with the winning bid coming from Swiss company Intamin. Lars-Erik Hedin, technical director of Liseberg said "Due to the good experiences with Balder and the impressive catapult launch we decided to mandate Intamin again with the project".

In 2016, Liseberg announced that Kanonen would close to be replaced by a B&M dive coaster called Valkyria in 2018. December 30, 2016 was Kanonen's last day, it was then dismantled and sold afterwards.

=== Lost Island Theme Park ===
On July 19, 2018, the roller coaster was sold to Lost Island Water Park located in Waterloo, Iowa. It was planned to be included within a theme park expansion of the complex that was planned to open in 2022 and was initially set to be placed on the park's lake shore before soil stability concerns resulted in it trading places with the Yuta Falls flume ride. Located in the Yuta Earth Tribe realm, the coaster was renamed Matugani, with a green track repaint and snake themed trains. Matugani did not open with the rest of the park in June 2022, as the new brake motor parts were delayed by supply chain issues.

Within the attraction's backstory, Matugani is a giant emerald serpent that prowled the jungle of the Yuta Realm and was considered a menace until it rescued the Yuta people when their civilization became trapped in their mines in a landslide by guiding them back to the surface through one of their burrows. This act lead the Yuta to begin living in balance with nature and Matugani was celebrated as a wise protector. The coaster's station is themed as the Yuta's former mining headquarters, now converted into a temple to honor Matugani.

== Track layout ==
After departing the station, Matugani's 16-person trains are accelerated to 72 km/h straight into a 24 metres (78.7 ft) high top hat element. This is immediately followed by an air time hill and a 20 metres (65.6 ft) high vertical loop, the first inversion of the ride. After a highly banked turnaround, the trains pass through a heartline roll before entering the brake run, bringing the ride to an end.

== Rollbacks ==
On June 8, 2009, a train got balanced at the top of the top-hat with 14 riders on board.
