= Valkyria (roller coaster) =

Roller coaster

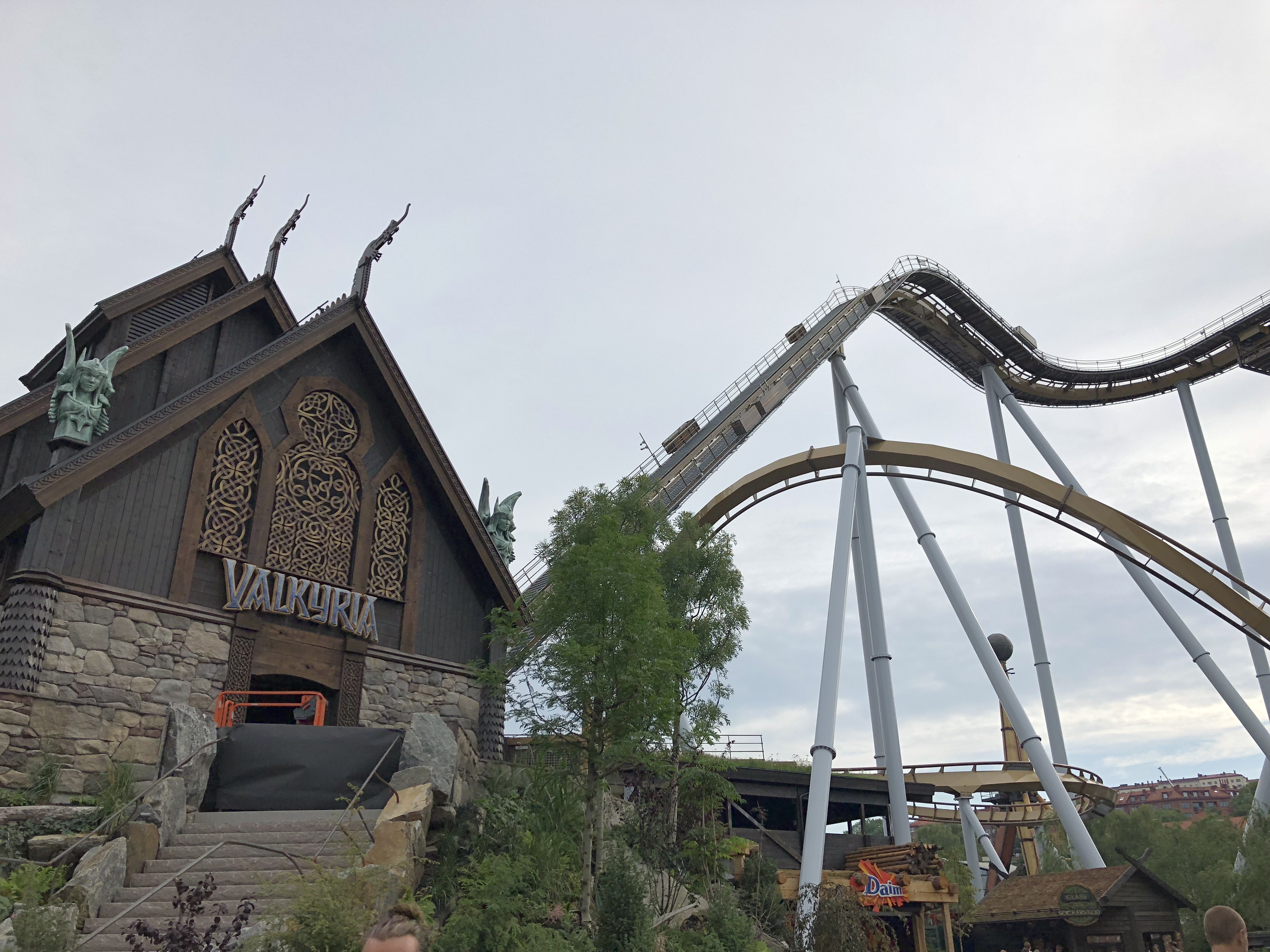
- View of the station and lift hill of Valkyria

Liseberg
- Location: Liseberg
- Coordinates: 57.6932°N 11.9953°E
- Status: Operating
- Opening date: 10 August 2018
- Replaced: Kanonen

General statistics
- Type: Steel – Dive Coaster
- Manufacturer: Bolliger & Mabillard
- Model: Dive Coaster
- Height: 154.2 ft (47.0 m)
- Drop: 164 ft (50 m)
- Length: 2,296.6 ft (700.0 m)
- Speed: 65.2 mph (104.9 km/h)
- Inversions: 3
- Capacity: 1,100 riders per hour
- Height restriction: 132 cm (4 ft 4 in)
- Trains: 3 trains with 3 cars. Riders are arranged 6 across in a single row for a total of 18 riders per train.
- Theme: Valkyrie
- Website: Official website
- Valkyria at RCDB

Valkyria is a steel Dive Coaster manufactured by Bolliger & Mabillard operating at Liseberg amusement park in Gothenburg, Sweden. Opened on 10 August 2018, it is Europe's longest and tallest Dive Coaster. The name Valkyria is derived from the Norse mythology creature Valkyrie, a mythological creature that brought fallen warriors to the afterlife.

== History ==
In the days leading towards the announcement of the investment project starting on September 21, 2016, Liseberg released multiple trailers for upcoming news to the park in 2017. Less than a week later on 27 September 2016, Liseberg announced the construction of two new attractions, including Valkyria, for the 2017 and 2018 seasons.

The ride's simulated POV was released on 13 April 2017, along with the announcement that construction on the ride's station had begun where Kanonen was located. Furthermore, the park announced that it would host a virtual reality (VR) experience for the ride later in 2017 season. The construction of Valkyria is part of a 250 million SEK investment of the park that will be constructed along with Loke, a Gyro Swing manufactured by Intamin, both being in the theme of Norse mythology.

In January/February 2018, vertical construction of the track began after a year of foundation work was completed for the roller coasters' layout. The ride was intended to open in April 2018, however, due to problems with building the tunnel that had previously arose, the ride was delayed until August. On 10 August 2018, Valkyria opened to the public.

== Ride experience ==
Upon dispatching from the station, the train immediately begins its ascent up the 154.2-foot (47.0 m) tall lift hill. At the top, the train makes a 90° right-hand turn and engages with the holding chain at the drop. After halting for a few seconds, the train is released into its signature 164-foot (50 m) drop into a tunnel, and immediately pulls up into an immelmann inversion. It crosses over the canal into a banked turn and a zero-g roll. A clockwise turnaround helix and a brief dip leads to the final inversion, a lengthened heartline roll, whereas a final right hand turn leads into the final brake run. A final left-hand 180° leads back into the station.

== See also ==
- 2018 in amusement parks
