= Showboat Atlantic City =

Hotel and casino in Atlantic City, New Jersey

Coordinates: 39°21′42″N 74°25′5″W

Showboat Resort Atlantic City
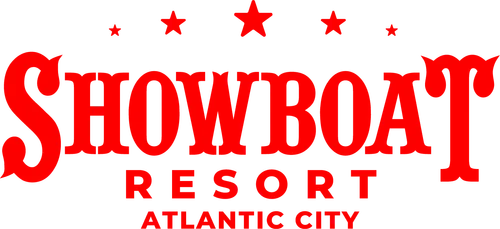

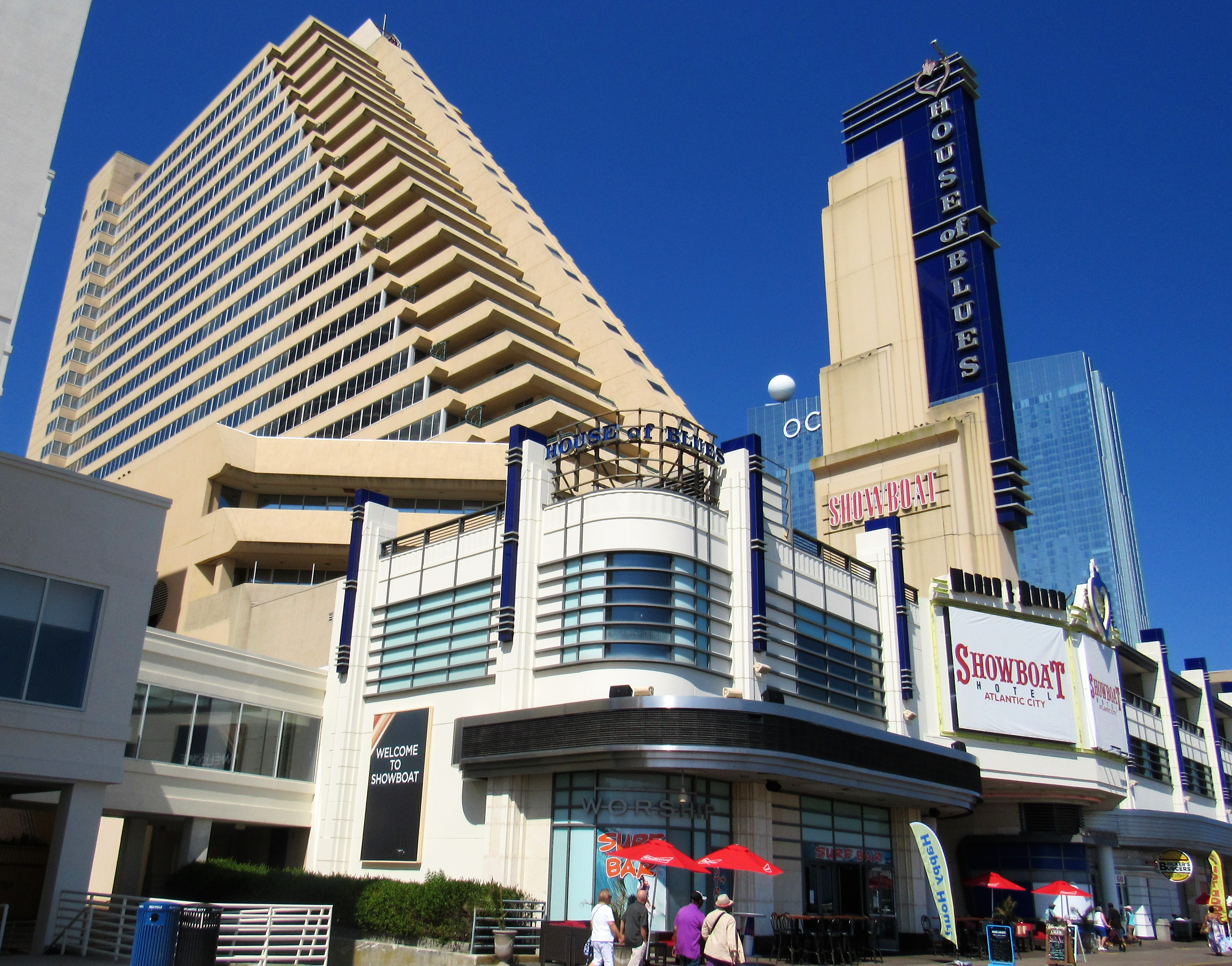
- View of Showboat from the boardwalk (2018)
- Former names: Showboat Atlantic City Showboat Hotel & Casino Atlantic City

General information
- Location: Atlantic City, New Jersey, 801 Boardwalk
- Opening: March 30, 1987 (as casino/hotel); July 8, 2016 (as hotel only)
- Renovated: 2003, 2007, 2016, 2021-2022
- Closed: August 31, 2014 (as casino/hotel)
- Owner: Bart Blatstein

Other information
- Number of rooms: 1,331

Website
- showboathotelac.com
- Showboat Atlantic City
- Theme: New Orleans; Mardi Gras
- Gaming space: 127,978 sq ft (11,889.5 m^{2})
- Casino type: Land-based

The Showboat Resort Atlantic City is a resort hotel and former casino in Atlantic City, New Jersey. The Showboat opened as a casino hotel in 1987 and closed in 2014; the hotel reopened in 2016. It is owned by developer Bart Blatstein.

It is home to the Island Waterpark at Showboat, and the largest arcade in New Jersey, as well as the Residences at Showboat Apartments offering fully furnished and unfurnished apartment rentals in the Premier Lite Tower.

== History ==
On March 30, 1987, the Showboat Hotel, Casino and Bowling Center opened with a 60,000-square-foot (5,600 m^{2}) casino and a 60-lane bowling alley. The complex was built on land leased from Resorts International, just north of the under-construction Resorts Taj Mahal (which became the Trump Taj Mahal upon opening in 1990, now the Hard Rock Hotel & Casino Atlantic City). The grand opening ceremony featured Bob Hope and Al Hirt.

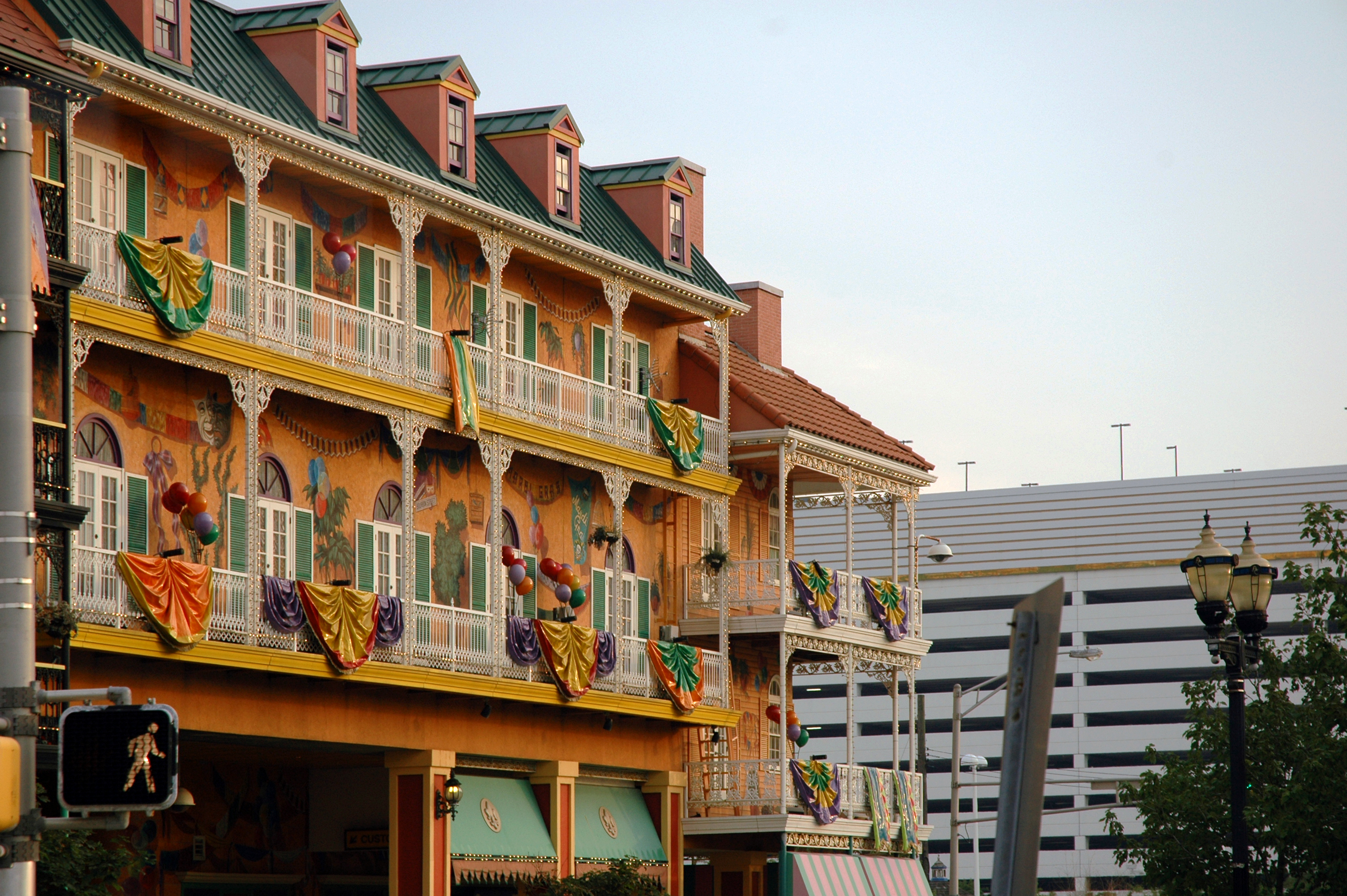
Mardi Gras-themed facade on Pacific Avenue.

The Showboat opened the city's first racebook in 1993, following the legalization in 1990 of casino simulcast wagering. Steelman Partners completed a major renovation in 1995, creating a Mardi Gras theme.

In 1998, the property's parent company, Showboat, Inc., was purchased by Harrah's Entertainment, later known as Caesars Entertainment.

With the popularity of bowling on the decline, the bowling alley was closed in 2001, and the space was used for a new buffet and a coffee shop.

In May 2003, the Showboat added a 544-room, $90 million hotel tower called the Orleans Tower. In 2007, the hotel remodeled its original tower, the Bourbon Tower.

In June 2014, Caesars Entertainment announced the planned closure of the Showboat, even though the property was profitable. The move was made in an effort to stabilize Caesars's other Atlantic City casinos. After a buyer could not be found, the Showboat closed on August 31, 2014, at 4:00 p.m. It employed 2,100 people, but 470 of them were immediately hired at other Caesars casinos. The shutdown came amid a wave of closures of Atlantic City properties, with four of the city's casinos closing in 2014.

On December 13, 2014, Richard Stockton College (later Stockton University) purchased the Showboat for $18 million, with plans to develop a full-service residential campus awarding undergraduate and graduate degrees and other professional training programs. The plan was derailed by legal issues, and Stockton sold the property to Philadelphia developer Bart Blatstein for $23 million in January 2016.

Blatstein announced in June 2016 that the Showboat would reopen the following month as a non-gaming hotel. The "new" Showboat Atlantic City Hotel opened July 8, accepting reservations and welcoming guests. The new hotel featured only one restaurant, bar and coffee shop. The former casino space and House of Blues areas were closed off and decorated with images of Atlantic City on makeshift walls. The casino floor space was subsequently used for various conventions and events.

In February 2018, Blatstein took a preliminary step toward applying for a casino license for the property. Blatstein said "There is over a billion dollars worth of investment in that part of the town that should not be ignored," referring to the reopening of two shuttered casinos next to the Showboat, the Ocean Resort Casino and Hard Rock Hotel & Casino. Later that year, Blatstein also announced plans to convert 264 of the Showboat's hotel rooms into apartments. In early 2019, Bart Blatstein was approved to apply for a casino license. Blatstein planned to build a new casino in the lot in between Showboat and Ocean Casino Resort. Due to a deed restriction placed on Showboat by Caesars Entertainment, the building may not be used as a casino, so building a new building was a way around it. The new casino was expected to break ground in 2020.

However, in December 2020, the New Jersey Casino Reinvestment Development Authority approved Blatstein's request for financial assistance to turn the space originally intended for a casino into a $100 million indoor water park. Blatstein also sought to have the park designated as an entertainment retail district project, allowing the park to qualify for up to $2.5 million in annual sales tax breaks for 20 years. In May 2021, Showboat opened the Lucky Snake Arcade and Sports Bar, which took over most of the empty casino floor space, giving Showboat a permanent non-casino attraction. It is New Jersey's largest arcade with over 100 games and attractions such as video games, bowling, skee-ball, pinball and other games. The area also features a sports bar with large screens and a full-size boxing ring. In addition, Raceway at the Lucky Snake, an indoor electric go-kart track was opened on May 28th, 2022. About a year later, the Island Waterpark opened on July 4, 2023. It is the largest beachfront indoor water park in the world with 11 waterslides, a lazy river, surf simulator and various other play areas.

== Dining ==
=== Current restaurants ===
- Island bar
- 12 Bar
- Bricker's Burgers & More (Seasonal)
- ACE - Atlantic City Eatery (Burgers, Pizza, Fries, Salads, Pasta)
- Limonada (Breakfast and Mexican)

=== Former restaurants ===
- Atlantic City Eatery
- Casa di Napoli
- Crossroads
- Earl of Sandwich
- Foundation Room Dining
- French Quarter Buffet
- House of Blues
- Johnny Rockets
- Royal Noodle House
- Scarduzio's Steak - Sushi - Lounge
- Sundeck Coffee Shop
- Starbucks Coffee
- Worship Surf Bar

== Amenities ==
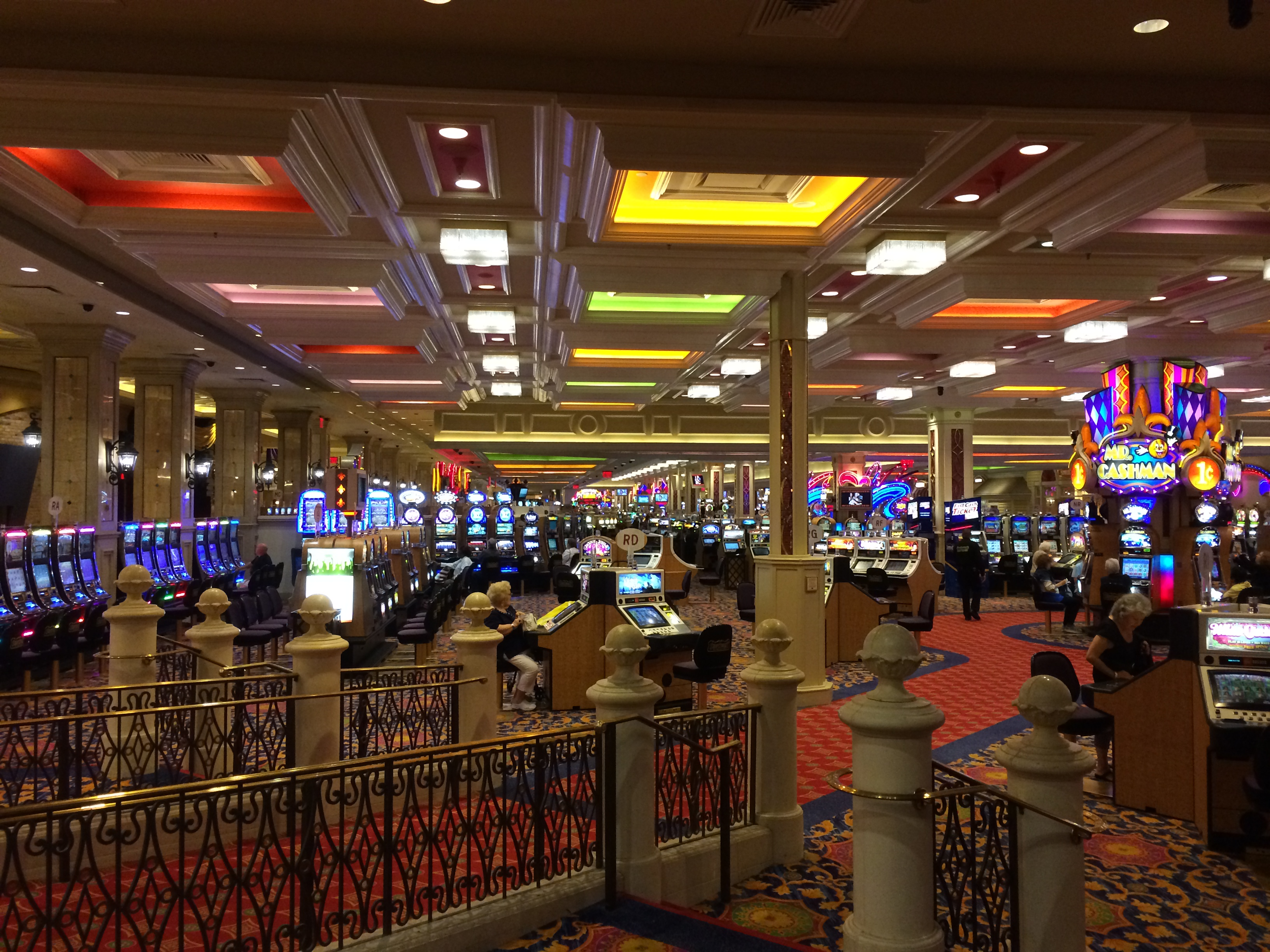
Former Showboat Gaming Floor. This is where the Lucky Snake arcade is now located.

Showboat has a 3,500 sq.ft. spa, a fitness center, a pool and two gift shops. Prior to the addition to the former House of Blues, shows were performed in two venues, either the Mardi Gras Showroom or Mississippi Pavilion. Bob Hope was the first headliner at the resort. Other headliners included Phyllis Diller, Charo, The Judds, Ray Charles, The Spinners, Jack Jones, Alan King and Willie Nelson. Smaller Las Vegas-style revue shows were also sporadically booked in the Mardi Gras Showroom. The opening of The House of Blues in 2005 saw the entertainment bookings ranging from Cyndi Lauper to Elvis Costello to the White Stripes to Erykah Badu. Boxing matches are occasionally held at the hotel.

Upon the reopening of the Showboat, the hotel rebranded the former House of Blues as the Bourbon Room which rarely hosts concerts and other events. The hotel also introduced a video arcade called Starcade and a glow-in-the-dark miniature golf course sponsored by Glow Golf However, both the Starcade and Glow Golf establishments have closed, being replaced by the much larger Lucky Snake Arcade & Sports Bar in 2021.

== See also ==
- Gambling in New Jersey
- List of tallest buildings in Atlantic City
