= Lost Island Theme Park =

Theme park in Waterloo, Iowa

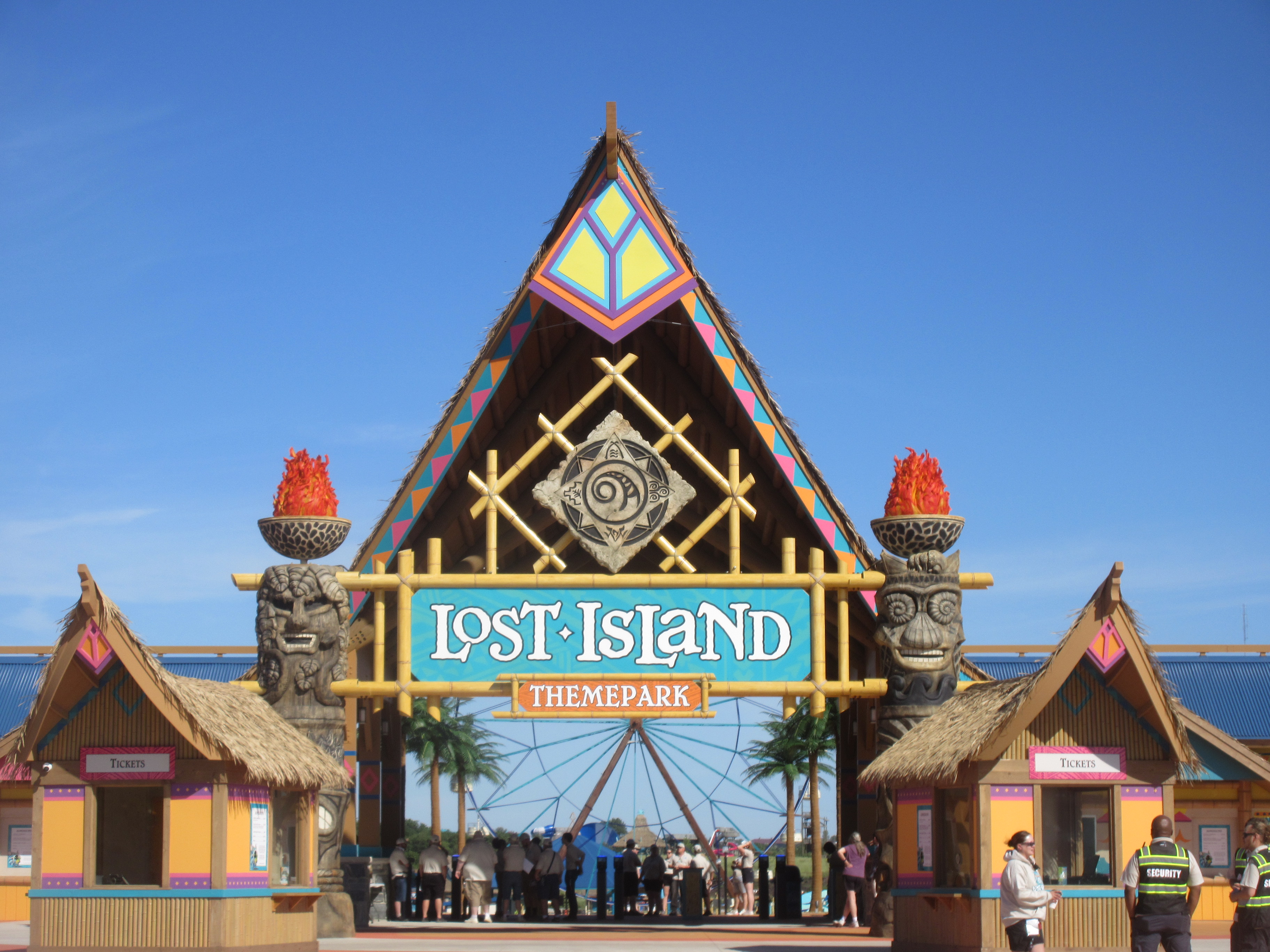
- Park entrance gate
- Interactive map of Lost Island Theme Park
- Location: Waterloo, Iowa, United States
- Coordinates: 42.440575°N 92.307470°W
- Status: Operating
- Opened: June 18, 2022
- Owner: The Bertch Family
- Operated by: Lost Island Waterpark
- Theme: Enchanted tropical island, classical elements
- Area: 90 acres (0.36 km^{2})

Attractions
- Total: 26
- Roller coasters: 4
- Water rides: 2
- Other rides: 20
- Website: Official website

Lost Island Theme Park is a theme park in Waterloo, Iowa. The 90-acre (36 ha) park includes five themed lands, which feature numerous attractions; including three roller coasters. Lost Island Theme Park is owned by the Bertch family, who operate the Lost Island Waterpark, which is located next to the site of the theme park. Construction on Lost Island Theme Park began in August 2019, it opened on June 18, 2022, and it cost an estimated $100 million.

== History ==
=== Planning and construction ===
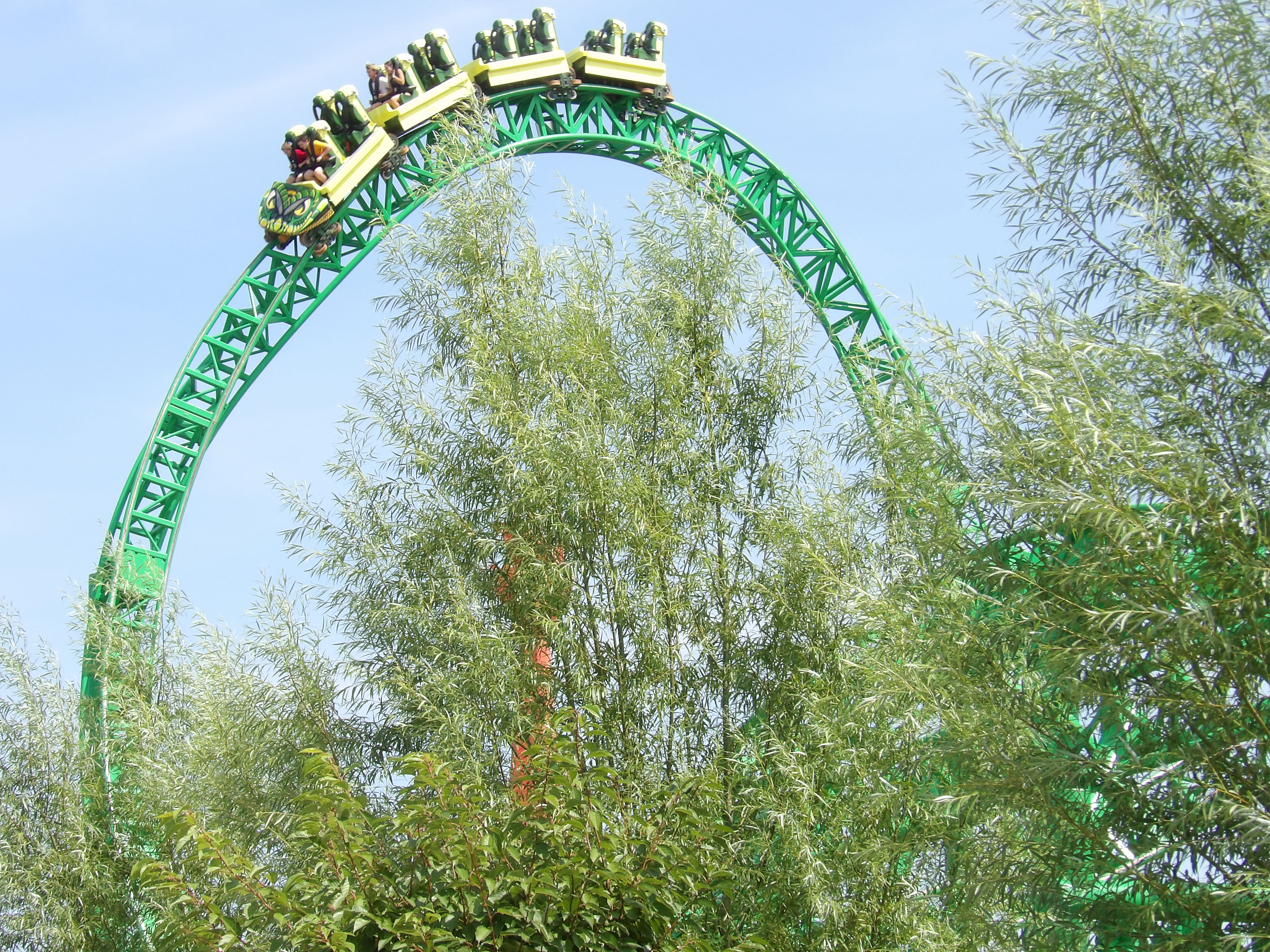
Matugani, an Intamin accelerator coaster which formerly operated at Liseberg as Kanonen, was relocated to Lost Island Theme Park

In 2001, Bertch Cabinet Manufacturing (owned by the Bertch family) opened Lost Island Waterpark. Over its 20+ years in operation, the waterpark has gradually expanded, consistently ranking among the top water parks on the continent.

Planning for a theme park began in 2016, with a tropical, “lost continents” or “ancient worlds” theme, with Atlantis and Zealandia being named as potential themed areas; soon, the creative team developed the concept of an original storyline for the park, wherein the entire setting is a fictional, enchanted island called ‘Auk Modu’ (in the park's constructed language of Aukipi) consisting of five realms themed around the classical elements and the spirits that maintain balance between them.

On July 15, 2019, the Bertch family announced plans to construct Lost Island Theme Park next to Lost Island Waterpark. The planned 90-acre (36 ha) park would be located next to a 30-acre (12 ha) lake, and it would feature multiple attractions in five themed lands. The park will feature three roller coasters: the Nopuko Air Coaster, a Suspended Looping Coaster (which had operated at Ratanga Junction in South Africa as Cobra); Matugani, an Intamin Accelerator Coaster (formerly Kanonen, at Liseberg Park in Sweden); and an SBF/Visa junior Wacky Worm coaster named Lokolo. Construction on Lost Island Theme Park began on August 23, 2019, and was completed in 2022.

Lost Island Theme Park gradually began to unveil ride names and details on their website throughout the summer and fall of 2021. The park's Volkanu: Quest for the Golden Idol dark ride was formally announced during a press conference at the annual IAAPA Expo in Orlando, Florida. The park purchased a variety of new and used rides alike from a handful of manufacturers, including Zamperla, SBF Visa Group, Moser's Rides, Gerstlauer, and Interlink.

On March 10, 2022, a fire destroyed the queue building, loading station and control system for Yuta Falls, an Interlink log flume ride.

=== First season ===
The park ended its first season earlier than originally scheduled due to lack of attendance and staffing issues. The delays with Matugani and Yuta Falls have been cited as a likely leading factor in the underwhelming attendance figures. Additionally, the Nika's Gift carousel would be pushed back into the 2025 season from manufacturer and part delays.

=== Expansions ===
In 2024, Lost Island announced that it would add Fire Runner, a single-rail roller coaster by Rocky Mountain Construction, for the 2025 season.

In 2026 Lost Island announced that Forbidden Lair a new family shuttle coaster that would be the first Wild Moose coaster produced by Rocky Mountain Construction would debut for the 2027 season.

== Areas ==
=== Tamariki Spirit Realm ===
Home to the park's attractions for kids, this realm is the domain of the Tamariki, small mischievous spirits that maintain the balance of the four elements on the Lost Island.

- Kapulele Gliders - Zamperla Magic Bikes
- Mama Pezaki - Zamperla Crazy Bus
- Mura Dancer - Zamperla Pounce N' Bounce
- Ohu Hoppers - Zamperla Jump Around
- Golapa Sprouts - Zamperla Samba Tower
- Lokolo - SBF Visa Wacky Worm
- Tuka Tumbler - Zamperla Mini Ferris Wheel

=== Udara Air Realm ===
Home of the Udara Air Kingdom, a colony of steampunk-styled inventors who build things that harness the power of air with the goal of rebuilding a floating city that once hovered over the rest of the island.

- Amara Aviators - Gerstlauer Sky Fly
- Skyborne - S&S Turbo Drop
- Dream Spinner - Zamperla Midi Family Swinger
- Nopuko Air Coaster - Vekoma SLC with Extended Helix

=== Awa Water Realm ===
Home of the Awa Water Nomads, who enjoy simple pleasures and adventure. Spread across the eastern shore of the park's lake and the park's central island.

- Alzanu's Eye - SBF Visa Ferris Wheel
- Eeki Eeki Escape - Zierer Flying Gondolas
- Sea Swell - SBF Visa Swinging Pirate Ship
- Awaati Water Battle - Interlink Splash Battle
- Wakani Whirl - Zamperla Mini Tea Cups
- Zulawa Wave - Bertazzon Music Express
- Nika's Gift - Western Train Co. Carousel

=== Yuta Earth Realm ===
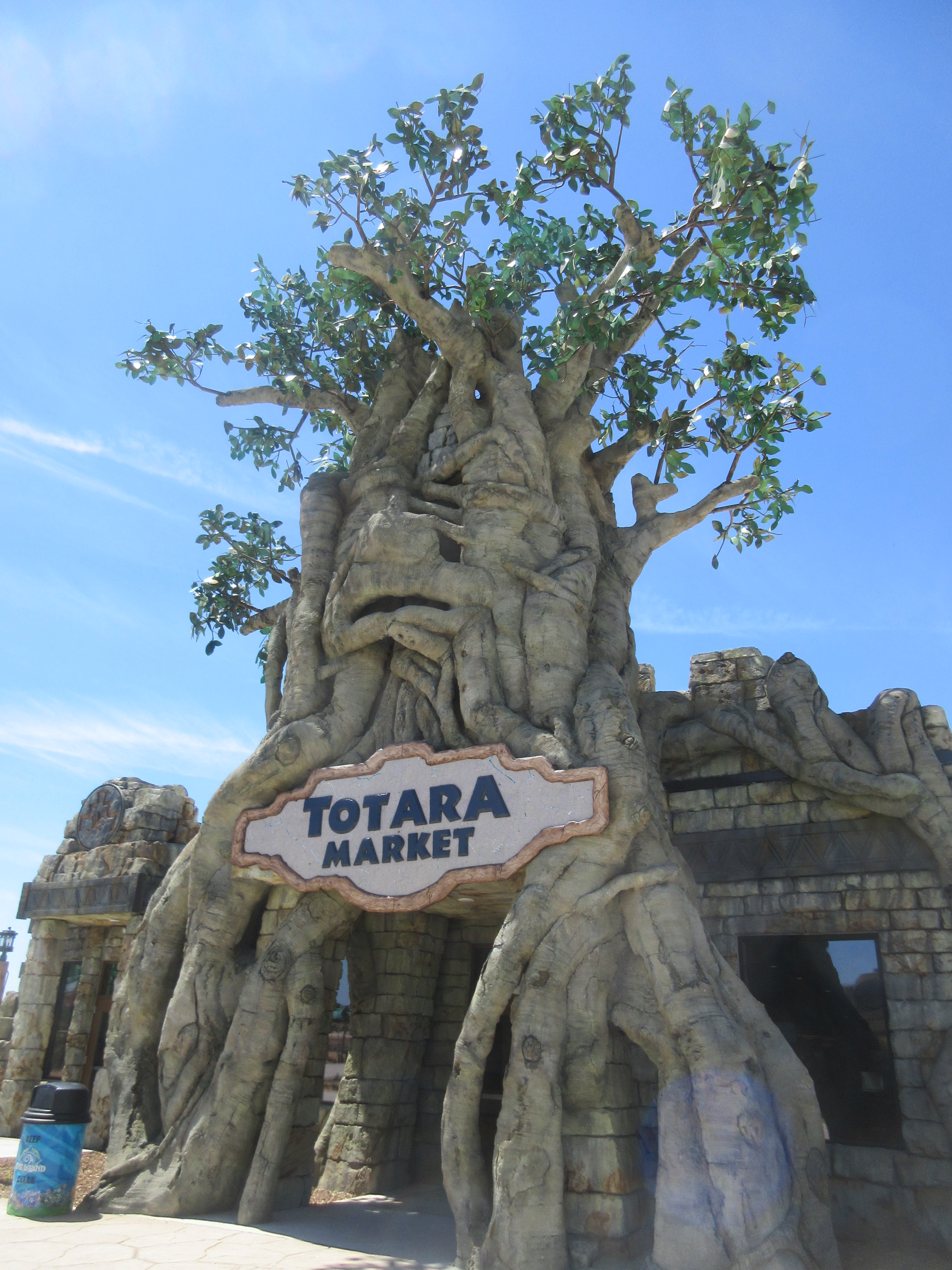
Entrance to the Totara Market restaurant at Lost Island Theme Park

Home of the Yuta Earth Tribe, who learned to live in balance with the forest and protect nature after their mining and logging efforts nearly collapsed their society. A giant ancient tree named Namua that rooted itself into a stone building serves as the entrance to one of the park's restaurants, the Totara Market.

- Matugani - Intamin Accelerator Coaster
- Yuta Falls - Interlink Super Flume
- Kukui Station - Spin Zone Bumper Cars
- Forbidden Lair - RMC Wild Moose shuttle coaster, set to open in 2027

=== Mura Fire Realm ===
A village built on the foothills of a volcano, this realm is home to the Mura Fire Clan, a spiritual sect of warriors and acrobats that protect the island from the malevolent fire demon Volkanu.

- Volkanu: Quest for the Golden Idol - Sally Corporation Dark Ride
- Shaman's Curse - Zamperla Disk'O Coaster
- Rokava - Moser's Rides Maverick Top Spin
- Mura Fury - Moser's Rides Sidewinder
- Fire Runner - RMC Raptor

== Food ==
Each realm of Lost Island has either a snack stand or a counter-service restaurant.

- Kotaki Treats - snack stand in the Mura realm serving Dole Whip and donuts.
- Thirsty Voyager - drink and snack stand in the Awa realm serving noodle bowls. In 2022, this was the only location in the park which serves adult beverages which included beer, seltzers and frozen cocktails.
- Totara Market - counter service indoor restaurant in the Yuta realm, serving burgers and pizza.
- Whalebone Grill - counter service indoor restaurant in the Awa realm, serving seafood and barbecue.
- Ummi Ummis - snack stand in the Tamariki realm.
- Udaran Delights - snack stand in the Udara realm, serving hot dogs and nachos.

== Mascots/Characters ==
The park's primary mascots are the Tamariki, the nature spirits that protect the balance of the four elements on the island. A walkaround character, Aoka, the Tamariki of Friendship, greets guests in the park's entry courtyard Ara Matua. Twelve Tamariki sculptures are distributed throughout the park and twenty named Tamariki appear as collectible avatars in the park's supplementary Lost Island Adventure Guide app alongside twenty four villagers (six for each of the four elemental realms).

In 2023, nine streetmosphere characters debuted in the park consisting of Dr. Marion Galavant, an anthropologist studying the island's cultures and two representatives for each of the four elemental realms pulled from the app. The Awa are represented by Chief Navigator Alzanu and his daughter Kiku, the Udara are represented by the musician Bardo and Professor Lumina, the Yuta are represented by the curiosa Tunika and the spice merchant Yamil, and the Mura are represented by the warriors Kolvak and Ula. This lineup has been altered in subsequent seasons with the fisherman Mu replacing Alzanu from 2024 to 2025, the shaman apprentice Vayla replacing Ula in 2025, and the pilot Avi replacing Lumina in 2026. Additionally, there is a puppet character in the form of Ziki the Yikyik, a horned fox-like creature found on the island who is generally handled by Dr. Galavant or Tunika. Besides roaming the park, the characters perform the "Lost Island Legend Ceremony" telling the backstory of the park in the mornings and late afternoon.
