= Balder (roller coaster) =

Wooden roller coaster at Liseberg

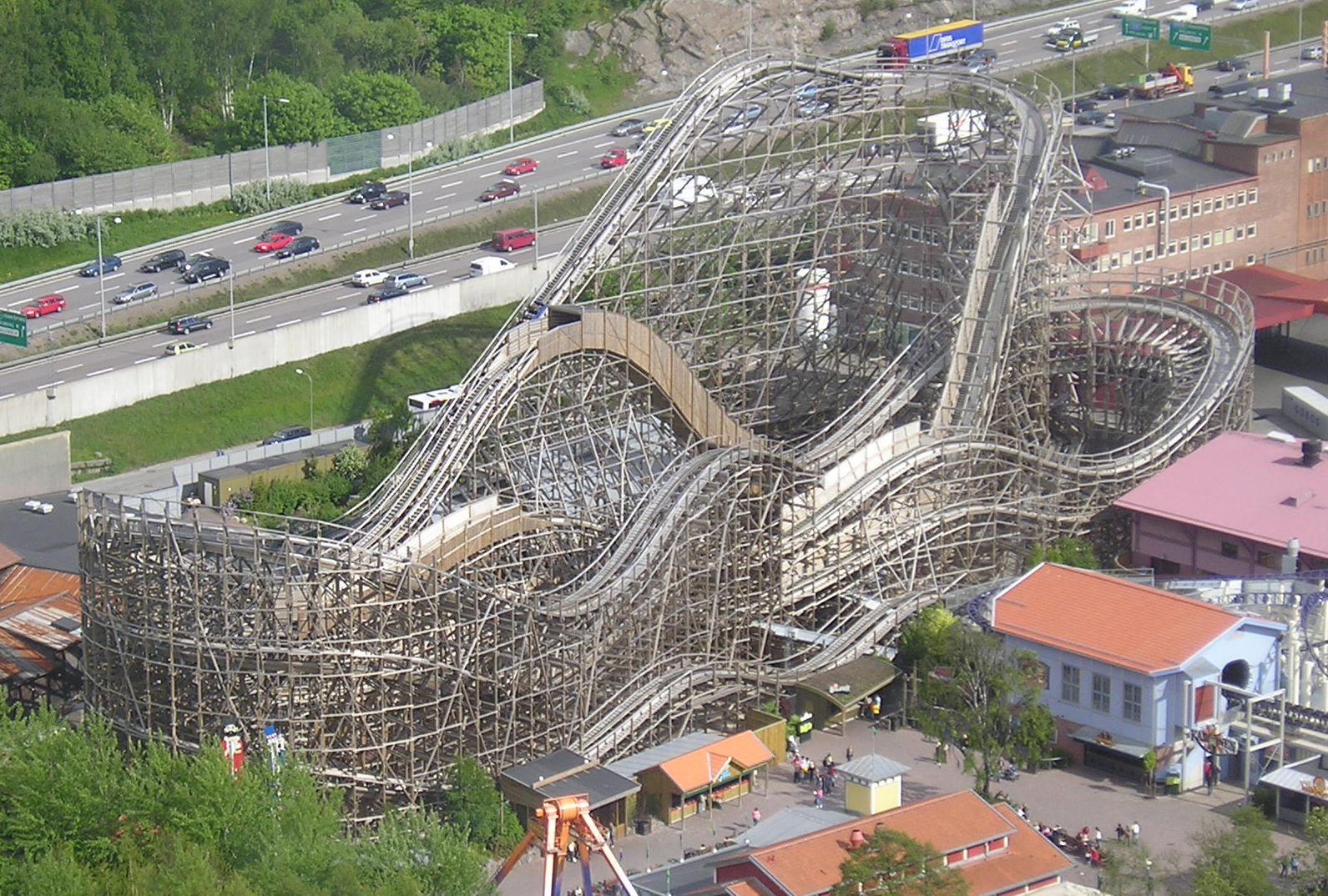
- View of Balder

Liseberg
- Location: Liseberg
- Coordinates: 57°41′36″N 11°59′46″E
- Status: Operating
- Opening date: 12 April 2003
- Cost: 100 million SEK (=approx. $12,6 million)

General statistics
- Type: Wood
- Manufacturer: Intamin
- Designer: Ingenieurbüro Stengel GmbH
- Model: Wooden Coaster (Prefabricated Track)
- Lift/launch system: 1 chain lift hill
- Height: 36 m (118 ft)
- Drop: 30.5 m (100 ft)
- Length: 1,070 m (3,510 ft)
- Speed: 90 km/h (56 mph)
- Inversions: 0
- Duration: 2:08
- Max vertical angle: 70°
- Capacity: 1,200 riders per hour
- Height restriction: 130 cm (4 ft 3 in)
- Trains: 2 trains with 5 cars; riders arranged 2 across in 3 rows for a total of 30 riders per train
- Balder at RCDB

Balder is a wooden roller coaster at the Liseberg amusement park in Gothenburg, Sweden. It opened in 2003 and was an instant success.

Balder is very different from a traditional wooden roller coaster because it is a prefabricated wooden roller coaster. This means that instead of trackers cutting, shaping, and laying down the track on site by hand, the track is laser cut in a factory. This means that the track is manufactured to a higher degree of precision than could ever be achieved by hand. The track is also made so that it snaps together like Lego pieces. The track also is made of more layers of wood that are tightly bonded together instead of nailed together by hand like a traditional wooden roller coaster. This has three major benefits, two being to the park and the other being to the riders.

The "Plug and Play" aspect of the coaster speeds construction of the coaster since track does not have to be completely manufactured on site. In addition, because of the speed of construction, the costs of building the coaster are lowered due to less man-hours spent on the construction. The riders benefit from a coaster, that while being wooden, is near steel smooth. However, some roller coaster enthusiasts may find that aspect to take away from the ride since it would not have the same character as a traditional wooden roller coaster. Balder is praised by many roller coaster enthusiasts around the world, and is said to be one of the best roller coasters in Europe. Three other prefabricated wooden roller coasters currently exist, Colossos at Heide Park, El Toro at Six Flags Great Adventure, and T Express in Everland. The restraints on Balder consist of an Intamin T-bar restraint system with a Click-Fix seatbelt.

== Awards ==
Golden Ticket Awards: Top wood Roller Coasters
Year									1998	1999
Ranking									–	–
Year	2000	2001	2002	2003	2004	2005	2006	2007	2008	2009
Ranking	–	–	–	–	23	21	27	15	15	21
Year	2010	2011	2012	2013	2014	2015	2016	2017	2018	2019
Ranking	21	13	10	13	10	11	12	16	14	13
Year	2020	2021	2022	2023	2024	2025	2026			
Ranking	N/A	16	18	11	13	13	13			
