= AtmosFear (Liseberg) =

Drop tower ride

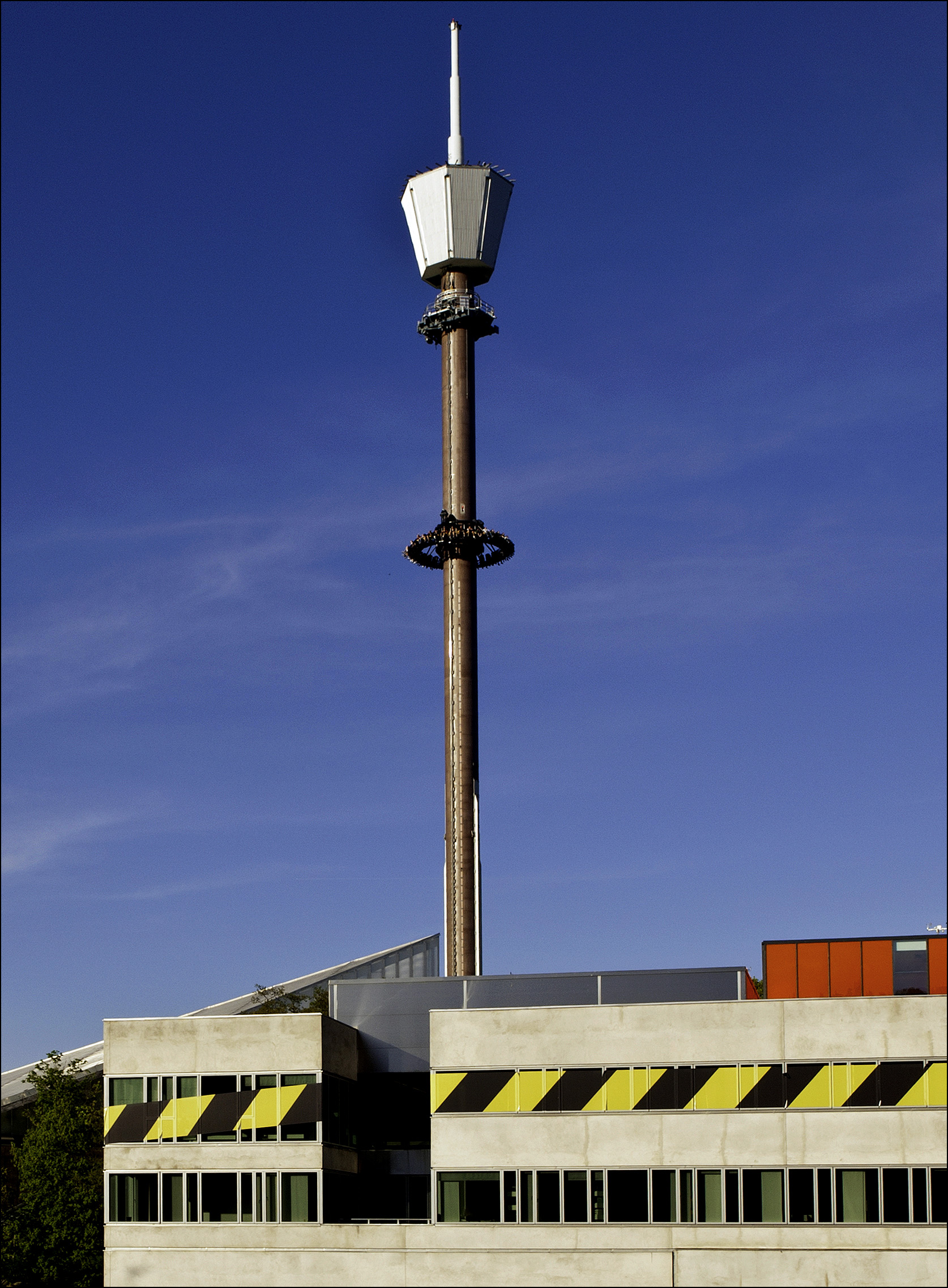

Liseberg
- Coordinates: 57°41′43.2″N 11°59′26.8″E
- Status: Operating
- Opening date: April 2011
- Replaced: Lisebergstornet

Ride statistics
- Attraction type: Drop tower
- Manufacturer: Intamin
- Height: 116 m (381 ft)
- Drop: 100 m (330 ft)
- Speed: 68 mph (109 km/h)
- G-force: 4
- Capacity: 600 riders per hour
- Height restriction: 140–195 cm (4 ft 7 in – 6 ft 5 in)

AtmosFear is a 116-metre-tall (381 ft) drop tower located in Liseberg amusement park in Gothenburg, Sweden, and is the second tallest drop tower in Europe, after Highlander at Hansa Park. AtmosFear is designed by Intamin and drops riders from a height of 100 metres (330 ft).

== History ==
In 1990, Liseberg built a 146-metre-tall (479 ft) observation tower named Lisebergstornet (The Liseberg Tower). After twenty years of operation, Liseberg closed the attraction and began to renovate the tower in May 2010. The tower became the main structure for AtmosFear which opened as the tallest drop tower in Europe in April 2011.

== Ride ==
After boarding the gondola, riders await in suspense as the catch mechanism lowers and hooks onto the gondola. Red warning lights begin to flash in the station area and the gondola is slowly hoisted skywards, with riders being subjected to a light spray of mist upon leaving the station structure.

After a slow ascent to the summit of the tower, riders are presented with views over Liseberg and the surrounding Gothenburg. After several seconds, the catch mechanism releases the gondola. Riders plummet up to speeds of 68 miles per hour (109 km/h), pulling up to 4 G's before coming to a controlled halt at the bottom of the tower.
