= Island Waterpark at Showboat =

Water park in Atlantic City, New Jersey, United States

- Interactive map of Island Waterpark at Showboat
- Slogan: "Mindblowing Fun!"
- Location: Showboat, Atlantic City, New Jersey
- Coordinates: 39.3614°N 74.4179°W
- Owner: Bart Blatstein
- Opened: July 4, 2023
- Operating season: Year-round
- Website: islandwaterparkac.com

The Island Waterpark at Showboat is an indoor water park and entertainment center located next to the Showboat Resort along the boardwalk in Atlantic City, New Jersey. The water park is the largest indoor beachfront water park in the world. The park features 11 slides, a surf simulator and nightlife entertainment, and covers 120,000 sq ft (11,000 m^{2}), holding more than 317,000 US gal (1,200,000 L; 264,000 imp gal) of water. There are four restaurants and three bars and a Boardwalk-themed area.

== Planning ==
Several years prior to the official opening, Bart Blatstein, a Philadelphian investor, developer, and owner of Tower Investments Inc, announced plans to build a waterpark in Atlantic City, in the Showboat Atlantic City complex, a former casino that shuttered in 2014 and reopened several years later as a hotel. The plan accelerated in late 2022 and by June 24, 2023, construction was complete and the first VIPs were allowed to tour the park. Day passes for the waterpark are $89 per person.
