= Liseberg =

Amusement park in Gothenburg, Sweden

- Liseberg's logo

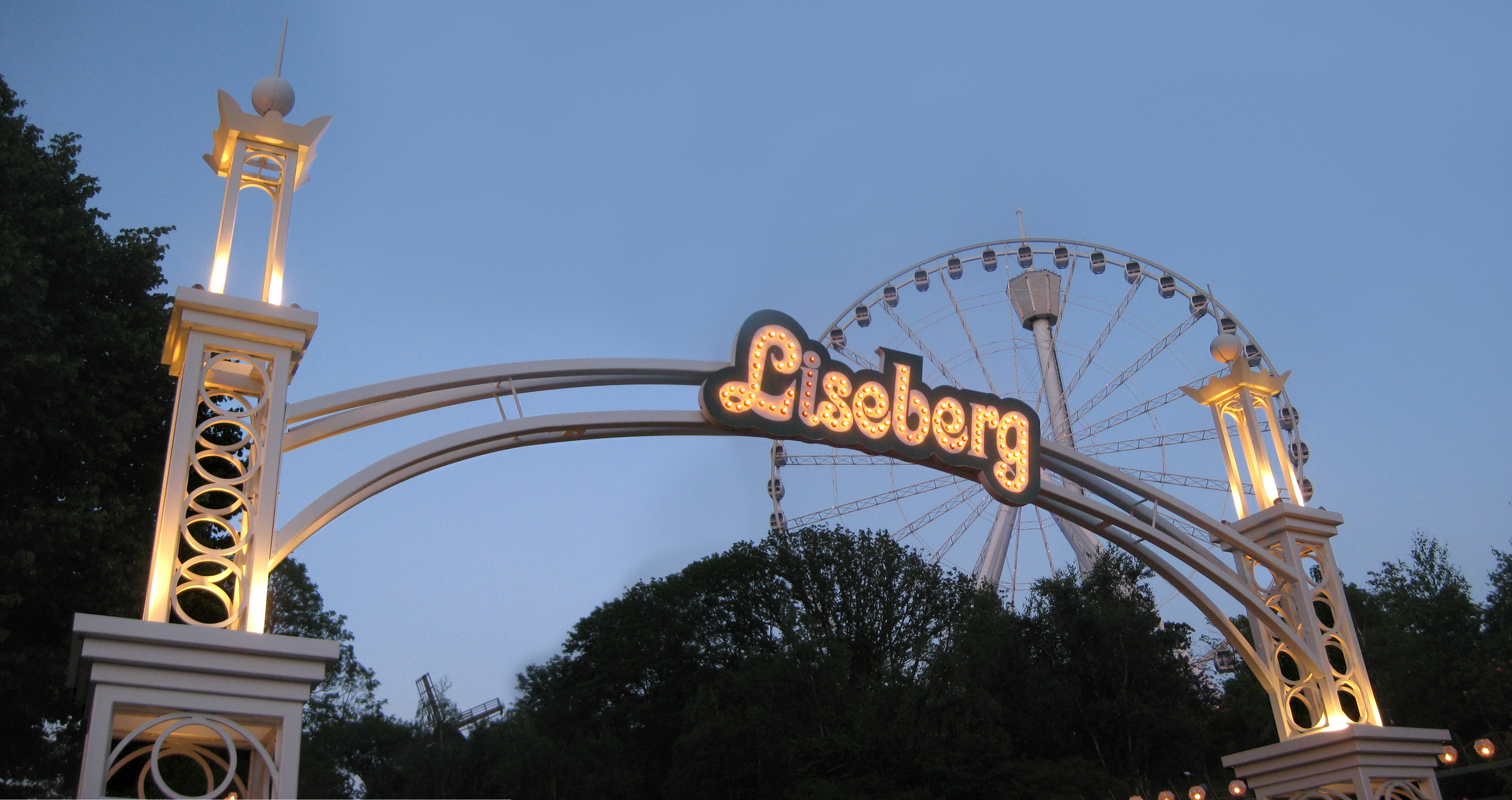
- Interactive map of Liseberg
- Location: Gothenburg, Sweden
- Coordinates: 57°41′44″N 11°59′24″E
- Opened: 8 May 1923
- Closed: Still operating
- Owner: Göteborgs stad
- Operated by: Liseberg AB
- General manager: Andreas Andersen
- Theme: Various different
- Operating season: April–December
- Attendance: 3,055,000 (2018); Halloween: 185,000 (2016); Christmas: 528,000 (2016)
- Area: 17 hectares (42 acres)

Attractions
- Total: 42
- Roller coasters: 7
- Water rides: 4
- Website: www.liseberg.se

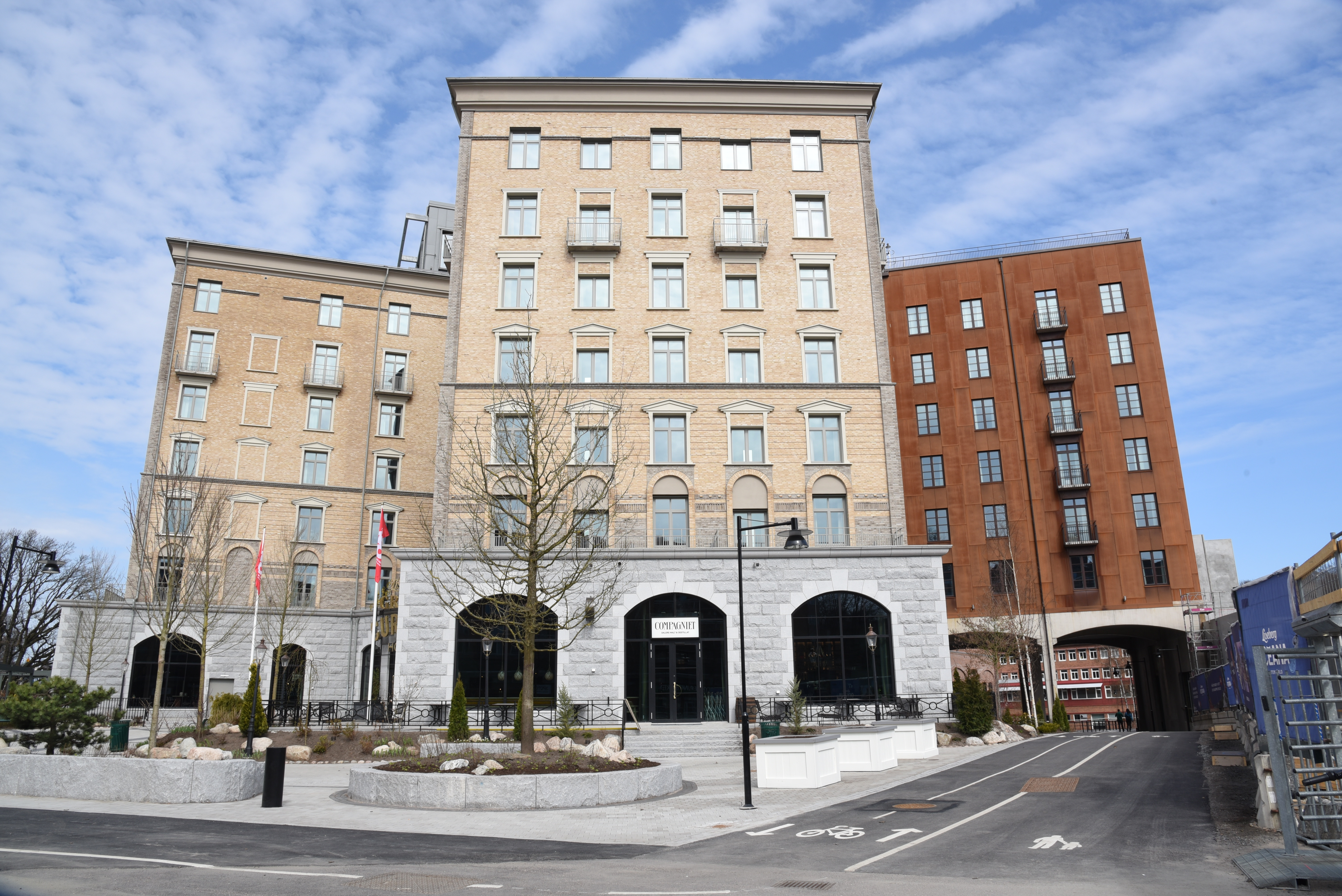
Liseberg Grand Curiosa Hotel, 2023

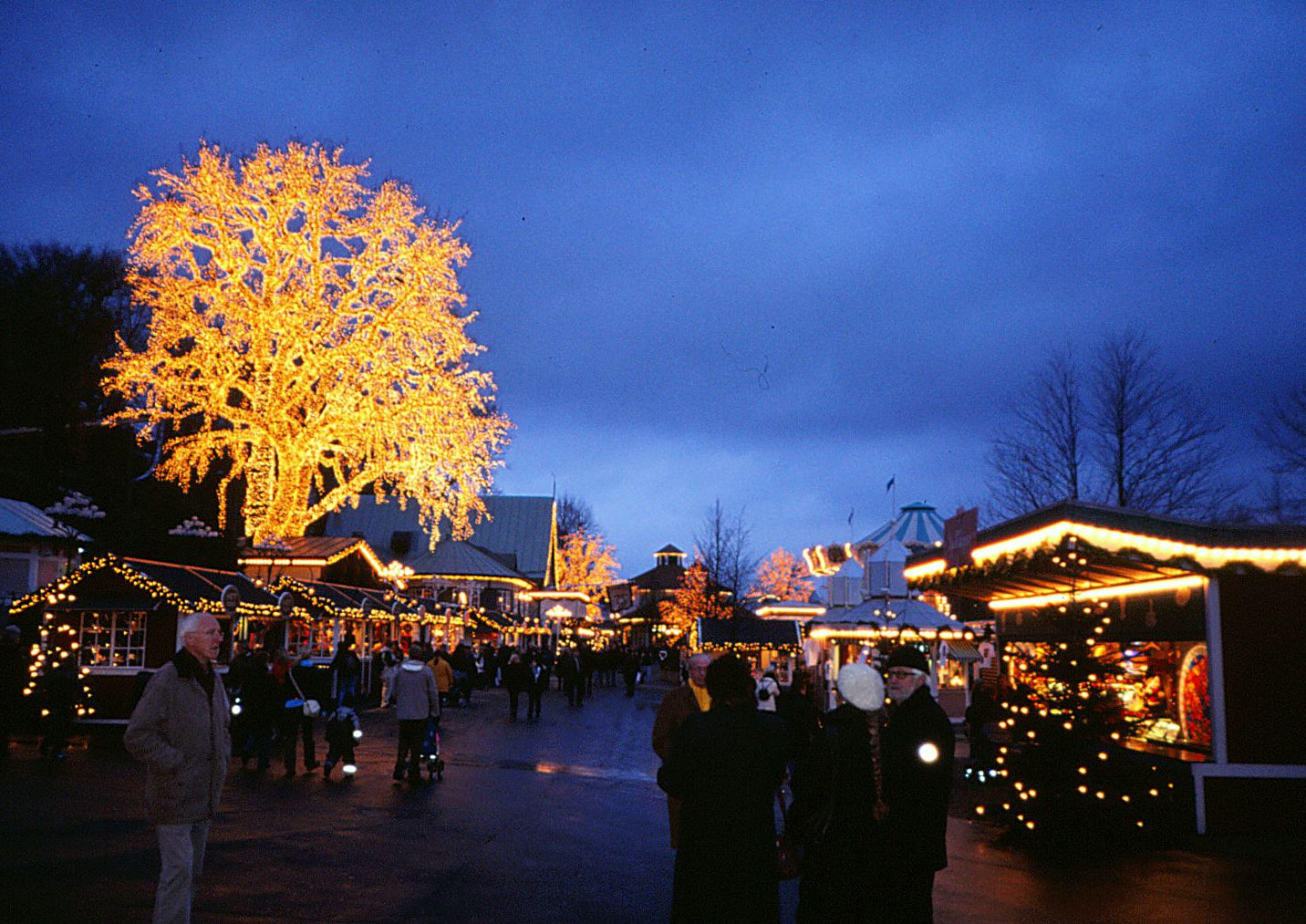
Liseberg dressed for Christmas market

Liseberg is an amusement park located in Gothenburg, Sweden, that opened in 1923. It is the second most visited theme park in Scandinavia, with around three million visitors annually. Among the noteworthy attractions is the wooden roller coaster Balder, twice (2003 and 2005) voted as the Best Wooden Tracked Roller Coaster in the world in a major international poll. The park itself has also been chosen as one of the top ten amusement parks in the world (2005) by Forbes magazine and second best in Europe (2022) by IAAPA.

In recent years, Liseberg has expanded into a year-round destination with the opening of the Liseberg Grand Curiosa Hotel in 2023 and the upcoming Oceana Water World (Oceana Vattenvärld), an indoor water park scheduled to open in 2027. Beyond amusement rides, the park is also a major venue for live entertainment, hosting summer concerts on its main stage (Stora Scenen) as well as musicals, revues, and theatre productions at Rondo and Lisebergsteatern.

In addition to the summer season, the park is also open during October to December, albeit with fewer rides operating, hosting a Halloween season with various houses of horrors and a Christmas market, with traditional Swedish cuisine such as mulled wine and specialties such as döner kebab made from reindeer meat.

The official colors of Liseberg are pink and green as can be seen on the entrance and the older houses in the park. The colors were also adopted for the logo, which was introduced in the 1980s, but changed in 2013 to the current logo.

== History ==
In 1752, the landowner Johan Anders Lamberg named his property Lisas Berg ("Lisa's Mountain") after his wife Elisabeth Söderberg. The area eventually became known as Liseberg.

In 1908, Gothenburg City bought the property, including the on-site buildings, for 225,000 Swedish kronor.

In 1923, Gothenburg celebrated its 300-year anniversary with the Gothenburg Exhibition, which included a Leisure Park and the Congress Park; the area was opened on 8 May and included fun slides and the 980 ft (300 m) long wooden Kanneworffska Funicular, designed by the Danish amusement builder Waldemar Lebech (originally there were five trains with three cars each that accommodated 10 people in each car, the ride lasted 2 minutes 30 seconds; it was demolished in 1987 after having served over 41 million visitors). The fun park was originally intended as a temporary attraction for the exhibition, but it became such a success with over 800,000 visitors in just over a month, that it was kept open. With an area of 1.5 km^{2} (0.58 sq mi), the park had cost 2.6 million kronors to build.

On 24 November 1924, the Gothenburg City Council decided to purchase the Liseberg amusement park for 1 million kronor. In 1925, the amusement park was taken over by the municipal company Liseberg AB. The park's first director and one of its initiators was the legendary "carpenter from Skåne" Herman Lindholm, who managed it 1923–42.

On 13 August 1935, the functional-inspired Liseberg Bath was inaugurated, created by engineer KI Schön Anderson. The pool was 15 m (49 ft) wide and 36 m (118 ft) long and sported underwater lights and artificial waves. The pool was able to receive 800 people at a time and the entrance fee with a cabin was 50 öre. The Swedish Olympic hopeful champion from 1920, Arvid Wallman, inaugurated the facilities. The pool was closed in 1956 and the building was demolished in 1962 for the forthcoming 40th anniversary in 1963.

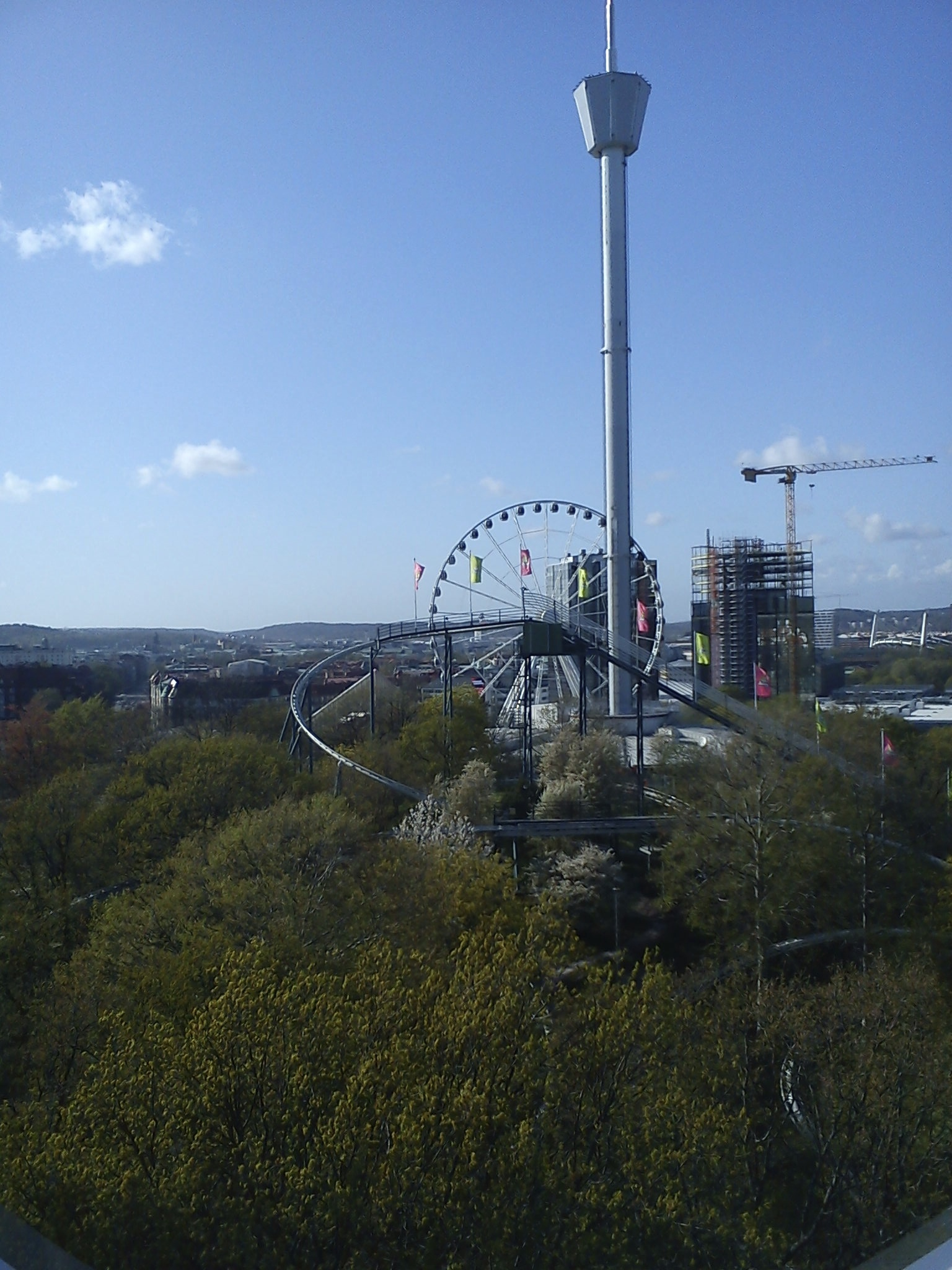
Liseberg Atmosfear

Rotundan was one of the largest dancehalls when it opened on 10 January 1940. Its architect was Axel Jonson, and the construction lasted for one year at a cost of approximately 500,000 SEK. The dance floor held 1,200 people and on the second floor a bar with the name Uggleklubben was opened. In 1956, the facility was renovated and its name changed to the Rondo. The architect Gunnar Aspe was behind the work, which cost 1 million dollars.

In 1947, Liseberg AB opened hotel facilities; Hotell Liseberg Heden. Right from the start one of the objectives of Liseberg was that it would be an opportunity for Gothenburg dwellers to experience recreation and the scenery, and in 1959 it opened the Princess Birgitta, a flower exhibition. During the opening ceremony, 15,000 roses were strewn over the park by helicopter. In 1977, Honor Place was founded, a collection of many of the world's largest celebrity hand impressions. At the time, there were 50 imprints; today, there are more than can fit the area, so an annual selection is made as to who should get the honor to appear.

In 1991, the Liseberg Guest AB was formed to oversee the running of Gothenburg campsites and harbor. In the 1990s, the park was expanded by 35,000 m^{2} (380,000 sq ft) and a host of new attractions were inaugurated. In 2015, Liseberg's different companies consolidated into one: Liseberg AB.

== The park ==
In addition to the park's more than 30 different rides, Liseberg has many venues (stages, dance hall, restaurants and arcade halls). The park has two entrances / exits (one at Örgrytevägen, the other at Getebergsled). Much of the park is forested.

In 1983, the green-pink bunny, Liseberg Rabbit, became the park's symbol and mascot.

In 1998, that year's Sveriges Television's Christmas calendar När karusellerna sover was filmed there.

The park is noted for its Liseberg's Lustgarten (botanical garden) that is landscaped and has many waterfalls, artworks and a variety of plants.

Liseberg Main Stage (Stora Scenen) was built in 1923 and was originally designed as a big music pavilion for the Gothenburg Symphony Orchestra and other large-scale concerts (over the years the design of the venue has been modified). Bands such as Abba and the Rolling Stones have performed here. Right next to the Stora Scenen is the smaller Kvarnteatern which plays host to various smaller events, in particular children's theater.

Polka (Polketten) is the dance hall that was built in 1925 but has since been moved to its current location. The Taube Scene was inaugurated in 2008 and is named after Evert Taube; this venue is used for different types of music such as jazz, and the Liseberg Orchestra plays here as well.

Adjacent to Liseberg Park are more venues: Lisebergshallen is an entertainment and sports arena, home to the local floorball team and team handball team. Rondo is the name of a show venue and Liseberg Theater is a local theater.

Multifarious Swedish performers have performed at Liseberg since its opening. Among them include, Zarah Leander, Maurice Chevalier, Marlene Dietrich, Evert Taube, ABBA, Lasse Dahlquist, Birgit Nilsson, Pernilla Wahlgren and Carola Häggkvist. Sten-Åke Cederhök played in 25 years' own perceptions of the "Week Revy". Other artists such as Sonya Hedenbratt, Hagge Geigert and Laila Westersund have appeared countless times at Liseberg. Olof Palme gave a speech on the main stage during his last election in 1985.

International acts who have performed at Liseberg include Bob Marley, Led Zeppelin, The Rolling Stones, Cliff Richard, Nightwish, Delta Rhythm Boys, The Jimi Hendrix Experience, Cat Stevens, The Beach Boys, The Kinks, The Who, PJ Proby, Frank Zappa with The Mothers of Invention, Bill Haley & His Comets, Procol Harum, and Toto, among others.

In 2004, a sing-along show called Lotta på Liseberg (Lotta at Liseberg), hosted by Lotta Engberg, began airing on television. It was held every summer at Stora scenen and aired on TV4 from 2009 to 2023.

== Rides and attractions ==
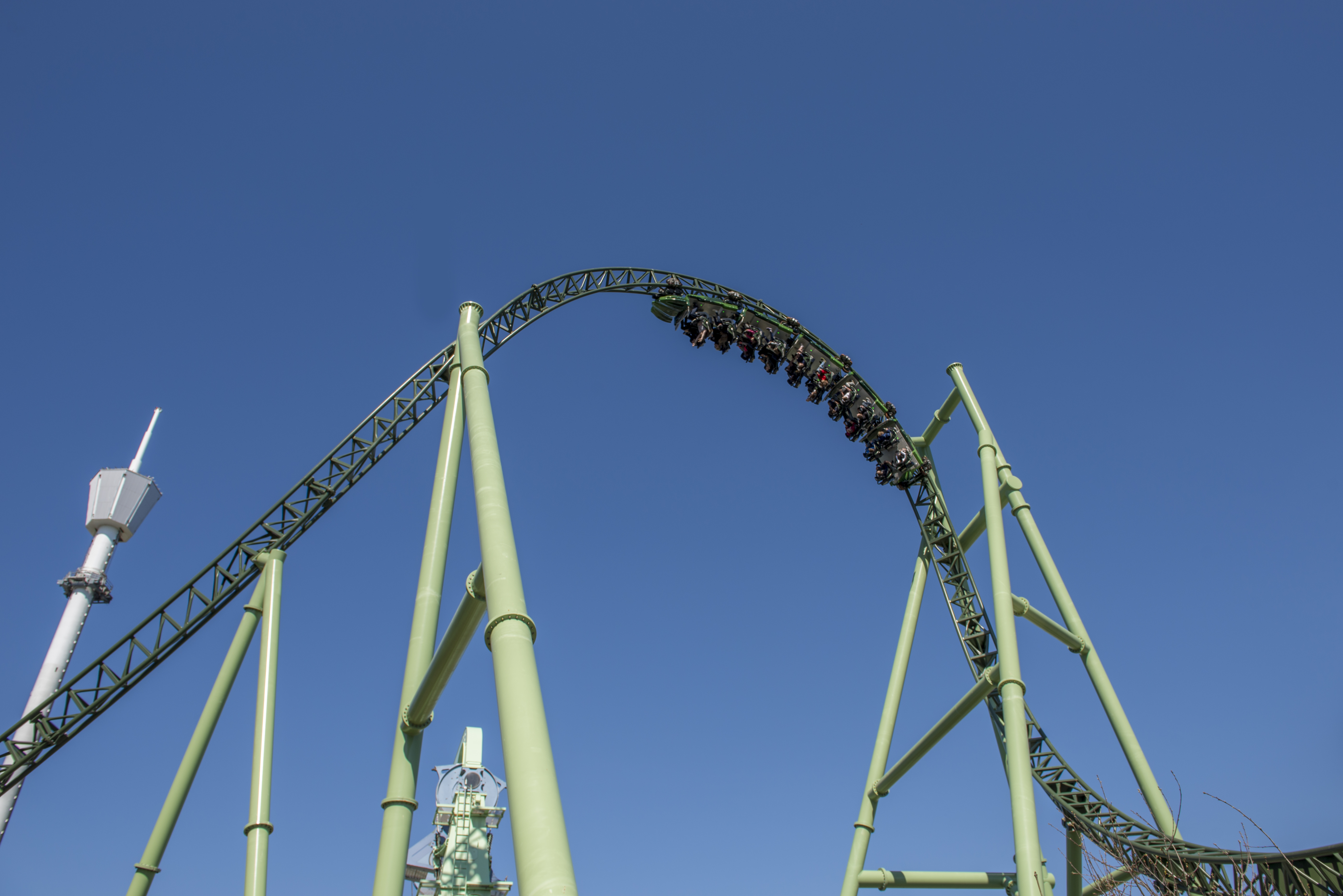
Helix in 2014.

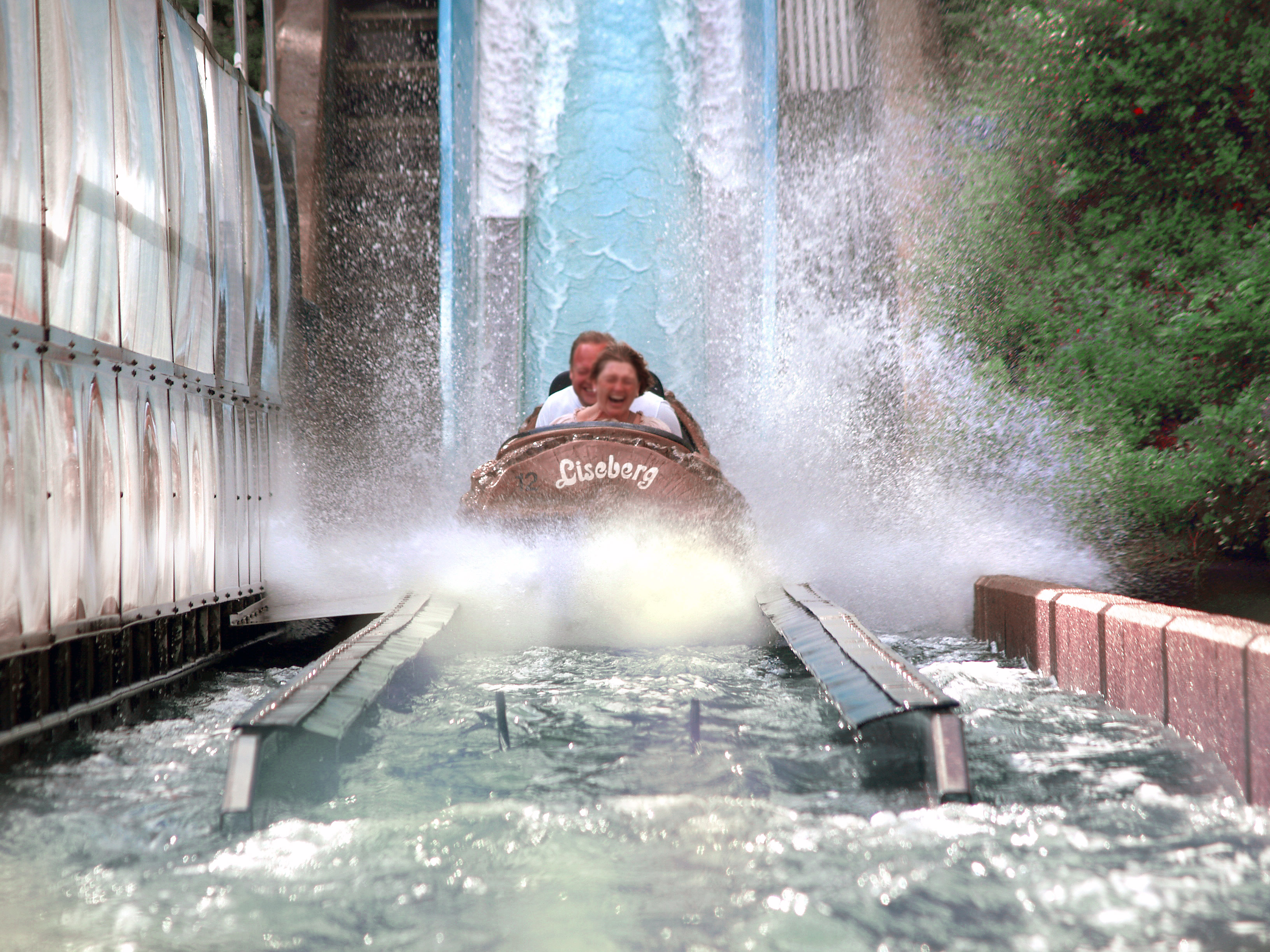
FlumeRide in 2010.

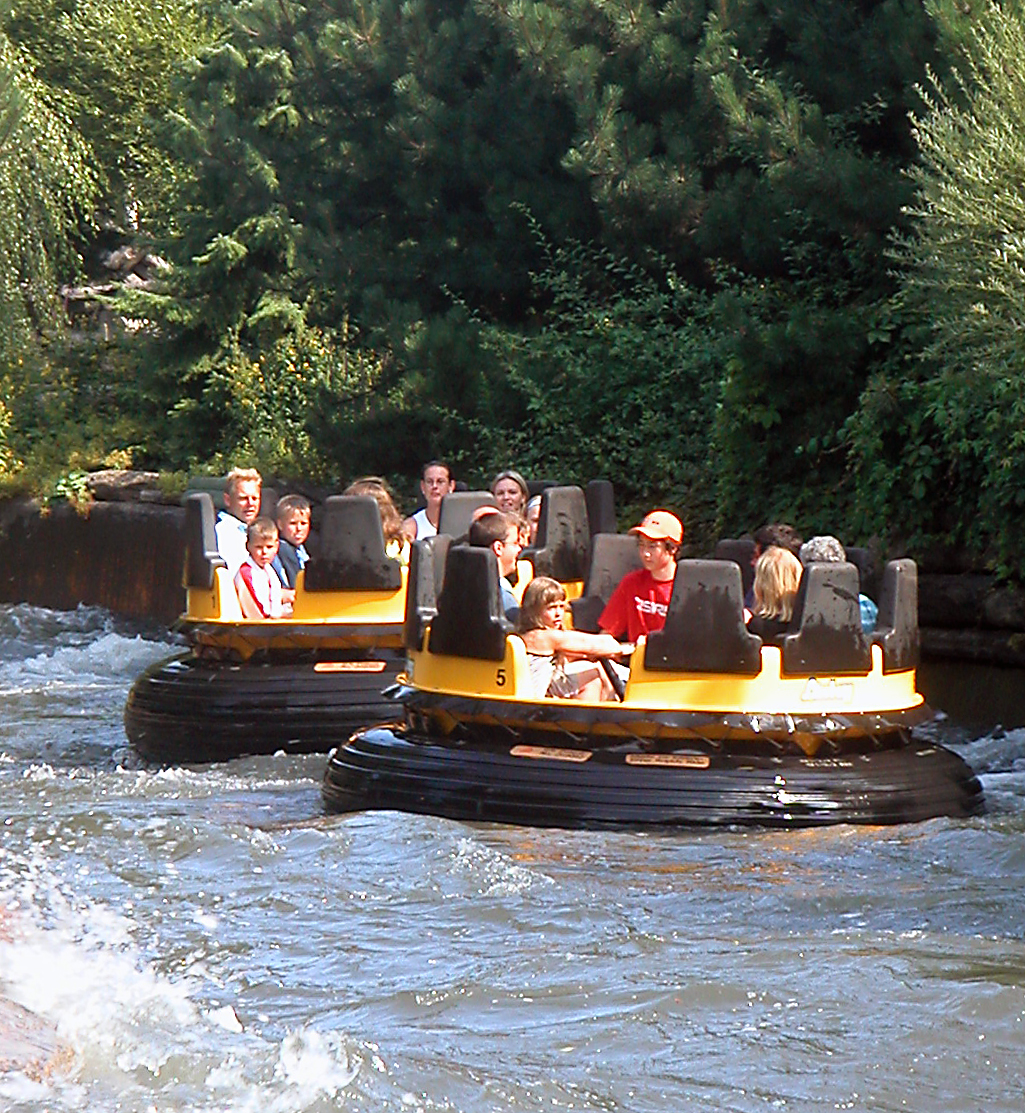
Kållerado in 2004.

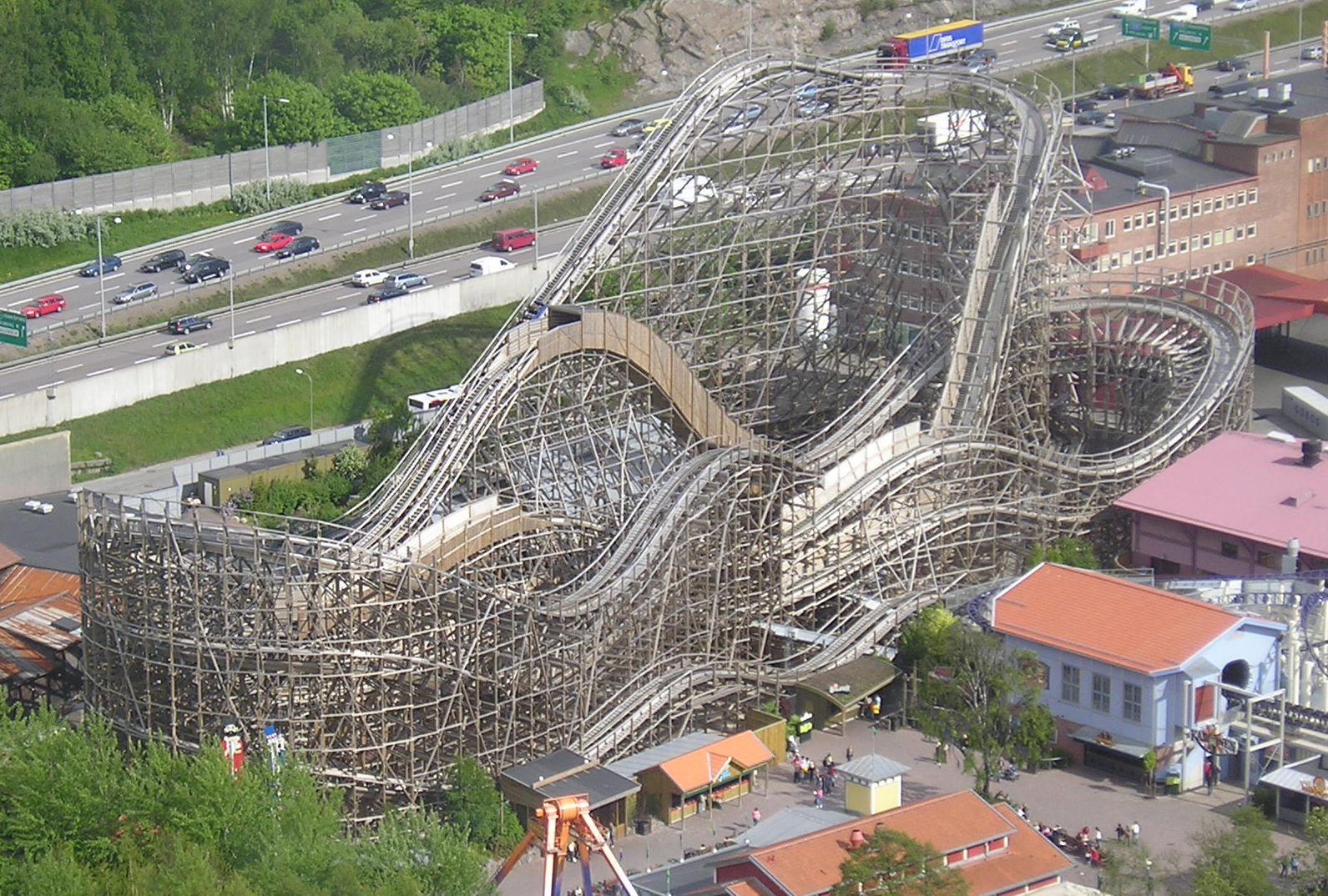
Balder roller coaster in 2006.

=== Roller coasters ===
| Ride | Year opened | Manufacturer | Description |
|---|---|---|---|
| Balder | 2003 | Intamin | A prefabricated wooden sit down coaster that reaches a speed of 90 km/h (55.9 mph) on a 1,070 m (3,510 ft) long track and a height of 36 m (118 ft). Twice nominated Best Wooden Tracked Roller Coaster. |
| Helix | 2014 | Mack Rides | Steel roller coaster featuring two launches, seven inversions and numerous airtime spots (second longest roller coaster with inversions in the world). It reaches a speed of 100 km/h (62 mph). |
| Lisebergbanan | 1987 | Zierer & Anton Schwarzkopf | A steel train-themed coaster that reaches a speed of 80 km/h (50 mph) on a 1,548 m (5,079 ft) long track and a height of 45 m (148 ft). |
| Rabalder | 2009 | Zierer | A children's steel sit down coaster that reaches a speed of 39 km/h (24 mph) on a 222 m (728 ft) long track and a height of 9 m (30 ft). |
| Stampbanan | 2013 | Preston & Barbieri | A small and short steel sit down coaster aimed at young children and first time riders. |
| Valkyria | 2018 | Bolliger & Mabillard | A dive coaster that reaches speeds of 104.9 km/h (65.2 mph) on a 700 m (2,300 ft) long track and at a height of 47 m (154 ft). The longest dive coaster in Europe. Replaced Kanonen (now operating at Lost Island Theme Park as Matugani). |
| Luna | 2023 | Vekoma | A family boomerang roller coaster and the newest roller coaster in the park. It is the fastest and tallest of its kind. |

=== Water rides ===
- FlumeRide – a 630 m (2,070 ft) long log flume ride that has two drops, the higher of which is 14 m (46 ft) (opened in 1973). Arrow Development.
- Kållerado – a rapids ride on a 9-passenger boat that navigates a 560 m (1,840 ft) course through waterfalls and foliage (opened in 1997). Intamin.
- Skepp o' skoj

=== Other rides ===
- AeroSpin – a 35 m (115 ft) SkyRoller. Opened in 2016 Gerstlauer.
- AtmosFear – originally an observation tower that was built in 1990, but was converted into a 116 m (381 ft) drop tower in 2011; height limit 140 cm (4 ft 7 in). Intamin. The longest free fall in Europe.
- Bushållplatsen
- Children's Paradise
- Cyklonen
- Fishing Boats
- Flygis
- Spökhotellet Gasten
- Hanghai – Disk'O, opened in 2009; height limit 130 cm (4 ft 3 in). Zamperla.
- JukeBox – a polyp spinner that opened in 2012 and replaced an older model designed by Anton Schwarzkopf; height limit 110 cm (3 ft 7 in). Gerstlauer. This attraction is from Canada's Wonderland which was originally named The Fury.
- Kaffekoppen – teacups
- Kaninlandsbanan
- Kristallsalongen – walkthrough mirror maze that opened back in 1961.
- Lilla Lots
- Lisebergshjulet – a 60 m (200 ft) tall Ferris wheel that was opened in 2012. Bussnik / Maurer Söhne.
- Loke – a 27 m (89 ft) tall Gyro Swing. Opened in 2017. Intamin.
- Mechanica – a 28 m (92 ft) custom Star Shape. Opened in 2015. Zierer.
- Rabbit Land
- Rabbit River
- Radiobilarna – bumper cars opened in 1988, but new cars were installed in 2010.
- Slänggungan – chair swing that opened in 1989. Zierer.
- Stormvåg - Their currently newest attraction that opened in 2026.
- Tempus – Nebulaz ride that opened in 2023; height limit 120 cm (3 ft 11 in) or 105 cm (3 ft 5 in) if accompanied by an adult. Manufacturer: Zamperla.
- Turbo – Sidecar XL ride that opened in 2023; height limit 130 cm (4 ft 3 in) or 90 cm (2 ft 11 in) if accompanied by an adult. Manufacturer: Technical Park
- Uppswinget – Screamin' Swing ride that opened in 2007; height limit 140 cm (4 ft 7 in). S&S Worldwide.
- Venetian Carousel

=== Children's rides ===
- Bushållplatsen– a playground situated in Kaninlandet that opened 2013.
- Cyklonen – on track cycle ride that opened in 2013. Zamperla.
- Farfars Bil – Vintage cars that opened in 2013. Replaced the 1979 Ihle Fahrzugbau Vintage cars (1979–2012). Metallbau Emmeln.
- Fisketuren – a fast boat circular that opened in 1988. Mack Rides.
- Flygis – flying barrels that go round and round. Zamperla.
- Hissningen – a children's drop tower, opened in 2013. Zierer.
- Hoppalång – bouncing and spinning circular that opened in 2013. Zamperla.
- Högspänningen – a flying wheels that opened in 2013. Metallbau Emmeln.
- Kaninlandsbanan – a panorama pedal around Rabbit land that opened in 2013. ETF Ride Systems.
- Lilla Lots – rocking tug that opened in 2006. Zamperla.
- Kaninresan – Slow boat ride that opened in 2001. Mack Rides.
- Skepp o' skoj – water boat ride that opened in 2012. ABC Engineering.
- Tempus – Nebulaz ride that opened in 2023; height limit 120 cm (3 ft 11 in) or 105 cm (3 ft 5 in) if accompanied by an adult. Manufacturer: Zamperla.
- Turbo – Sidecar XL ride that opened in 2023; height limit 130 cm (4 ft 3 in) or 90 cm (2 ft 11 in) if accompanied by an adult. Manufacturer: Technical Park
- Tuta & Kör – children's bumper cars that opened in 2013. Preston & Barbieri.
- Venetian Carousel – merry-go-round with ponies that opened in 2010. Bertazzon.

=== Other attractions ===
- Arcade Games – the park has many different arcade games, test-your-skill games and more. Extra charge.
- Spökhotellet Gasten – a horror maze with actors that opened in 1998; height limit 140 cm (4 ft 7 in).
- Liseberg Lustgarden – a walkthrough botanical and sculpture garden.
- Spelhuset – a two-story arcade hall full of various arcade games.
- Shows – Liseberg hosts numerous shows, concerts and performances of every kind throughout the year, some of which are included in the admission price, with others costing extra.

=== Former attractions ===
- Aerovarvet, Intamin Looping Starship (1989–2002)
- Ap-o-teket / Jubel i busken (animatronic show) (1983–1984)
- Bergbanan (roller coaster) (1923–1987)
- Breakdance, Huss (1987–1993)
- Bumper Cars (1927–1987 and 1988–1996)
- Cinema 180° (1979–1987)
- Cirkusexpressen (children's roller coaster) (1977–2008)
- Crinoline, carousel (1996–2005)
- DiscoRound, Huss DiscoRound (1986–1988)
- Drakbåtarna (1997-2019)
- Enterprise (1976–1982)
- Flygande Elefanter (1965-1986) (2010-2019)
- HangOver (roller coaster) (1997–2002)
- House Upside-Down (1985–1996)
- Höjdskräcken, S&S Turbo Drop (2000–2015)
- Hökfärden, Huss Condor (1985–1990)
- Kanonen (roller coaster) (2005–2016)
- Kulingen, Intamin Pirate Ship (2002–2008)
- Lisebergstornet (observation tower) (1990–2010)
- Lisebergs Loopen (roller coaster) (1980–1995)
- Ormen Långe, Zierer Pirate Ship (1980–1989)
- Pariserhjulet (Ferris wheel) (1967–2015)
- Rainbow, Huss Rainbow (1983–2008)
- Snabbtåget (1989–1992)
- Super 8 (roller coaster) (1966–1979)
- SpinRock, Zamperla Discovery 24 (2002–2016)
- TopSpin, Huss Topspin (1993–2006)
- Tornado, SDC Galactica (1989–2008)
- Uppskjutet, S&S Space Shot (1996–2015)
- Virvelvinden (1929-2021)
- Fairytale Castle (Sagoslottet) (1968–2017)

== Oceana Waterpark ==
In November 2020, Liseberg started construction on Scandinavia's largest water park called "Oceana". The water park's total area measures 13,600 m^{2} (146,000 sq ft) and it has 14 various attractions and space for up to 1,750 visitors.

On 12 February 2024 a massive fire broke out at the water park, which was still under construction and had been scheduled to open in the spring. The fire left one person dead and injured 22 others, produced three explosions and caused the evacuation of a nearby hotel and office facilities. According to initial reports, Oceana was totally destroyed by the fire and nothing was salvageable. The fire reignited again, the day after it was extinguished. A body was found during clearing operations. The deceased man was later identified as Patrik Gillholm, a manager at the park. A subsequent investigation found that the fire was caused as a result of deficiencies in the fitting of the water diversion pipes, which resulted in the pipes overheating and then catching fire during electrofusion.

On 17 July 2024, during a board meeting, a decision was made to rebuild the water park and attempt to have it finished by 2026. Clearing operations of the site were ongoing. On 7 July 2025, Liseberg filed a lawsuit against the insurance company Trygg-Hansa after the insurer refused to pay compensation following the fire.

== Visitors ==
| | Number of visitors | | | |
| Year | Total | Summer | Halloween | Christmas |
| 1923 | 4.1 million* | | | |
| 1924 | 473,319 | 473,319 | – | – |
| 1925 | 478,988 | 478,988 | – | – |
| 1926 | 560,290 | 560,290 | – | – |
| 1927 | 610,846 | 610,846 | – | – |
| 1928 | 717,740 | 717,740 | – | – |
| 1929 | 873,816 | 873,816 | – | – |
| 1930 | 840,001 | 840,001 | – | – |
| 1931 | 884,530 | 884,530 | – | – |
| 1932 | 773,588 | 773,588 | – | – |
| 1933 | 820,191 | 820,191 | – | – |
| 1934 | 879,135 | 879,135 | – | – |
| 1935 | 917,415 | 917,415 | – | – |
| 1936 | 1,059,717 | 1,059,717 | – | – |
| 1937 | 1,118,092 | 1,118,092 | – | – |
| 1938 | 1,171,901 | 1,171,901 | – | – |
| 1939 | 1,274,692 | 1,274,692 | – | – |
| 1940 | 879,585 | 879,585 | – | – |
| 1941 | 1,028,817 | 1,028,817 | – | – |
| 1942 | 1,205,964 | 1,205,964 | – | – |
| 1943 | 1,366,155 | 1,366,155 | – | – |
| 1944 | 1,395,920 | 1,395,920 | – | – |
| 1945 | No information | | | |
| 1946 | 1,781,612 | 1,781,612 | – | – |
| 1947 | 1,836,959 | 1,836,959 | – | – |
| 1948 | 1,697,513 | 1,697,513 | – | – |
| 1949 | No information | | | |
| 1950 | 1,852,991 | 1,852,991 | – | – |
| 1951 | 1,859,884 | 1,859,884 | – | – |
| 1952 | No information | | | |
| 1953 | 1,764,414 | 1,764,414 | – | – |
| 1954 | 1,733,192 | 1,733,192 | – | – |
| 1955 | 1,833,541 | 1,833,541 | – | – |
| 1956 | 1,748,212 | 1,748,212 | – | – |
| 1957 | No information | | | |
| 1958 | 1,783,376 | 1,783,376 | – | – |
| 1959 | 1,741,525 | 1,741,525 | – | – |
| 1960 | 1,821,706 | 1,821,706 | – | – |
| 1961 | 1,769,959 | 1,769,959 | – | – |
| 1962 | 1,653,814 | 1,653,814 | – | – |
| 1963 | No information | | | |
| 1964 | 1,671,940 | 1,671,940 | – | – |
| 1965 | 1,692,594 | 1,692,594 | – | – |
| 1966 | 1,617,980 | 1,617,980 | – | – |
| 1967 | 1,642,684 | 1,642,684 | – | – |
| 1983 | 2.5 million | 2.5 million | – | – |
| 1984 | 2.35 million | 2.35 million | – | – |
| 1985 | 2.41 million | 2.41 million | – | – |
| 1986 | 2.55 million | 2.55 million | – | – |
| 1987 | 2.87 million | 2.87 million | – | – |
| 1988 | 2.8 million | 2.8 million | – | – |
| 1990 | 2.7 million | 2.7 million | – | – |
1991–1998: No information
| 1999 | 2.5 million | 2.5 million | – | – |
| 2000 | 3.1 million | 2.7 million | – | 418,000 |
| 2001 | 3 million | 2.45 million | – | 549,000 |
| 2002 | 3 million | 2.5 million | – | 526,000 |
| 2003 | 3.4 million | 2.9 million | – | 478,000 |
| 2004 | 2.9 million | 2.5 million | – | 491,000 |
| 2005 | 3.1 million | 2.59 million | – | 526,000 |
| 2006 | 2.8 million | 2.35 million | – | 444,000 |
| 2007 | 2.9 million | 2.45 million | – | 530,000 |
| 2008 | 2.8 million | 2.28 million | – | 546,000 |
| 2009 | 3.1 million | 2.4 million | – | 552,000 |
| 2010 | 2.7 million | 2.21 million | – | 495,000 |
| 2011 | 2.7 million | 2.3 million | – | 420,000 |
| 2012 | 3.3 million | 2.78 million | – | 472,000 |
| 2013 | 2.8 million | 2.27 million | – | 532,000 |
| 2014 | 3.1 million | 2.56 million | – | 542,000 |
| 2015 | 3.1 million | 2.47 million | 205,000 | 425,000 |
| 2016 | 3.1 million | 2.4 million | 173,000 | 525,000 |
| 2017 | 3.1 million** | 2.15 million | 280,000 | 448,000 |
| 2018 | 3.1 million** | 2.1 million | 320,000 | 484,000 |
| 2019 | 3.1 million** | 2.1 million | 320,000 | 484,000 |
| 2020 | 0 | 0 | 0 | 0 |

* Includes all guests at Gothenburg's 300th anniversary celebrations.

** Includes guests to Lisebergsteatern, Rondo, Lisebergshallen and events inside the park

== See also ==
- Gröna Lund, another amusement park in Sweden, Located in Stockholm
- Kolmården Wildlife Park, a zoo and amusement park in Sweden, overlooking the Bråviken bay,
- Incidents at European amusement parks
