= Phantom Theater =

Phantom Theater may refer to:

- Phantom Theater (1992–2002), a defunct dark ride at Kings Island
- Phantom Theater: Opening Nightmare, a dark ride operating at Kings Island since 2026
