= Scooby-Doo's Haunted Mansion =

Scooby-Doo themed interactive series

Six Flags Fiesta Texas
- Name: Scooby-Doo! Ghostblasters: The Mystery of the Haunted Mansion
- Area: Fiesta Bay Boardwalk
- Status: Removed
- Opening date: 2002
- Closing date: January 7, 2018
- Replaced by: Pirates of the Deep Sea

Six Flags St. Louis
- Name: Scooby-Doo! Ghostblasters: The Mystery of the Scary Swamp
- Area: DC Comics Plaza
- Status: Removed
- Opening date: 2002
- Closing date: September 14, 2014
- Replaced: Castaway Kids
- Replaced by: Justice League: Battle for Metropolis

Parque Warner Madrid
- Name: La Aventura de Scooby-Doo
- Area: Cartoon Village
- Status: Operating
- Opening date: June 16, 2005

Canada's Wonderland
- Name: Scooby-Doo's Haunted Mansion
- Area: Hanna Barbera Land
- Status: Removed
- Opening date: May 7, 2000
- Closing date: November 1, 2009
- Replaced: Bedrock Dock
- Replaced by: Boo Blasters on Boo Hill

Carowinds
- Name: Scooby-Doo's Haunted Mansion
- Area: Carolina RFD
- Status: Removed
- Opening date: 2001
- Closing date: November 1, 2009
- Replaced: Harmony Hall
- Replaced by: Boo Blasters on Boo Hill

Kings Island
- Name: Scooby-Doo! and the Haunted Castle
- Area: International Street
- Status: Removed
- Opening date: 2003
- Closing date: November 1, 2009
- Replaced: Phantom Theater
- Replaced by: Boo Blasters on Boo Hill

Kings Dominion
- Name: Scooby-Doo! and the Haunted Mansion
- Area: KidZville
- Status: Removed
- Opening date: 2004
- Closing date: November 1, 2009
- Replaced by: Boo Blasters on Boo Hill

Ride statistics
- Attraction type: Interactive Dark Ride
- Manufacturer: Sally Corporation
- Designer: Sally Corporation
- Theme: Scooby-Doo
- Length: 377 ft (115 m)
- Capacity: 800 riders per hour
- Scenes: 17
- Animatronics: 80

Scooby-Doo's Haunted Mansion is a Scooby-Doo-themed interactive dark ride series created by Sally Corporation based on Hanna-Barbera's long-running animated television series. The ride transports guests in a vehicle equipped with light guns that are used to shoot at various targets to collect points throughout the ride. At its peak, the ride model was located at seven amusement parks around the world including Canada's Wonderland, the location of the first installation that debuted in 2000. Initially known under a variety of names, the ride's Scooby-Doo theme has been replaced by Boo Blasters on Boo Hill at several locations and removed from others. The last remaining installation is La Aventura de Scooby-Doo at Parque Warner Madrid in Madrid, Spain.

== History ==
In the late 1990s, Paramount Parks-owned Canada's Wonderland collaborated with Sally Corporation to develop Scooby-Doo's Haunted Mansion. The ride opened to the public on May 7, 2000. In November that year, the ride was recognized as the Best New Children's Ride. Similar versions of ride were added to three other Paramount Park locations over the next few years.

In 2002, Six Flags bought into the ride concept installing it at two locations, Six Flags Fiesta Texas and Six Flags St. Louis, with the latter using an existing water ride system. On June 16, 2005, Parque Warner Madrid (while it was operated by Six Flags) also added an installation as well featuring a trackless ride system manufactured by ETF Ride Systems. The ride was opened by José Corbacho and El Terrat.

Following Cedar Fair's acquisition of Paramount Parks, the Scooby-Doo dark rides at its properties were re-themed prior to the 2010 season. The move was part of the company's objective to remove the Hanna-Barbera brand from all of its parks. Sally Corporation assisted with creating a new theme that became known as Boo Blasters on Boo Hill. The makeover left the interactive shooting aspect intact, while the Hanna-Barbera characters were replaced in favor of ghost-like creatures.

During the 2014 season, Six Flags St. Louis put up a sign at the attraction that read, "Scooby-Doo Ghostblasters: The Mystery of the Scary Swamp will close permanently, September 14, 2014 for future improvements". It was later announced that it would be replaced by Justice League: Battle for Metropolis. In late 2017, Six Flags Fiesta Texas announced that their installation of the ride would close permanently on January 7, 2018. Its replacement Pirates of the Deep Sea opened to the public on January 12, 2019.

== Locations ==
Name	Park	Location	Opened	Closed	Status	Ref
La Aventura de Scooby-Doo "Scooby Doo's Adventure"	Parque Warner Madrid	San Martín de la Vega, Madrid, Spain	2005	Open	Operating	
Scooby-Doo! and the Haunted Castle	Kings Island	Mason, Ohio, United States	2003	2009	Rethemed as Boo Blasters on Boo Hill	
Scooby-Doo! and the Haunted Mansion	Kings Dominion	Doswell, Virginia, United States	2004	2009	Rethemed as Boo Blasters on Boo Hill	
Scooby-Doo! Ghostblasters: The Mystery of the Haunted Mansion	Six Flags Fiesta Texas	San Antonio, Texas, United States	2002	2018	Closed; Replaced by Pirates of the Deep Sea	
Scooby-Doo's Haunted Mansion	Canada's Wonderland	Vaughan, Ontario, Canada	2000	2009	Rethemed as Boo Blasters on Boo Hill	
Scooby-Doo's Haunted Mansion	Carowinds	Charlotte, North Carolina, United States	2001	2009	Rethemed as Boo Blasters on Boo Hill	
Scooby-Doo! Ghostblasters: The Mystery of the Scary Swamp	Six Flags St. Louis	Eureka, Missouri, United States	2002	2014	Closed; Replaced by Justice League: Battle for Metropolis	

== Ride experience ==
The ride is a dark ride experience for families which involves shooting laser guns at ghosts and ghouls infesting Ghastley Manor (known as Ghastly Manor on the ride's entrance). Riders in consecutive Mystery Machine-themed cars compete with each other to see who can shoot the most ghosts. Riders also shoot at Scooby Snacks, triggering appearances from Scooby-Doo. Also infesting Ghastley Manor is the Phantom Shadow, who at the end of the ride is caught by Scooby and Shaggy Rogers (who covers his eyes in fear) and revealed to be a counterfeiter named Dr. D.M. Ghastley, the owner of Ghastley Manor, who was illegally printing money in the dungeon of Ghastley Manor, and dressed up as the Phantom Shadow to scare away any trespassers. The riders then enter the garage, where Ghastley isn't sent to jail as a skeleton is driving the police van with the cop trapped in a box. The Scooby-Doo theme was licensed from Hanna-Barbera by the ride's creators, Sally Corporation. The riders come across a gigantic pipe organ, where in the Canada's Wonderland version, a rendition of the classical the piece "Fantasia in G Minor BWV 542" by J.S. Bach is heard.

The installation at Six Flags St. Louis differed from the rest as it relied upon a water ride system. It was therefore themed to a journey through a swamp. It featured different monsters from the Scooby-Doo series as well as the Mystery Inc. gang popping out of trees and shrubs.

The outsides of the show buildings are decorated with a fiberglass blue and purple castle with stylized turrets. Two circular windows resemble eyes while the entrance to the castle resembles a mouth. Guests entered the attraction by passing under a Gothic-style arch bearing the rides name, and that was adorned on either side by the letters "GM," standing for Ghastley Manor.

== Voices ==
- Scott Innes as Scooby-Doo and Shaggy Rogers (Kings Island, Kings Dominion, Canada's Wonderland and Carowinds version)
- Frank Welker as Scooby-Doo (Six Flags Fiesta Texas and Six Flags St. Louis version)
- Casey Kasem as Shaggy Rogers (Six Flags Fiesta Texas and Six Flags St. Louis version)
- David García Vázquez as Scooby-Doo (Spanish)
- Juan Logar Jr. as Shaggy Rogers (Spanish)

== Awards ==
- IAAPA Best New Children's Ride (2000)
- UETPA Best Family Attraction (2005)

== Gallery ==
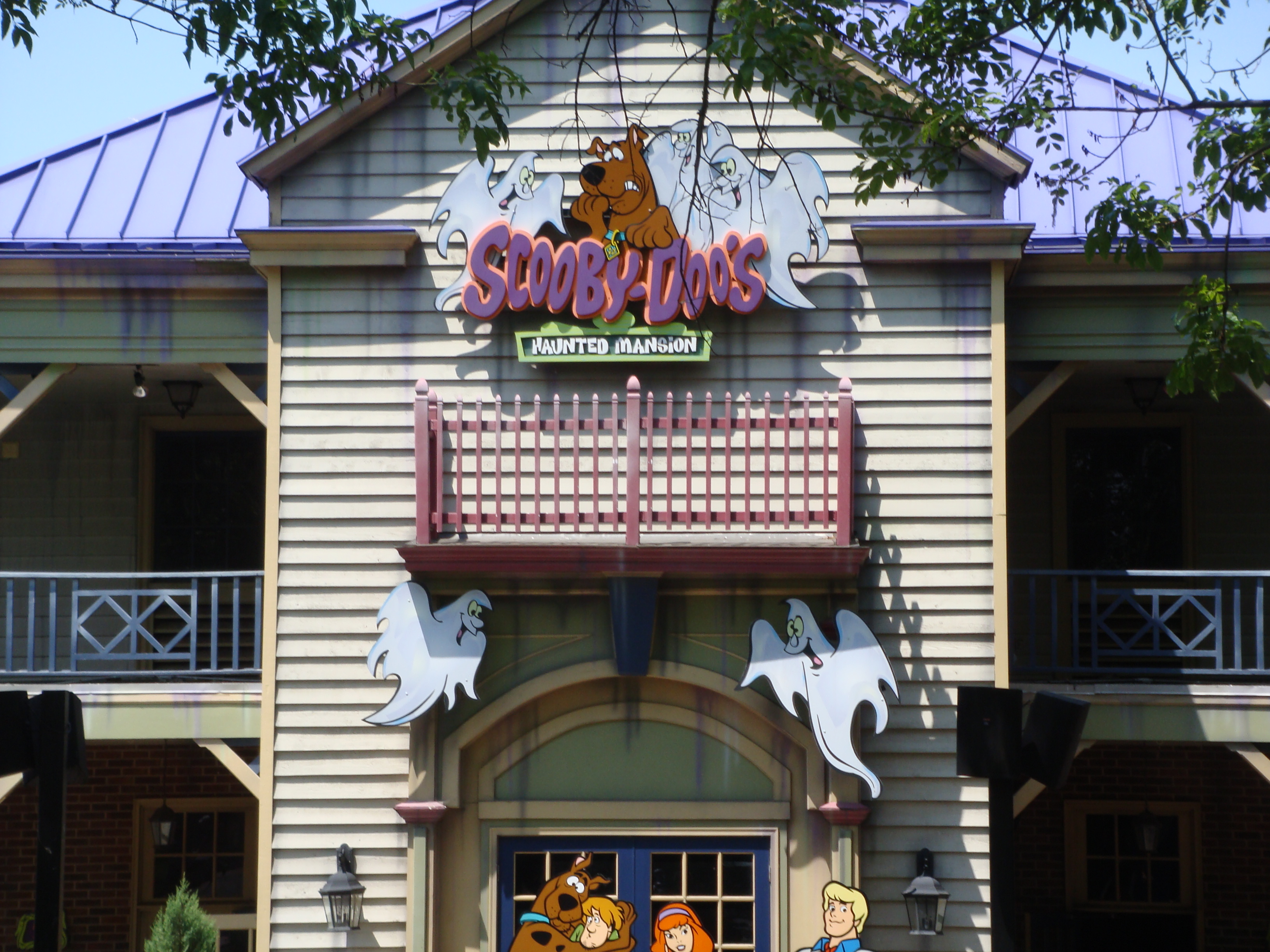
Scooby-Doo's Haunted Mansion at Carowinds (now Boo Blasters on Boo Hill)

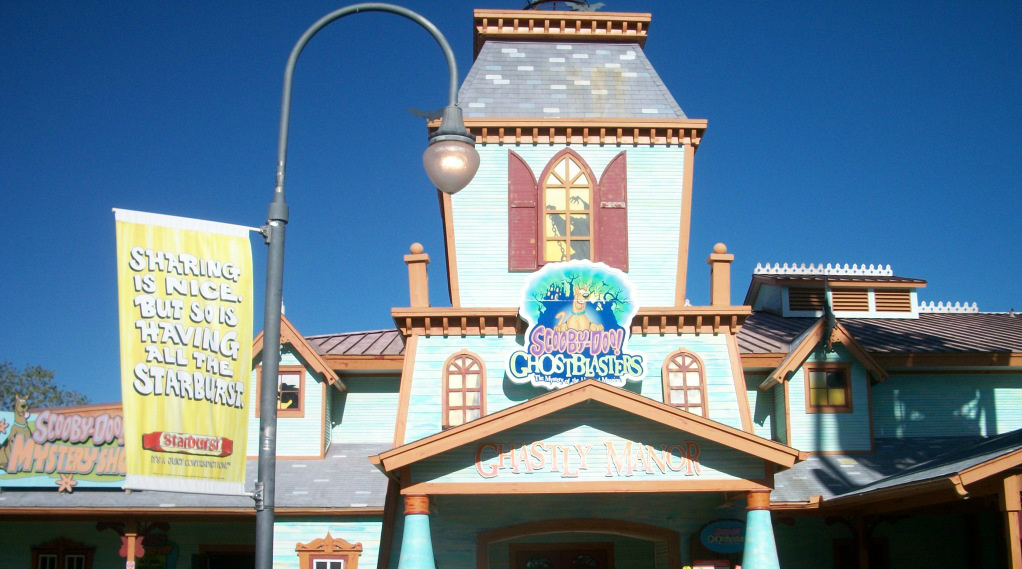
Scooby-Doo Ghostblasters: The Mystery of the Haunted Mansion at Six Flags Fiesta Texas (now Pirates of the Deep Sea)

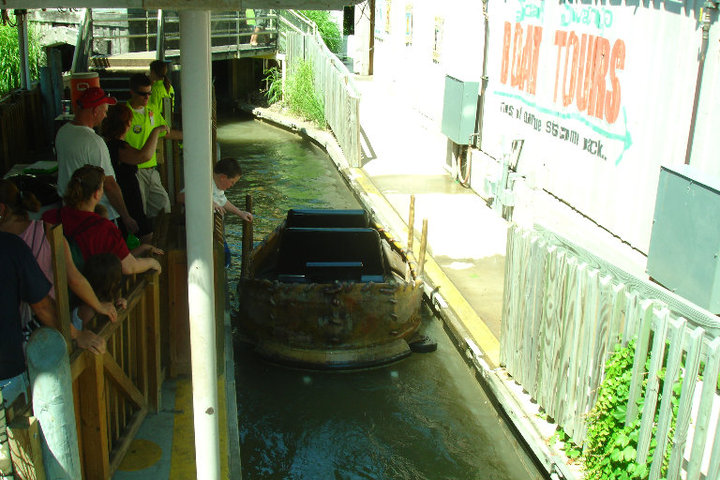
Scooby-Doo Ghostblasters: The Mystery of the Scary Swamp at Six Flags St. Louis (now Justice League: Battle for Metropolis)

== See also ==
- Ghost Blasters
