= Volkanu: Quest for the Golden Idol =

Dark ride at Lost Island Theme Park

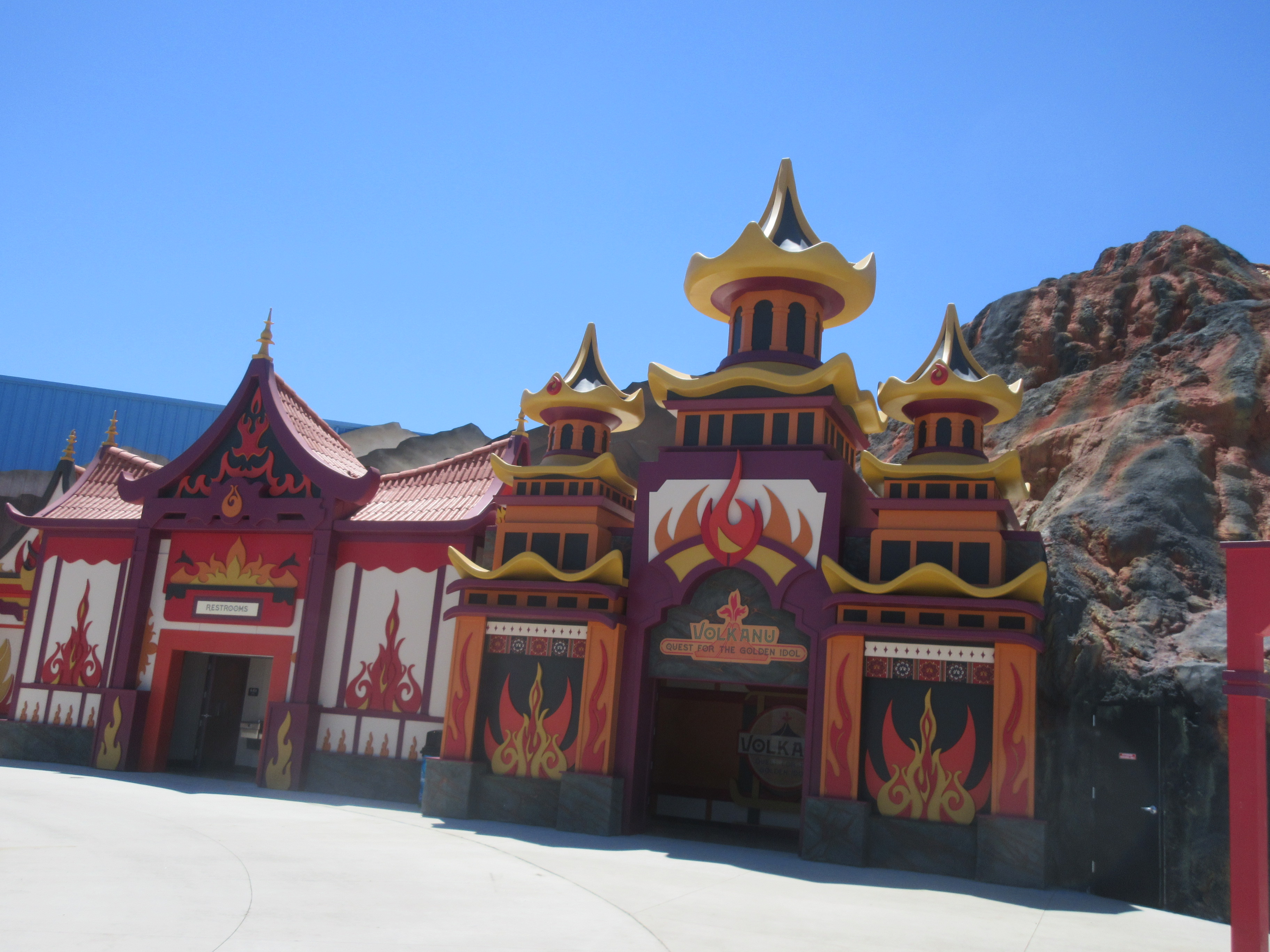

Lost Island Theme Park
- Area: Mura Fire Realm
- Status: Operating
- Opening date: June 18, 2022

Ride statistics
- Attraction type: Interactive dark ride
- Manufacturer: Sally Corporation
- Designer: Sally Corporation
- Site area: 9,750 sq ft (906 m^{2})
- Capacity: 327 riders per hour
- Vehicle type: Car
- Vehicles: 4 (built by ETF Ride Systems)
- Riders per vehicle: 6
- Rows: 2
- Riders per row: 3
- Duration: 5 minutes, 11 seconds
- Animatronics: Sally Corporation
- Targets: Alterface
- CGI: Pure Imagination Studios
- Website: Official website

Volkanu: Quest for the Golden Idol is a 4D interactive dark ride located at Lost Island Theme Park in Waterloo, Iowa. Designed by Sally Corporation, the ride opened to the public on June 18, 2022.

== History ==
In 2010, Sally Corporation developed a shooter dark ride concept titled Forbidden Island as an alternative to their popular Ghost Blasters, which would be further developed into a 4D dark ride concept titled Volkanicus around 2015. The concept caught the attention of Lost Island Waterpark representatives as they were beginning to develop plans for the theme park and the Volkanicus concept was refined to fit into the lore developed for the park and focused more specifically on the lava cavern portions of the original pitch.

The attraction would be formally announced at the 2021 IAAPA Expo with the animatronic of the Shaman Tago Nui being displayed at Sally's booth.

== Ride and theme ==
The ride is located in the park's volcano, which is in the Mura (fire theme) section of the park. Several immersive themed environments during more than five minutes of the duration of the ride. The 4D attraction integrates a custom storyline based around an ancient fire demon, trackless vehicles and interactive gaming elements with immersive scenery and animatronics. Within the park's overall storyline, the attraction is positioned as the grand climax to a guest's adventure of saving the island of Auk Modu from peril.

As told within the attraction's queue, pre-show and various other platforms for the park's story, Volkanu was once known as Kanu, a rogue member of the island's Tamariki guardian spirits. Seeking to hoard power for himself at a time when the island faced a great imbalance of elemental power, with the Mura having begun using their strength against their neighbors, Kanu transformed into a living embodiment of volcanic fury and destroyed much of the island in an eruption. Now faced with a common enemy, the peoples of Auk Modu united their powers and performed a ritual to trap Volkanu in the Temple of Fire under the island's volcano, with a magical idol known as the Ora Tika being forged to serve as an enchanted lock. Repenting for their actions, the Mura swore to keep the peace and guard the Ora Tika and the other realms worked together to rebuild. However, a mysterious band of thieves would steal the idol, allowing Volkanu to escape and threaten the island again, with the group being turned into a group of tiki sentinels guarding the lost idol.

Guided by the Tamariki Hulaka and the Mura shaman Tago Nui, guests board an Inferno Transport vehicle armed with Thermal Equalizers developed by the five realms to recover the Idol and battle Volkanu's lava minions. Traveling to the Forbidden Grotto, riders destroy the Tiki sentinels and claim the idol before Volkanu emerges and pursues guests down the mountain. Traveling down to old Mura ruins passing smoke spewing stones, Tago Nui appears through a Pepper's ghost illusion to tell us to make our way back to the temple, while a burst of flames launches from a nearby wall. Passing by teetering columns, the Inferno Transports encounter an three headed lava dragon and blast through a wall of carved faces into a cavern full of lava bats, scorpions and snakes. In a cavern with leering faces, a large animatronic lava bat unfolds and screeches at guests before bringing them in front of a roaring volcanic face. Coming closer to the inner sanctum of the Temple of Fire, the Inferno Transports face two fireball throwing lava monsters before making it across a final bridge past another lava snake. Entering the gates of the Temple of Fire, the idol is put back into place and Volkanu makes one last attempt to stop you, chasing you out of the gates and reaching outside the doors before the idol's power pulls him back in. Hulaka thanks you for saving Lost Island as you see a scoreboard for the car before passing by a glowing wall with Volkanu's roaring face before returning to the station.

== Reception ==
The dark ride won the 2022 Golden Ticket Award for Best New Family Attraction. The award stunned the industry as the ride beat Remy's Ratatouille Adventure at Epcot, breaking the streak of Disney attractions since the award's inception in 2019.
