= Golden Ticket Award for Best New Family Attraction =

Amusement park industry award

- Awarded for: Best new family attraction in Amusement parks
- Country: United States
- Presented by: Amusement Today
- First award: 2019
- Currently held by: Phantom Theater: Opening Nightmare
- Website: goldenticketawards.com

The Golden Ticket Award for Best New Family Attraction is presented by Amusement Today to the best new family attraction in the amusement park industry.

== History ==
The Golden Ticket Awards have been presenting awards since 1998 acknowledging the amusement industry achievement in different categories. The Best New Family Attraction award was introduced in 2019 and the first award was presented to Star Wars: Millennium Falcon – Smugglers Run at Disneyland. Before 2019, there was one award recognizing new attractions, which then was divided up to showcase more rides in the industry.

The award is based on the attractions that are catered to families, with a ride experience that goes differs from a production model ride installation.

== Family Attraction recipients ==
Year	Winner	Park	Other candidates
2019	Star Wars: Millennium Falcon – Smugglers Run	Disneyland	Meow Wolf's Kaleidoscape at Elitch Gardens; Kings Mills Antique Autos at Kings Island; Tidal Twister at SeaWorld San Diego; Masters of Flight at Legoland Florida
2021	Star Wars: Rise of the Resistance	Disney's Hollywood Studios	Knott's Bear-y Tales: Return to the Fair at Knott's Berry Farm; Mickey & Minnie's Runaway Railway at Disney's Hollywood Studios; Mystic River Falls at Silver Dollar City; Star Wars: Rise of the Resistance at Disneyland
2022	Volkanu: Quest for the Golden Idol	Lost Island Theme Park	Remy's Ratatouille Adventure at Epcot; Pirates of Speelunker Cave at Six Flags Over Texas; Jumanji - The Adventure at Gardaland; Chasseurs de Tornades at Futuroscope
2023	Mario Kart: Bowser's Challenge	Universal Studios Hollywood	Mickey & Minnie's Runaway Railway at Disneyland; Draken Falls at Adventureland; Yuta Falls at Lost Island Theme Park; Treasure Hunt: The Ride at Monterey, California
2024	Fire in the Hole	Silver Dollar City	Anna and Elsa's Frozen Journey at Tokyo DisneySea; Zootopia: Hot Pursuit at Shanghai Disneyland; Tiana's Bayou Adventure at Magic Kingdom; SpongeBob's Crazy Carnival Ride at Circus Circus Las Vegas
2025	Danse Macabre	Efteling	Harry Potter and the Battle at the Ministry at Universal Epic Universe; Monsters Unchained: The Frankenstein Experiment at Universal Epic Universe; Mario Kart: Bowser's Challenge at Universal Epic Universe; Ghostly Manor at Paultons Park
2026	Phantom Theater: Opening Nightmare	Kings Island	WingZ of Wonder at Morgan's Wonderland; The Enchanted Greenhouse at Six Flags Qiddiya City; Bello Bay Cruise at Universal Kids Resort; Expédition Nautibus at Grand Aquarium Saint-Malo
