= Boo Blasters on Boo Hill =

Six Flags dark ride

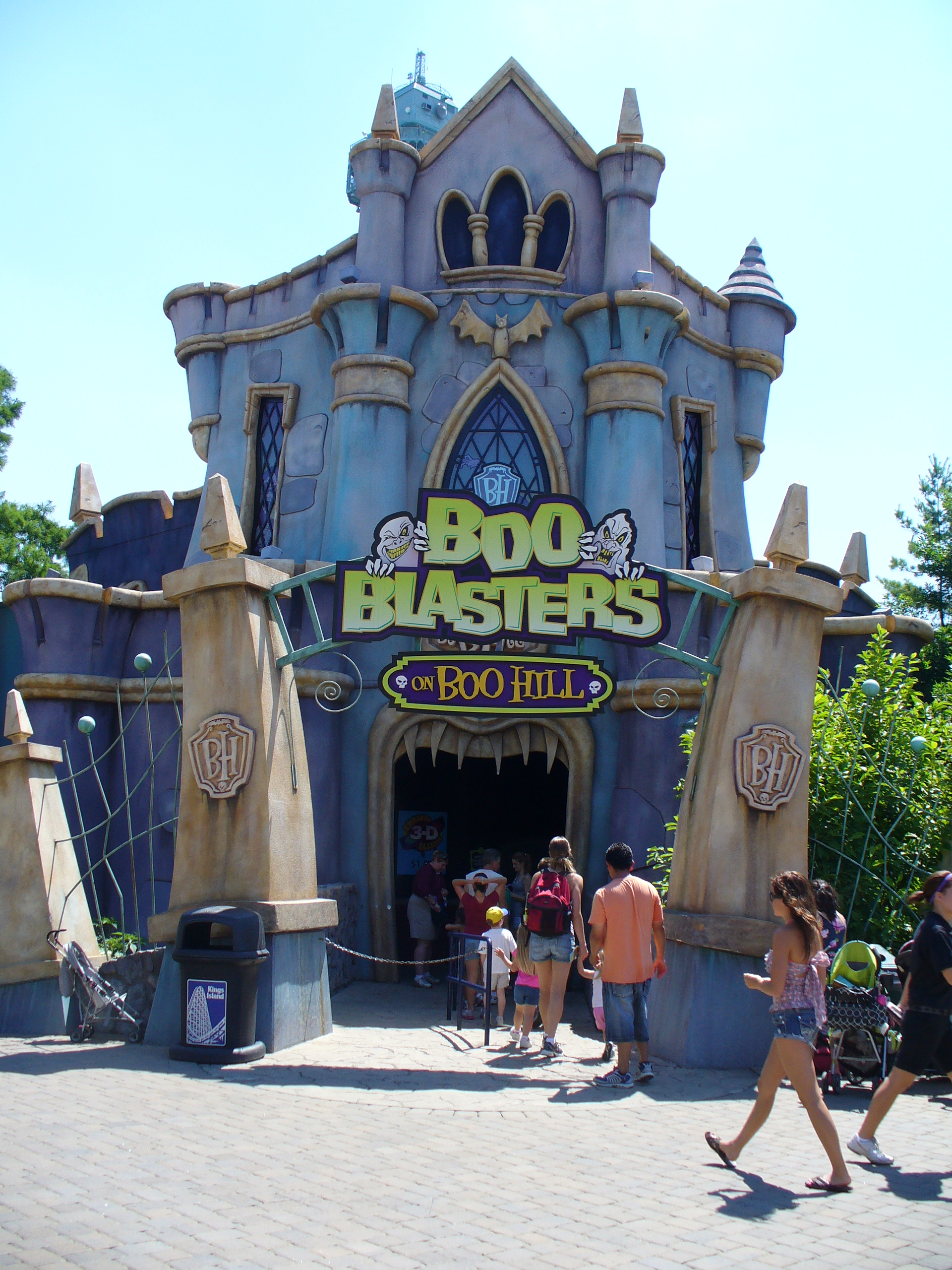
- Boo Blasters on Boo Hill at Kings Island

Canada's Wonderland
- Area: Planet Snoopy
- Status: Operating
- Opening date: May 2, 2010
- Replaced: Scooby-Doo's Haunted Mansion

Carowinds
- Area: Crossroads
- Status: Operating
- Opening date: March 27, 2010
- Replaced: Scooby-Doo's Haunted Mansion

Kings Dominion
- Area: Planet Snoopy
- Status: Operating
- Opening date: April 2, 2010
- Replaced: Scooby-Doo! and the Haunted Mansion

Kings Island
- Area: International Street
- Status: Removed
- Opening date: April 17, 2010
- Closing date: September 1, 2025
- Replaced: Scooby-Doo and the Haunted Castle
- Replaced by: Phantom Theater: Opening Nightmare

Ride statistics
- Attraction type: Interactive dark ride, haunted attraction
- Manufacturer: Sally Corporation
- Designer: Rich Hill, Senior Designer for Sally Corporation
- Model: Ghost Blasters
- Theme: Haunted attraction
- Fast Lane available at Carowinds
- Must transfer from wheelchair

Boo Blasters on Boo Hill is an interactive family dark ride designed and manufactured by Sally Corporation. The ride opened in 2010 at four Six Flags amusement parks — Canada's Wonderland, Carowinds, Kings Dominion, and formerly at Kings Island. The ride was a slight alteration and replacement of Scooby-Doo's Haunted Mansion after Cedar Fair (later merged into Six Flags) chose to remove all remaining Hanna-Barbera branding from each of their parks by 2010.

== History ==
In 2006, Cedar Fair purchased Paramount Parks from CBS. Several of the parks attained in the purchase – Canada's Wonderland, Carowinds, Kings Dominion, and Kings Island – had a dark ride from Sally Corporation themed to the company's Scooby-Doo's Haunted Mansion attraction model. During the 2009-2010 off-season, Cedar Fair began the process of removing Nickelodeon and Hanna-Barbera themes from their recently acquired amusement parks. For the Haunted Mansion rides, Sally Corporation was contracted to remove the Scooby-Doo theme and replace it with a new one. The new theme was called Boo Blasters on Boo Hill, which debuted at all four parks for the 2010 season.

== Ride experience ==
Boo Blasters on Boo Hill is a dark ride with individual ride vehicles on a track at Canada's Wonderland, Carowinds, and Kings Dominion, and formerly a continuous Omnimover-style ride system at Kings Island. Guests use mounted laser guns to fire at lighted targets throughout the ride. Hitting a target enables additional animation, sounds, and special effects, as well as earns each rider points that are tallied and displayed inside the vehicle. The ride layout and special effects varies at each park location. Initially, each park sold disposable ChromaDepth 3-D glasses at the ride's entrance to enhance the blacklight paint effects throughout the ride.

=== Kings Island ===
Guests entered the attraction through the front gates of an old Gothic castle. The queue took guests through the foyer into the first room, which featured large chandeliers, cob webs, and a haunting music track playing in the background. Before boarding the ride, guests walked through a corridor with boarded-up windows on both sides. Once in the vehicle, riders traveled through a haunted cemetery and mansion, filled with skeletons and ghosts. The final encounter was with Boocifer, the primary antagonist. The ride ended with a display that shows riders how well their score ranked before exiting the vehicle.

Although Kings Island's version of Boo Blasters was previously Scooby-Doo and the Haunted Castle, the ride system was originally used for Phantom Theater. Phantom Theater maintained the same ride system as its successors, but featured 55 ride vehicles and no interactive elements. The attraction ceased operation in 2002 and became transformed into Scooby-Doo and the Haunted Castle for the 2003 season.

On August 11th, 2025, Kings Island announced the closure of their Boo Blasters on Boo Hill on September 1st that year for future development. On August 28th, the park revealed that a revival of the former Phantom Theater attraction (which was previously located on the site that Boo Blasters later occupied), titled Phantom Theater: Opening Nightmare, had been in development and was scheduled to open by April 2026, taking the place of their Boo Blasters installation. Sally Dark Rides announced they will return to spearhead the design and construction of this replacement. On March 18th, 2026, a month before the park's 2026 season started, Kings Island held an auction for a majority of Boo Blasters props for just over a week, ending on March 27th. Some mechanical pieces from Boo Blasters that weren't auctioned off were recycled for the replacement attraction. Phantom Theater: Opening Nightmare officially began operations on April 18th, 2026.
