= Clifton Hill, Niagara Falls =

Tourist area in Niagara Falls, Ontario

Coordinates: 43.091245°N 79.074472°W

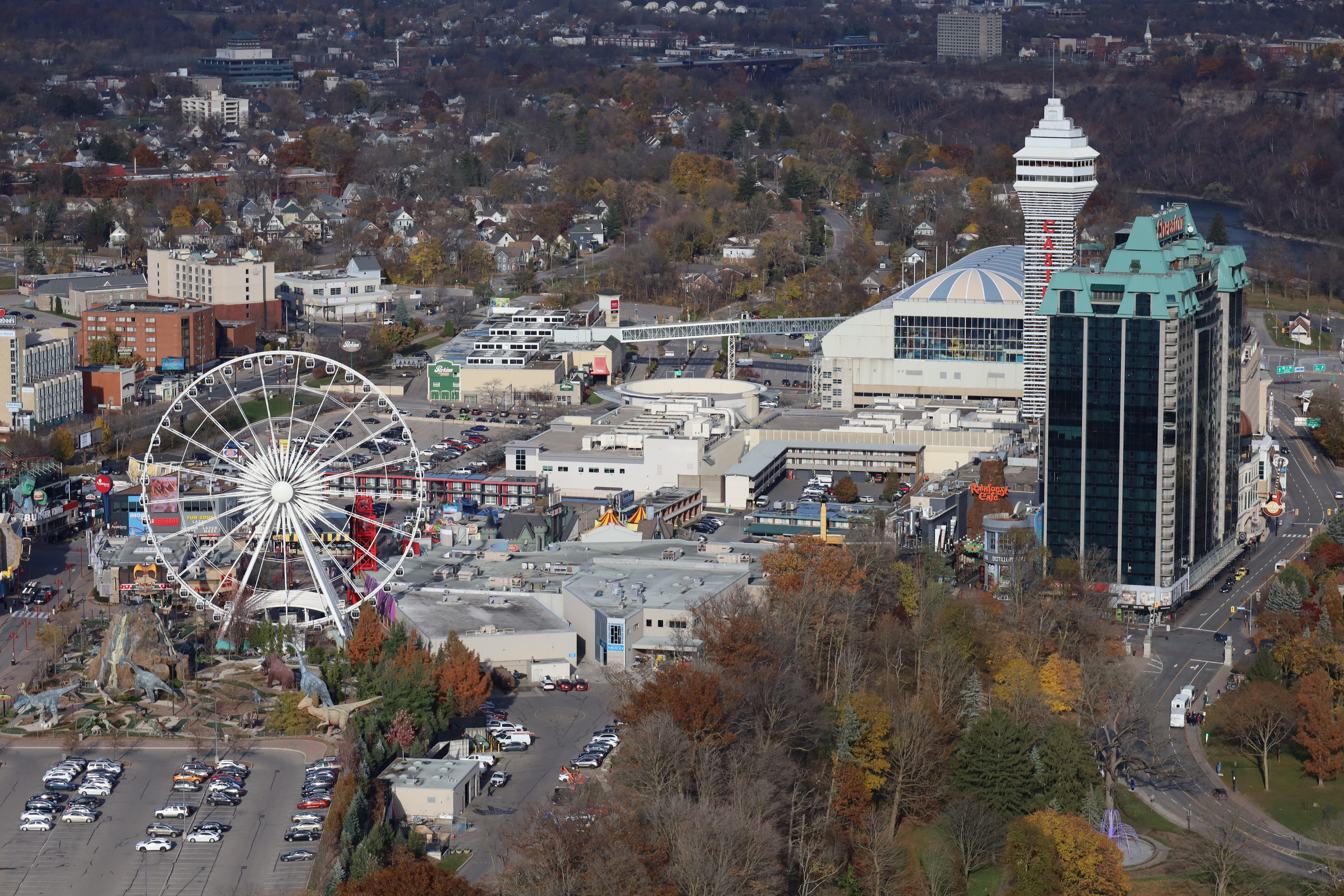
View of Clifton Hill from the Skylon Tower in 2023

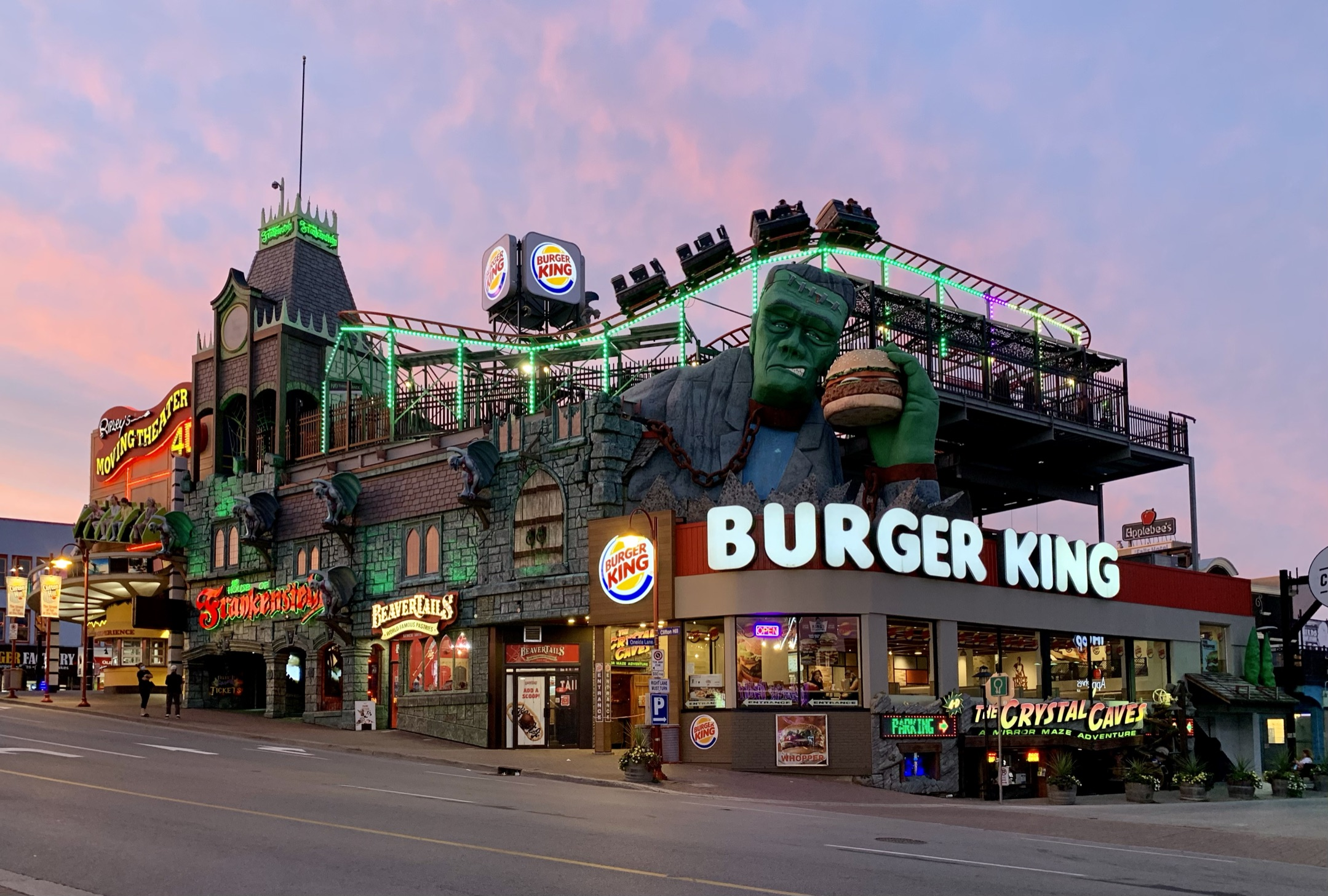
Burger King restaurant, Ripley's Moving Theatre, and the House of Frankenstein in Clifton Hill, 2021

Clifton Hill is one of the major tourist areas in Niagara Falls, Ontario. The street, close to Niagara Falls and the Niagara River, leads from River Road on the Niagara Parkway to intersect with Victoria Avenue, and contains a number of gift shops, wax museums, haunted houses, video arcades, restaurants, hotels and themed attractions. It is a major amusement area and centre for night life.

Properties on Clifton Hill are bought, sold and renamed frequently. The street is dominated by two primary property owners: the Harry Oakes Company (HOCO) and the Niagara Clifton Group.

Comfort Inn, also part of Clifton Hill, closed in 2015 and was later demolished as part of a major development that included the Niagara Speedway go-kart track, an extension of the Great Canadian Midway video arcade, a zombie-themed 4D ride (Now a 4D ride named "Creepy Castle"), multiple snack stands, and a Ripley's Believe It or Not! Museum expansion. The expansion began in early 2016 and was completed in the summer of 2018.

== History ==
=== Early history ===
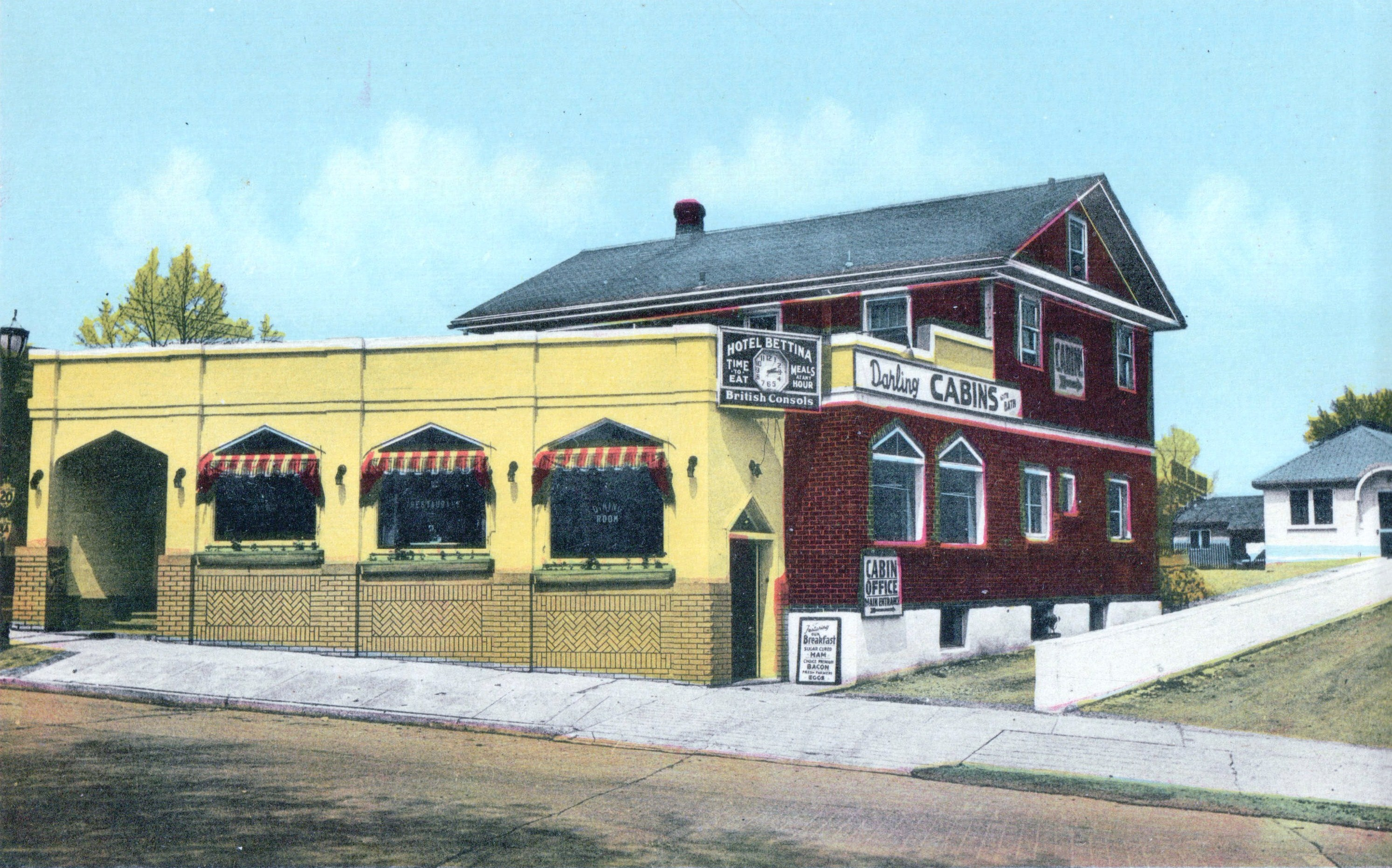
Darling Cabins and Hotel Bettina

The land now occupied by Clifton Hill was acquired by the Phillip Bender family in 1782, as part of a United Empire Loyalist land grant. In 1832 the property was purchased by British Army officer Captain Ogden Creighton, a half-pay officer who had served in the 70th and 81st Regiments. Creighton laid out streets and building lots on the land, naming the future settlement Clifton, presumably after Clifton on the gorge of the River Avon in Bristol, England. Creighton built his residence, Clifton Cottage, on the edge of a high bank facing the American Falls, on the site of the present-day Quality Inn.

Creighton was involved in suppressing the Rebellion of 1837. Following a clash between William Lyon Mackenzie and an Upper Canada government militia north of Toronto, the rebel leader took his forces to Navy Island on the Niagara River to form a provisional government. In mid-January 1838, Mackenzie and his followers evacuated the island. At the time Clifton Cottage became the headquarters for a military detachment which was assigned to guard the border ferry. The Creighton family left the Niagara area in the early 1840s, moving to Toronto and later Brantford, Ontario. Creighton died around 1850.

The street now called Clifton Hill was previously known as Ferry Road, named due to its proximity to the rowboat transportation system that ferried people across the Niagara River between Canada and the United States prior to the completion of the Niagara Falls Suspension Bridge. Ferry Road provided access to the Niagara Gorge where the boats docked.

In 1833 the first Clifton Hotel was built at the base of the street by Harmanus Crysler. Following in 1842, financier Samuel Zimmerman created a 52-acre (210,000 m^{2}) estate property along the south side of the road. Dubbed Clifton Place, Zimmerman planned to create many gardens, large fountains and a mansion that was to be his residence. The estate occupied the entire south side of what is now Clifton Hill, bounded by the Niagara River, Murray Hill and Ferry Road. Among the buildings constructed were four large gatehouses (the last was completed in 1856) and a $18,000 stable constructed of imported English yellow brick. In addition a fountain was created in the centre of the property.

Zimmerman was killed on March 12, 1857, in the Desjardins Canal railway accident. He only lived to see the foundations of his $175,000 "Clifton Place" mansion built. Only the fountain remains to this day, located at the northern end of Queen Victoria Park.

The Zimmerman estate was taken over by the Bank of Upper Canada, which went bankrupt in 1866. The estate was put up for sale and purchased by State Senator John T. Bush of Buffalo, New York for 25 cents on the dollar. Bush acquired Clifton House, the adjoining properties, and went on to complete the lavish Clifton Place mansion. Bush and his family lived in the building for the next 50 years, with his daughter Josephine residing there until 1927. In 1928 the Bush estate was sold to Harry Oakes of Welland Securities.

The first Clifton Hotel was destroyed by fire in 1898, and the ruins laid untouched until 1905, when the second Clifton House and Lafayette Hotel was built. Another fire broke out at the Clifton on December 31, 1932, and was again a total loss.

Harry Oakes bought this property and deeded it to the Niagara Parks Commission, which built Oakes Garden Theatre, opening in September 1937.

=== Clifton Hill as a tourist destination ===
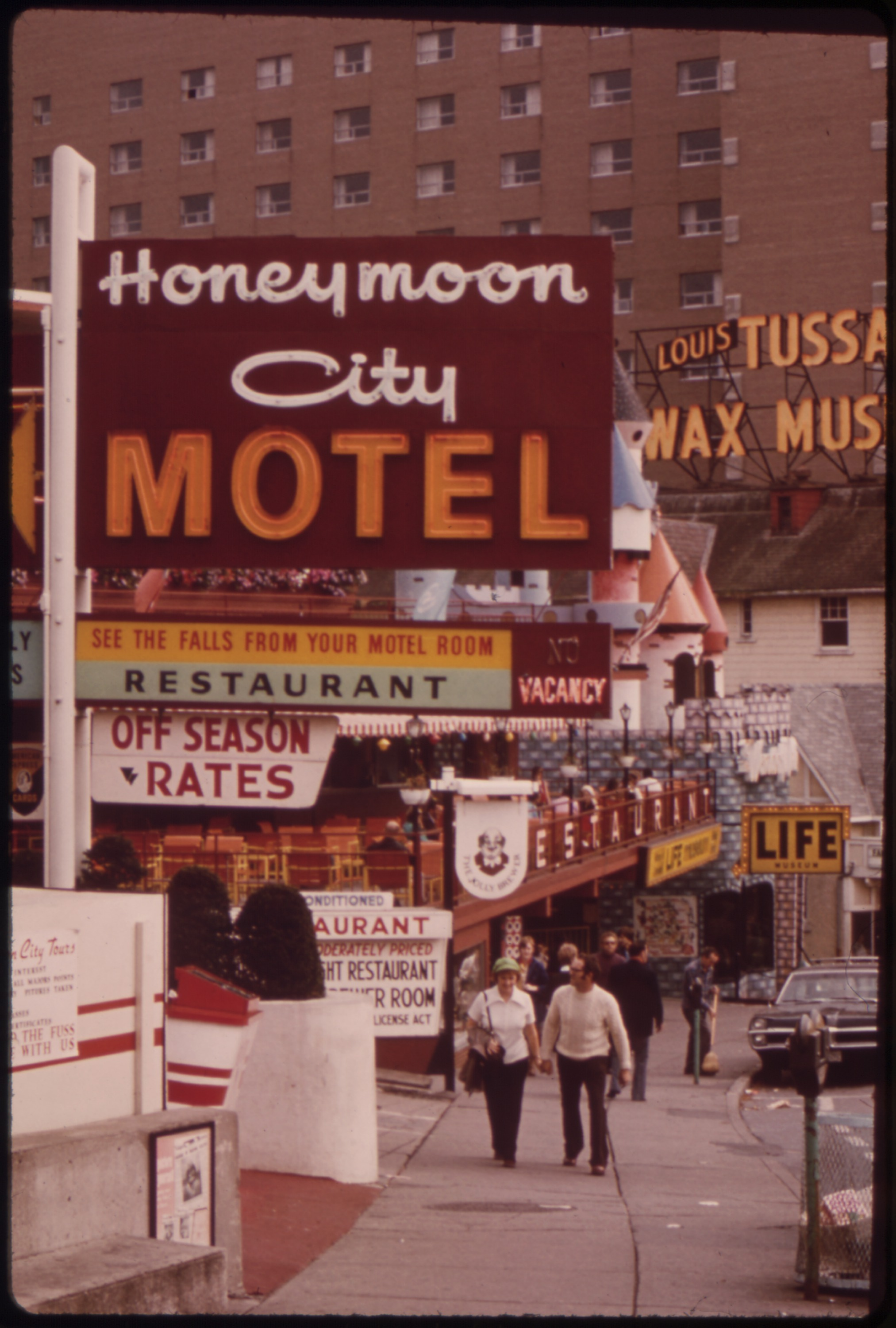
October 1973

The 1920s saw considerable growth in the area as a tourist destination. In 1925 Howard Fox opened the Foxhead Inn on Clifton Hill at Falls Avenue. On the north side of the hill the Niagara Falls Tourist Camp was opened by Charles Burland. Earl McIntosh opened two campgrounds, the Clifton Touring Camp on the south side of the street and Clifton Camp to the north. Reinhart's Riverhurst Inn was built between the Niagara Falls Tourist Camp and the Foxhead Inn.

In the 1950s the land on the south side of the street was offered to the Government of the United States as a site for a new American Consulate (Niagara was home to US Consul from 1899 to 1959), but the offer was never taken up, and the land was later sold. Two hotels opened in the 1950s that are still in operation today: the Park Motor Hotel and the Quality Inn Fallsway Hotel.

Beginning in the 1960s, Clifton Hill began to see various museums built, including the Houdini Hall of Fame, Ripley's Believe It or Not!, Louis Tussaud's Waxworks, House of Frankenstein, and the Guinness World Records museum.

== Attractions ==
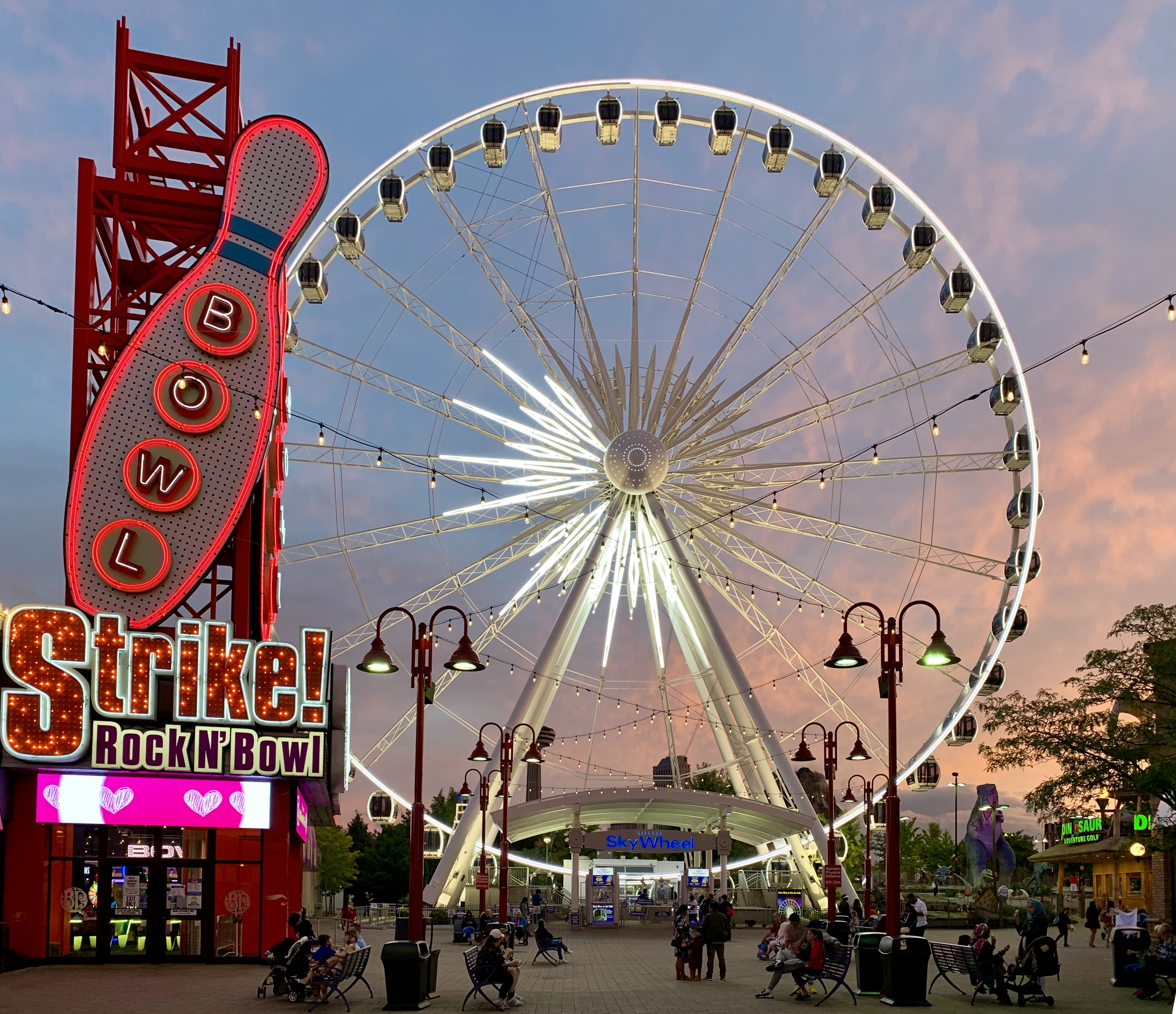
The Niagara SkyWheel and Strike! Rock N Bowl Entertainment Centre

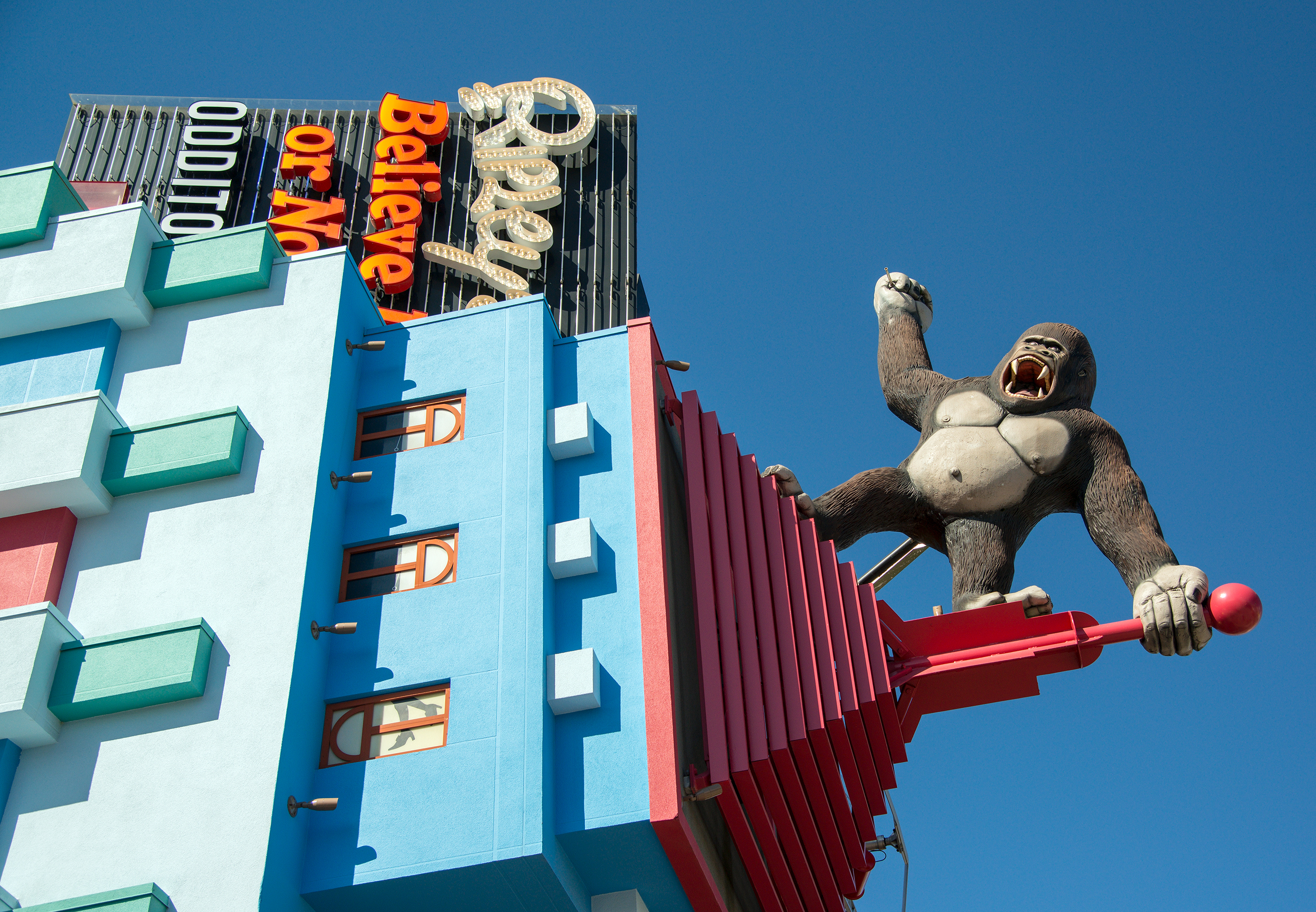
Ripley's Believe It Or Not! Odditorium, Clifton Hill, 2017

Prominent attractions on the street include the Niagara SkyWheel and the Ripley's Believe It or Not! Museum, which includes Ripley's Selfie Studios and Louis Tussaud's Waxworks, with a model of Charles Blondin that formerly hung above Clifton Hill and has since been moved to Victoria Ave and is a long-time local landmark. The street also features numerous 3D motion simulator rides. Ripley's Moving Theatre, the first to open in 1996, closed in early 2022 to make way for Ripley's Selfie Studios. Towards the bottom of the hill, located close to the Rainforest Café (the last remaining Canadian location) is a similar ride that has undergone multiple name changes. It was, for many years, home of SpongeBob SquarePants 4-D and, later, its successor, SpongeBob SquarePants 4D: The Great Jelly Rescue. It doesn't exist there anymore. The Great Canadian Midway arcade across the street, as well as the former Comfort Inn site behind the Believe It Or Not! museum, also contain similar rides. The Rides include, Ghost Blasters Dark Ride, a dark ride where riders shoot at ghosts, and Toy Store 4D, a motion theatre ride that was formerly cosmic coaster and wild west coaster, all 3 motion theatre rides made by Triotech with Ghost Blasters created by Sally Corporation

=== Wax museums ===
The first wax museum in Niagara Falls was Louis Tussaud's Waxworks, which opened in 1949. In September 2000, the museum left its original location towards the bottom of the hill, opening in a new location just above the hill on Victoria Avenue in 2005. The museum, the largest wax museum in Canada, imitates the wax museums of Louis Tussaud's great-grandmother Madame Tussaud, as the figures are placed within reach of its visitors. Figures represented in the museum include actors, music artists, politicians, fictional characters from film and television, and historical figures. Unlike its predecessor, the new location does not feature a torture chamber, but instead contains a gated section displaying characters from popular horror films.

Located at the bottom of Clifton Hill, across the street from the original Louis Tussauds, is the Movieland Wax Museum of the Stars, which displays celebrities from movies, music, and television. Unlike Louis Tussauds, where most of the figures are placed together in large galleries, the majority of the figures displayed here are in contained displays decorated to resemble famous movie scenes, and are dressed as their respective fictional characters. Most of the figures are behind glass or out of reach. At the end of the museum is an interactive hall of horrors that acts as a small haunted house attraction, complete with Horror movie characters from movies like Aliens and It and a mechanical replica of an electric chair that shakes and blows smoke. The museum's exit formerly ushered visitors into a wax hand studio and gift shop, which was removed during the COVID-19 lockdown, It now exits to a room with many figures from different superhero films and even a display for Pirates of the Caribbean. In 2005, the museum relocated out of what is now the glow-in-the-dark Wizard's Golf miniature golf to its present, larger location, which had been home to the now-closed Circus World arcade and gift shop from 1984 until 2001.

The Clifton Hill district has been home to a number of other, smaller wax museums in the past. The Rock Legends Wax Museum stood on the current site of the Locomoland Model Train Miniature World display, near the corner of Centre St and Victoria Ave, at the top of Clifton Hill. It featured over 70 musical (mostly rock and roll) artists from the 20th and 21st centuries. The museum exited into a rock music-themed gift shop called Rockworld, which still exists and displays some figurines from the former museum, which closed in late 2019.

The Criminals Hall of Fame Wax Museum, established in 1977, featured 40 wax figures of notorious criminal figures from history, such as Jack the Ripper and Elizabeth Báthory, as well as some fictional characters from horror movies. The attraction closed in 2014 and is now a discount souvenir store.

=== Miniature golf courses ===
Clifton Hill is home to Canada's largest mini-golf course, Dinosaur Adventure Golf, of 70,000 sq. ft. In close proximity is Wizards' Golf, an indoor, 18-hole, glow in the dark miniature golf course, Wild Safari Mini Putt, located inside Adventure City, and SkippArr's Pirate Putt, a glow-in-the-dark mini golf course that is pirate themed, It used to be Guinness World Records Museum.

=== Haunted houses ===
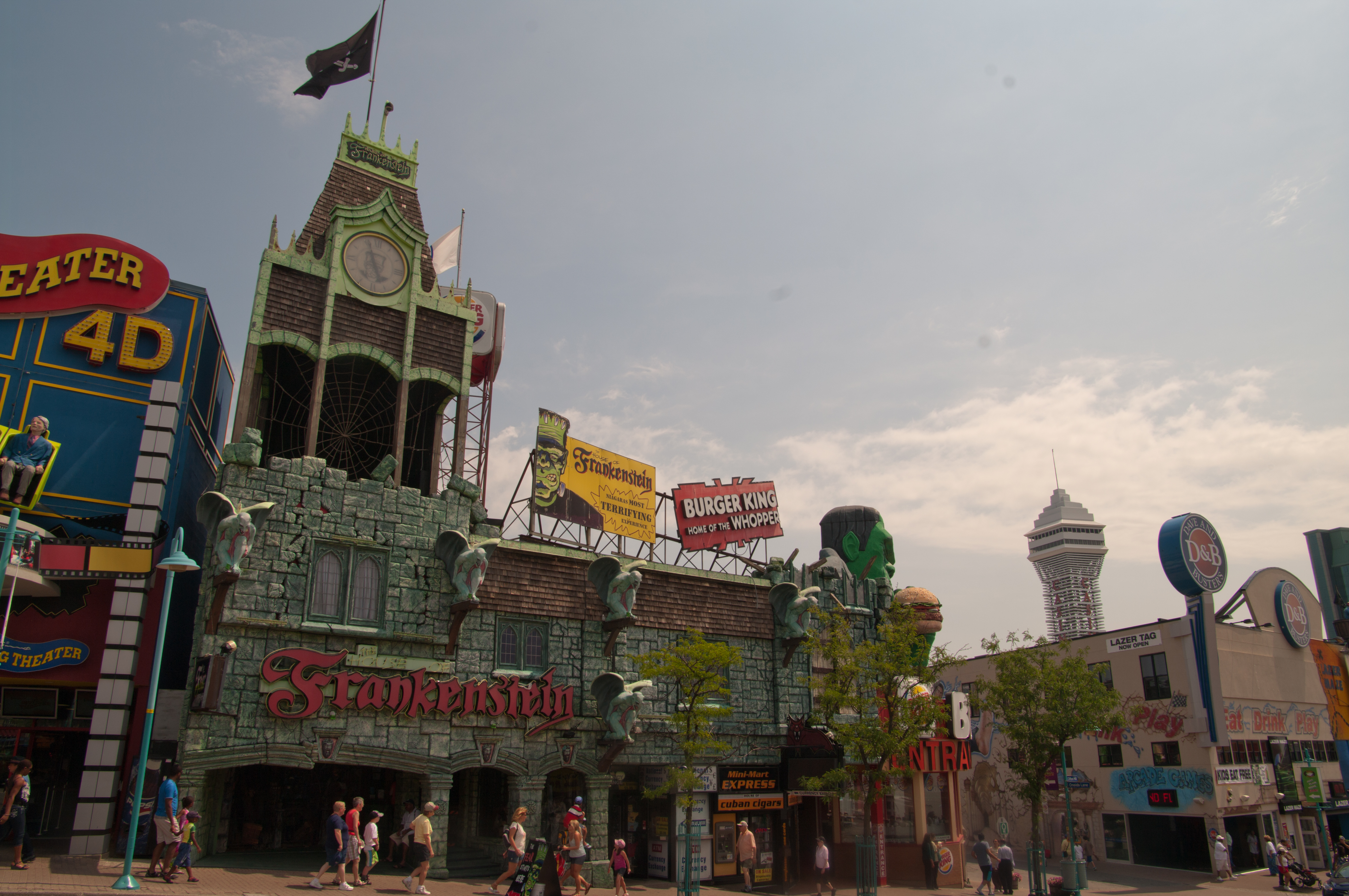
The House of Frankenstein

There are four year-round haunted houses in the Clifton Hill area. The House of Frankenstein, located next to Ripley's Selfie Studios, Dracula's Haunted Castle, next to the Big Top Entertainment Centre, and the Haunted House, are on Clifton Hill itself, while Nightmares Fear Factory is located on Victoria Avenue. Two additional haunted houses were previously located on Victoria Avenue: Screamers House of Horrors, which was renamed Haunted Asylum shortly before its closure in 2014, and Creatures of the Night, which had the same owners and acted as a second part of Screamers. Following the closure of Haunted Asylum, the building became a hybrid haunted house/zombie paintball shooting range known as Screaming Tunnels, named after the famously haunted tunnel of the same name in the northwest corner of Niagara Falls, but that attraction closed in 2018 and is now a complex containing a Popeyes and an Osmow's Shawarma restaurant. Creatures of the Night was replaced by a 4D theatre known as Dino Rampage 4D, and is now an Outback Steakhouse. There was previously another alien-themed haunted house known as Alien Encounter at the corner of Clifton Hill and Victoria Avenue. This attraction closed in 2006 and the site is now occupied by a currency exchange.

== In popular culture ==
The district is the setting of Albert Shin's 2019 thriller film Disappearance at Clifton Hill.
