= Phantom Theater: Opening Nightmare =

Dark ride at Kings Island

Kings Island
- Area: Planet Snoopy
- Coordinates: 39°20′36″N 84°16′06″W
- Status: Operating
- Soft opening date: April 16, 2026
- Opening date: April 18, 2026
- Replaced: Boo Blasters on Boo Hill

Ride statistics
- Attraction type: Interactive dark ride
- Manufacturer: Sally Dark Rides
- Theme: Haunted attraction
- Duration: 6 minutes (Note: According to Springfield News-Sun, "the experience lasts around six minutes, slightly longer than the first Phantom Theater".)
- Composer: John Citrone
- Website: Official website
- Fast Lane available at Kings Island

Phantom Theater: Opening Nightmare is an interactive dark ride at Kings Island in Mason, Ohio, United States. Developed by Sally Dark Rides with interactive technology supplied by Alterface, the attraction opened on April 18, 2026, replacing Boo Blasters on Boo Hill. It is a reimagining of Phantom Theater, which operated at the park from 1992 to 2002 in the same building.

Interest in the original Phantom Theater continued long after its closure. Its characters and themes briefly returned in Phantom Theater Encore, a live stage show presented in 2022 and 2023. Following the show's success, Kings Island announced Phantom Theater: Opening Nightmare in August 2025. Designers developed a new storyline featuring both new and returning characters rather than reconstructing the original ride. The existing Omnimover-style ride system and general track configuration were retained, while the interior was rebuilt with new scenery, animatronics, and interactive projection effects.

Set inside a haunted opera house, the storyline follows organist Maestro after a lightning strike scatters enchanted "ghost notes" throughout the theater. Riders use handheld flashlights to capture the projected notes for points. The attraction contains 33 animatronics across 26 scenes and lasts approximately six minutes. Reviews praised its nostalgic references to the original, updated animatronics, and interactive qualities, while also noting its lighter tone and the potential for gameplay to detract from the story.

== History ==
Phantom Theater: Opening Nightmare occupies a building that originally housed Enchanted Voyage, an indoor boat ride featuring Hanna-Barbera characters. Constructed for Kings Island's grand opening in 1972, Enchanted Voyage was later rethemed as Smurf's Enchanted Voyage in 1984. In 1992, the attraction underwent a major transformation to become Phantom Theater, during which the boat conveyance system was replaced by a new ride system manufactured by D. H. Morgan Manufacturing. Morgan's continuous ride system drew inspiration from Disney's Omnimover design, popularized by attractions such as The Haunted Mansion.

After Phantom Theater closed in 2002, Kings Island partnered with Sally Dark Rides to convert the attraction into Scooby-Doo! and the Haunted Castle for the 2003 season. Light guns and targets introduced interactive gameplay, while the existing ride system was retained. Kings Island changed ownership in 2006 when Cedar Fair acquired Paramount Parks in a $1.24 billion deal. The company began removing licensed intellectual property introduced during the Paramount era and later declined to renew its license with Warner Bros. Animation for the use of Scooby-Doo! Mystery Incorporated. To replace the Scooby-Doo theming, Kings Island again hired Sally Dark Rides, and the attraction reopened in 2010 as Boo Blasters on Boo Hill.

In the years after Phantom Theater's closure, interest in the former ride remained strong, with the attraction developing a dedicated fan following. Phantom Theater continued to resurface in Kings Island retrospectives and special events. During the annual Halloween Haunt event, props and animatronics from the retired ride were periodically displayed. Ken Parks, vice president of creative development for Six Flags, said Phantom Theater consistently ranked near the top among retired attractions that guests wanted to see return. In a 2022 interview, Rick Bastrup, lead designer of the original Phantom Theater, expressed pride that the ride's original characters remained popular with fans decades later.

During the 2022 and 2023 seasons, Kings Island presented Phantom Theater Encore, a live stage show that revived characters and themes from the original attraction. The production placed fourth in the "Best New Show" category at the 2022 Golden Ticket Awards, and its success helped make the case for reviving Phantom Theater as a ride.

=== Development and opening ===
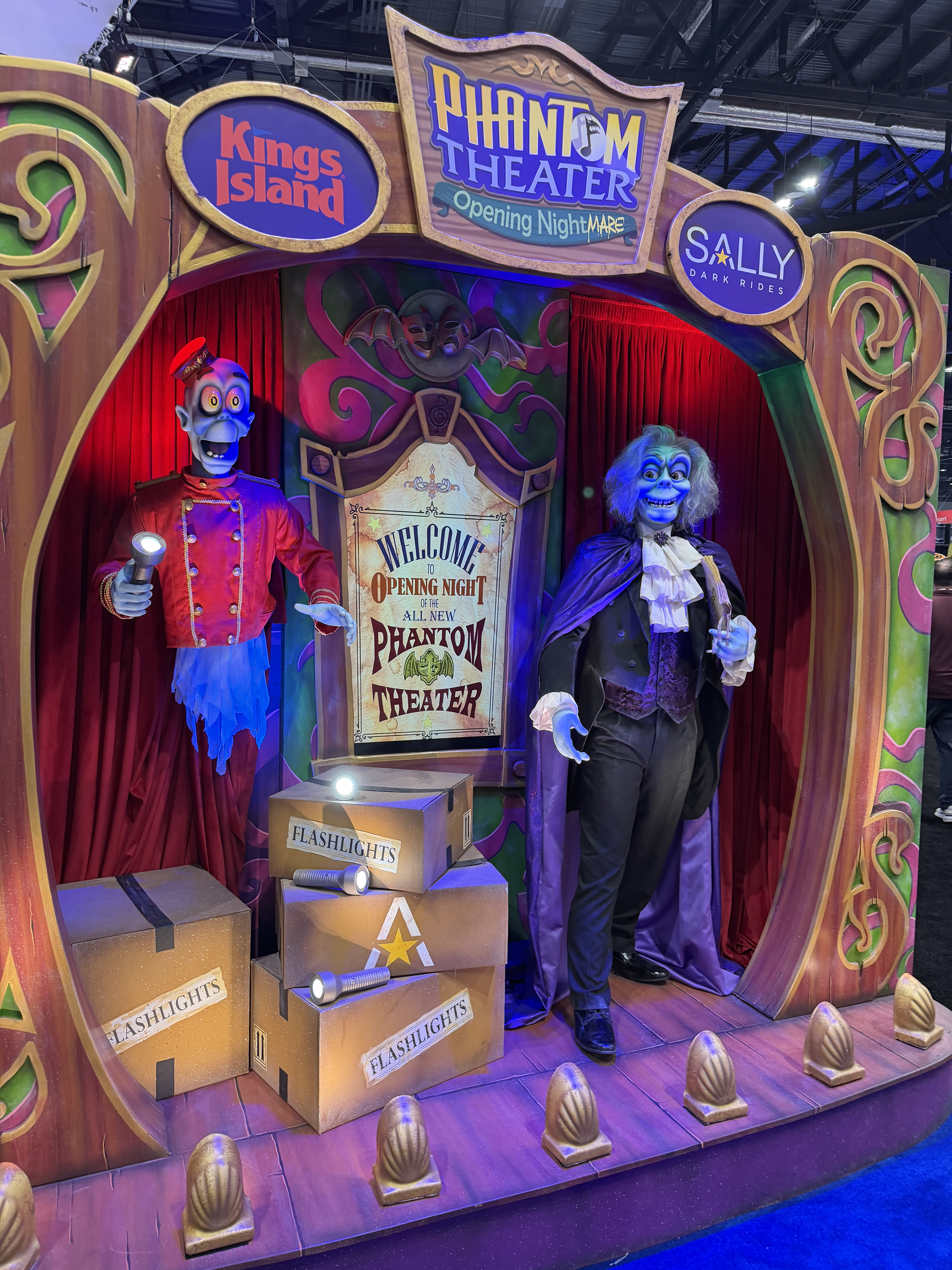
Opening Nightmare booth at IAAPA Expo (2025)

For the ride's return, Kings Island and Sally Dark Rides sought to create an entirely new attraction and storyline while paying homage to the original. Alterface supplied the interactive technology while Sally developed the attraction's story and design. Returning characters, including Maestro, No Legs Larry, Hilda Bovine, and the Great Garbanzo, were reimagined alongside new characters as part of an original narrative. The attraction was designed to appeal to both longtime fans and newer generations.

On August 28, 2025, Kings Island announced Phantom Theater: Opening Nightmare, a new interactive dark ride scheduled to debut during the park's 2026 season. The attraction would replace Boo Blasters on Boo Hill, which operated for more than 15 years before permanently closing on September 1, 2025.

On November 19, 2025, Kings Island and Sally Dark Rides unveiled animatronic figures of Maestro and No Legs Larry at IAAPA Expo in Orlando, Florida. The unveiling provided the first public look at the redesigned characters, who interacted with each other during the presentation, highlighting the attraction's updated animatronics. Tony Clark, regional manager of public relations for Six Flags, also revealed the interactive "spellbound flashlight" technology at the event.

Kings Island held a media preview event for Phantom Theater: Opening Nightmare on April 16, 2026. The attraction officially opened to the public two days later on April 18, coinciding with the beginning of the park's 55th season.

== Ride description ==
Phantom Theater: Opening Nightmare is an indoor haunted attraction designed as a ghost-filled opera house. The storyline centers on Maestro, the theater's longtime organist, who is preparing for a performance when a lightning strike releases enchanted "ghost notes" from his pipe organ and scatters them throughout the theater. Head usher No Legs Larry recruits guests to capture the notes with "spellbound flashlights" and return them to the organ before the performance begins. Other performers, including the Great Garbanzo and Hilda Bovine, prepare to take the stage amid the disruption.

The dark ride features 33 animatronics across 26 scenes. The attraction combines three-dimensional scenery with animatronics, video displays, lighting effects, and projection mapping for the interactive targeting system, as well as "wind and scent" 4D effects. Additional sensory effects include changes in temperature and sudden flashes of light.

=== Experience ===
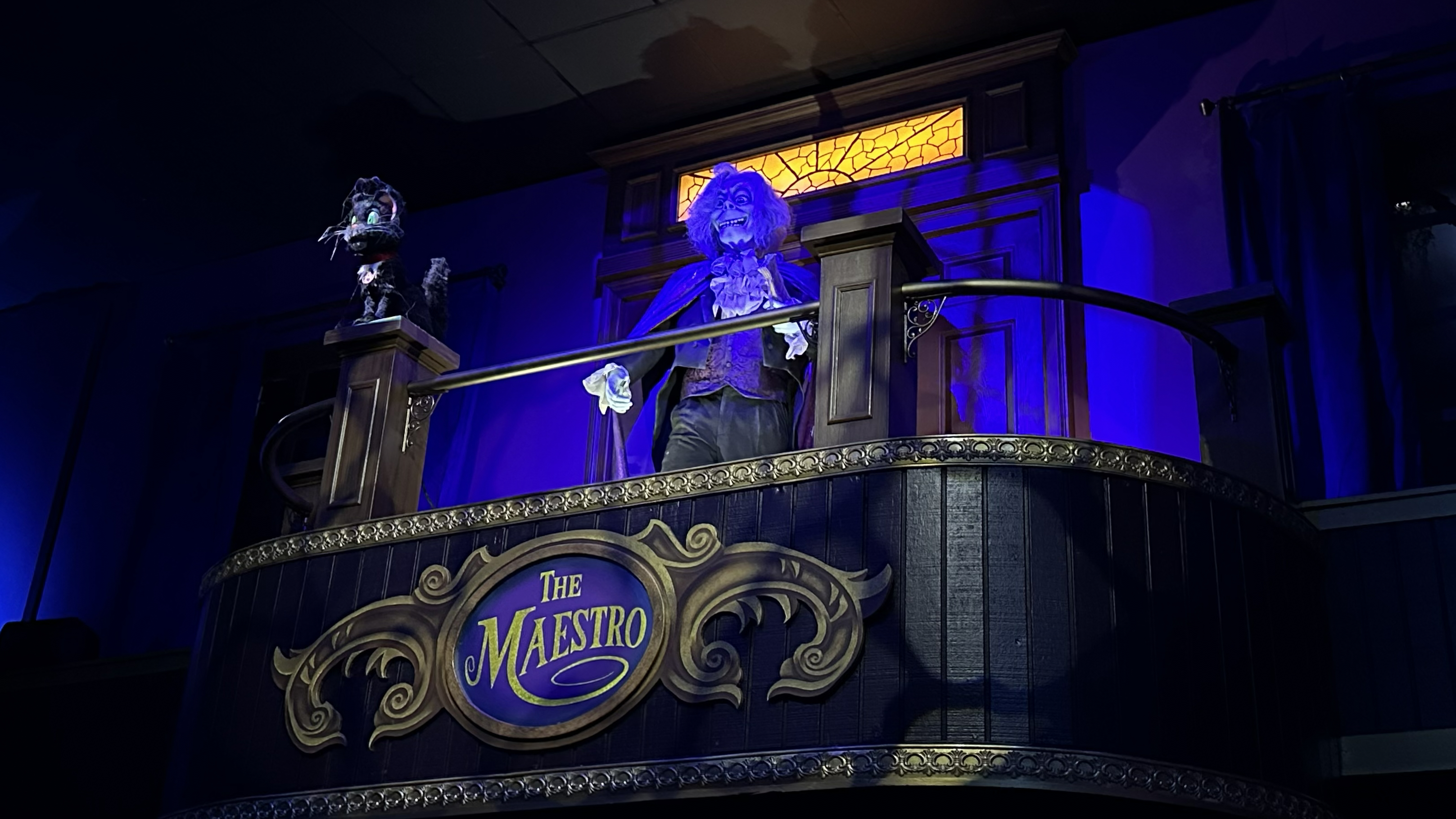
Animatronics of Maestro and Arpeggio overlooking the line queue

After entering, guests pass through a preshow queue featuring animatronic figures of Maestro, his cat Arpeggio, and No Legs Larry. Guests then board vehicles themed as opera boxes and use tethered flashlights to capture projected ghost notes for points. The interactive system replaces the small, fixed physical targets previously used in Boo Blasters on Boo Hill.

Early in the ride, guests encounter members of the theater's cast preparing for the performance, then travel through the prop room, backstage spaces, haunted corridors, dressing rooms, and the boiler room. Several settings associated with characters from the original Phantom Theater were reimagined for the new storyline using modern technology. In one sequence, Hilda Bovine's singing appears to shatter several mirror-like screens, recalling a similar scene in the original attraction. Additional references to the original Phantom Theater, Boo Blasters on Boo Hill, and other Kings Island dark rides are hidden throughout the attraction as Easter eggs.

A complete ride cycle lasts approximately six minutes. It concludes with an onstage musical finale featuring Maestro and the rest of the cast. After Maestro thanks riders, a display sign shows how each rider's score ranks.

=== Characters ===
Several performers from the original attraction return, along with two new characters: Arpeggio and Sir Pretzel.

- Maestro – The theater's longtime organist, music arranger, and talent manager, who oversees an eccentric company of performers. In the new storyline, the ghost notes escape from his pipe organ shortly before a scheduled performance.
- No Legs Larry – The theater's head usher, identified simply as The Usher in the original attraction. He recruits guests to retrieve the escaped notes using the spellbound flashlights.
- Hilda Bovine – An opera singer who originally starred at the Berlin Theater and whose exceptionally high notes can shatter mirrors.
- The Great Garbanzo – A daredevil performer whose acts involve dangerous stunts with cannons and explosives.
- Houdelini – A magician known for his floating cards and pulling a troublesome rabbit from his hat.
- Lionel Burymore – A former theatrical star who wanders the opera house reciting passages from Macbeth.
- Arpeggio – Maestro's feline companion and a new character introduced in Phantom Theater: Opening Nightmare.
- Sir Pretzel – A newly introduced contortionist, billed as "the Human Knot". (Note: Signage near the attraction's entrance identifies Sir Pretzel as "the Human Knot".) The character references the Pretzel Amusement Ride Company, an early dark ride manufacturer well known for its use of pretzel-shaped weights on ride vehicles.
- Rick the Electrician – Originally named Gus, he maintains the theater's aging lighting system despite frequently overloading its circuits. The character was renamed in honor of the ride's original designer, Rick Bastrup.

=== Design and characteristics ===
Phantom Theater: Opening Nightmare retains the Omnimover-style transport system and track configuration used in Boo Blasters on Boo Hill. The existing vehicles were refurbished to resemble opera boxes and grouped in pairs, with additional spacing between each pair to provide time for the show scenes to reset. Although the existing floor plan was largely preserved, the interior was stripped and rebuilt with new scenery, animatronics, and themed environments.

Sally Dark Rides oversaw creative development from scenic design to character fabrication, animation, and installation. The design team created detailed storyboards for each of the 26 scenes. Drew Hunter, vice president of creative design at Sally Dark Rides, said the "biggest challenge was capturing the feeling of the old ride". Instead of reconstructing the 1992 attraction scene by scene, the team developed a new storyline while reworking settings from the original attraction, including Hilda Bovine's dressing room, Houdelini's performance area, and the boiler room. Other contributors included Bastrup, Techni-Lux, Pure Imagination, and composer John Citrone, who wrote and recorded a score containing musical references to the original attraction.

Alterface supplied a high-precision interactive pointing system with response times as low as 30 milliseconds. Hunter described avoiding distinct screens as an important design goal, opting to project moving ghost notes directly onto walls, sets, and other scenic surfaces to "make the gameplay area endless". Each flashlight casts a wide beam in the same color as the rider's score display and provides haptic feedback when a note is captured. The gameplay was designed to be optional so that guests could experience a "complete ride" even when the flashlights are not used.

== Reception ==
Andy Guinigundo of Attractions Magazine praised the attraction's animatronics, physical scenery, moving projected targets, color-coded flashlights, and family-friendly tone, concluding that it honored the original while providing a modern dark ride experience. Jeff Suess of The Cincinnati Enquirer called it "a significant upgrade from the original", citing its greater emphasis on storytelling and theming, expressive animatronics, and three-dimensional sets. Suess noted, however, that longtime fans might miss the darker tone of the original and that riders concentrating on the interactive gameplay could overlook details of the story.

Nick Weisenberger of Coaster101 described Opening Nightmare as "probably the most user-friendly interactive dark ride I've experienced" and called it his favorite of the four versions that have used the building's ride system. He praised its lightweight flashlights, visible aiming beams, haptic feedback, and replay value, although he identified its reduced capacity – compared with the original – and relatively easy gameplay as potential drawbacks. John Gregory of Theme Park Tribune awarded the attraction a B+ and praised its original characters, animatronics, physical sets, and expanded worldbuilding as a substantial improvement over Boo Blasters on Boo Hill. Although he criticized the storyline's rapid pace and noted intermittent problems with the flashlights, Gregory described the attraction as "genuinely fresh and charming" and felt the issues with interactivity did not significantly detract from the experience.
