= Reese's Xtreme Cup Challenge =

Former ride at Hersheypark

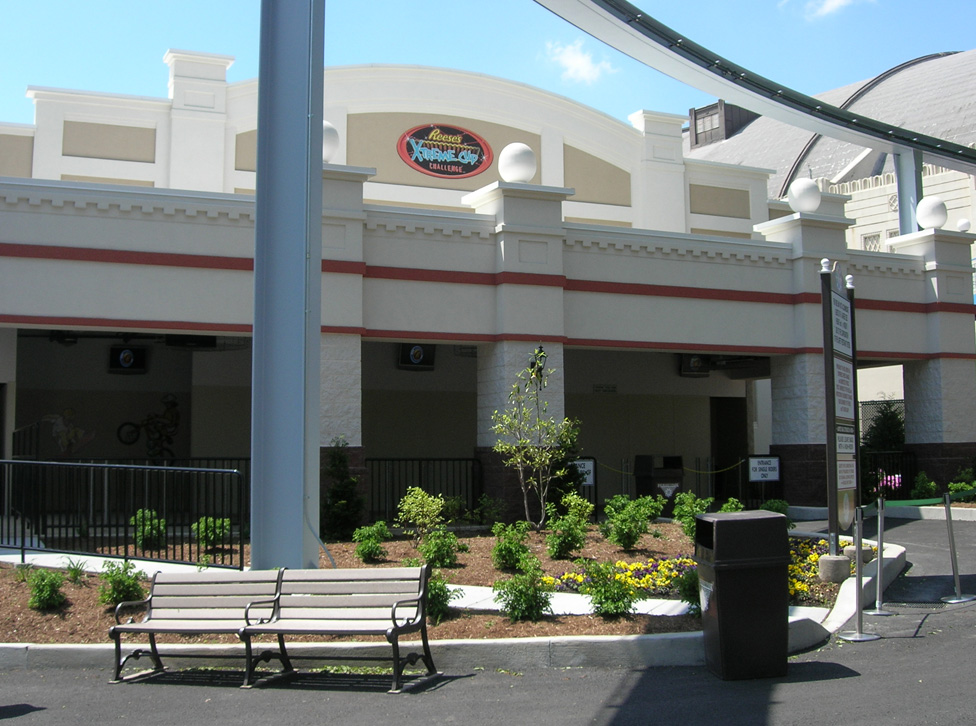
- Show building

Hersheypark
- Area: Founder's Way - Der Deitsch Platz
- Status: Closed
- Opening date: 2006
- Closing date: September 3, 2018
- Replaced by: Reese's Cupfusion

Ride statistics
- Attraction type: Dark ride
- Manufacturer: Sally Corporation
- Theme: Sports, Rock music, Candy
- Vehicles: 14
- Riders per vehicle: 4
- Rows: 2
- Riders per row: 2
- Single rider line available

Reese's Xtreme Cup Challenge (RXCC) was an attraction which was installed in 2006 at Hersheypark, where it became the first competitive, interactive dark ride. It was built by Sally Corporation, a popular dark ride manufacturer. The ride experience theme was sports, and the building exterior was themed on the Hersheypark Arena which is directly behind, outside Hersheypark. This ride is not to be confused with the free Hershey's Chocolate World tour ride. The ride replaced a building which housed the park's first aid and ride department offices, as well as a practice skating rink.

On August 2, 2018, Hersheypark announced the addition of Reese's Cupfusion for the Summer of 2019, which will replace Reese's Xtreme Cup Challenge. Reese's Xtreme Cup Challenge closed on September 3, 2018.

== Ride Facts ==
- Ride system provided by EOS Rides
- Ride featured a Single Rider line
- Total number of targets: 158
- Total animated elements: 80
- Animatronic figures: 8
