= Criminals Hall of Fame =

Coordinates: 43.091879°N 79.076516°W

- Official Criminals Hall of Fame logo
- Established: 1977
- Dissolved: 2014
- Location: Niagara Falls, Ontario, Canada
- Type: Wax museum
- Collection size: 40 statues
- Visitors: 10000+ per year
- Public transit access: Niagara Falls Transit
- Website: Official website

The Criminals Hall of Fame Wax Museum was a wax museum on 5751 Victoria Avenue in Niagara Falls, Ontario, Canada. One of many wax museums in the region, it was located at the top of Clifton Hill. The museum featured forty wax statues of notorious criminals, from mobsters to serial killers. The museum was created in 1977 and closed late 2014.

In 2002, columnist Gene Collier of the Pittsburgh Post-Gazette characterized the museum as "a cheesy little monument to brutality," while in 2005, the same paper's Dennis Roddy called it "a garish little exhibit." In 2003, the Boston Herald dubbed it "tacky." In 2010, Doug Kirby's roadsideamerica.com noted in its review that the museum had "more gore than most horror wax museums and better lighting, too," which it took as "a good indication that this attraction is drawing enough of a crowd to pay its electric bill."

== Statues ==
Among the museum's featured criminals are contemporary serial killers such as Ted Bundy, Jeffrey Dahmer, John Wayne Gacy and Charles Manson, which are interspersed with infamous historical figures like Billy the Kid, Pretty Boy Floyd, Clyde Chestnut Barrow, Lucky Luciano, Jesse James, Al Capone and Elizabeth Báthory. In 1999, the figure of Adolf Hitler was stolen from its glass case.
