= Reese's Cupfusion =

Ride at Hersheypark

Hersheypark
- Area: Founder's Way - Der Deitsch Platz
- Status: Operating
- Replaced: Reese's Xtreme Cup Challenge

Ride statistics
- Attraction type: Dark ride
- Manufacturer: Sally Corporation
- Theme: Candy, factory

Reese's Cupfusion is a shooting interactive dark ride that began operation on Saturday May 25, 2019 at Hersheypark. The ride features a turbulent journey through the Reese’s Central to stop Mint and his misfit candies from stealing the Crystal Cup that collects Reese’s Spirit. It was conceptualized and designed by Raven Sun Creative and is being built by Sally Corporation, the same manufacturer as that of Reese's Cupfusion's predecessor, Reese's Xtreme Cup Challenge, which closed on September 3, 2018.

== Ride experience ==
Riders take on the role of security agents at Reese's Central. Led by Commander Cup and Agent 55, the riders keep the factory running by protecting the Reese's Crystal Cup. The cup collects people's love of chocolate and peanut butter known as Reese’s Spirit and creates energy that powers the factory. Mint the Merciless and his league of misfit candy try to steal it so they can use it for their own evil purposes. The riders' job is to fight back and to ensure that the world is never deprived of Reese’s.

Riders board Reese's Transport seated two people per row. The ride begins as riders enter the Reese's Training Area, where Commander Cup and Agent 55 can be seen instructing guests to target the power ports, blasting at cardboard cutouts and crudely drawn images of misfit candies amid flashing red lights. Seconds after their training's begun, the alarm starts to sound, with flashing lights (where the on ride photo is taken). Commander Cup informs, "The factory has been breached. This is not a drill. I repeat, not a drill!" Riders go down a steep hill in a long hallway, revealing that the league of misfit candies used a drill to break through the wall to get into the factory.

In the next scene, guests enter the heart of the factory, with several cardboard cutouts and screens throughout the walls, where the Crystal Cup can be seen. Mint the Merciless snatches it and riders are tasked to chase after him because without the cup, the "factory has no power. We need your Reese's spirit." However, because the Crystal Cup is absorbing the energy, Mint the Merciless cannot be stunned by guests. Mint uses an explosive device to break through another wall so that he can escape. Riders continue to chase Mint while they can see the league of Misfit Candies swinging on claws, and messing with the machines.

Riders then chase Mint into the Seasonal Foundry, where candies being made for certain holidays like Valentine's Day, Easter, Halloween and Christmas were seen. As riders go down another steep hill, they continue to chase down Mint, and shoot all the misfit candies. Riders then enter the lab of the factory, where Mint was searching for potions. He sarcastically claim that he is trapped and has been defeated, however, he created a "secret game plan" to create a giant gum monster to destroy the factory, and escape. Riders are instructed by Commander Cup and Agent 55, to not let him get away and show him what they were made of.

Riders then enter the final scene, the showdown where they chase after Mint, and the gum monster so that they don't escape the factory. The gum monster runs destroying everything in the lab, and creating obstacles to try and block the guests from chasing them. Commander Cup exclaims to "aim for the mint on the monster's body," because the monster is made out of gum. Now, with riders blasting as much as they can, the monster begins to inflate, until it pops. (Which trigger hidden air cannons at riders)

Returning back to the load area, a screen plays Commander Cup and Agent 55 and a claw machine returning the Crystal Cup, "back where it belongs." The league of misfit candies can be seen trapped in the remaining pieces of the gum monster across the walls, as well as Mint The Merciless trapped as well. Riders can then view their final scores, and the Reese's Hall of Fame board, while the Reese's Transport returns to the load area.
