= Castle Park (amusement park) =

Amusement park in Riverside, California, US

- Previously known as Castle Amusement Park (1976-2001)
- Interactive map of Castle Park
- Location: Riverside, California, United States
- Coordinates: 33°54′10″N 117°28′06″W
- Opened: 1976
- Owner: Lucky Strike Entertainment Corporation
- Operating season: Year Round
- Area: 25 acres (10 ha)

Attractions
- Total: 21
- Roller coasters: 1
- Website: Castle Park

Castle Park, formerly Castle Amusement Park, is a 25-acre amusement park and family amusement center located in Riverside, California. The park utilizes a medieval "castle" theme and includes attractions such as a miniature golf course, arcade, and 21 amusement rides including one roller coaster, Merlin's Revenge, a junior rollercoaster. The main "castle" themed building, houses the arcade. The park was designed, built and operated by Bud Hurlbut, who designed several rides at Knott's Berry Farm. Castle Park is currently owned and operated by Lucky Strike Entertainment Corporation.

== History ==
The park opened in 1976 as a family entertainment center, featuring a castle themed building housing a large two-level video game arcade, and an outdoor miniature golf course. In 1985, the park expanded by adding an adjacent amusement ride area, featuring a collection of classic rides such as a Dentzel carousel built in 1905, a miniature railroad, and the Saw Mill Plunge log flume ride, thus becoming a legitimate amusement park.

In 1999, the park opened Ghost Blasters, an interactive dark ride designed by Sally Corporation. The ride features laser guns which riders use to shoot at targets to accumulate points. The attraction is the park's first and only dark ride, and occupies the entire second floor of the former arcade area inside the main castle building, reducing the arcade to only the first floor.

In 2008, the park opened "Dragon Flyer", a spinning flat ride, and "Screamin' Demon", a spinning wild mouse rollercoaster.

On May 25, 2019, a woman was critically injured and her husband and child suffered less-severe injuries when the log ride malfunctioned and threw them into the water. The guests recovered mostly from their injuries.

In early 2025, the park was sold to Herschend Family Entertainment. Herschend sold the park to Lucky Strike Entertainment Corporation two months later in July 2025.

On October 5, 2026, it was announced that the ride section of Castle Park would close on November 1 after that year's Castle Dark, with the closing ceremony of the event featuring the appearances of the park's characters, Merlin and Duke the Dragon. The park's arcade, mini golf, and Buccaneer Cove remain in operation, with the water park reopening in Summer 2027.

== Attractions ==
Rides:

- Antique Car Ride
- Bumper Cars
- Castle Park Railroad - A 2 ft (610 mm) narrow gauge railroad.
- Dragon Flyer - A "flying" ride.
- Dragons Tower - A vertical drop ride.
- Fireball - A looping ride.
- Flying Animals - A "Dumbo" style flat ride.
- Flying Saucer - A spinning gravity ride (a Gravitron).
- Kings Crown - A swing ride.
- Sawmill Plunge - A log flume ride.
- Merlin's Revenge - A junior rollercoaster.
- Merry-Go-Round - A Dentzel Carousel built in 1907.
- Riverside Express - A 14 in (356 mm) gauge ridable miniature train ride.
- Rockin' Tug
- Scrambler
- Sea Dragon - A swinging ship.
- Sea planes - A children's flat ride.
- Spaceships - A children's flat ride.
- Tilt-a-Whirl
- Whip - A centrifugal ride.

Other Attractions:

- Buccaneer Cove - A water play area.
- Arcade - A video game arcade also housing the "Ghost Blasters" attraction.
- Miniature Golf - An 18-hole miniature golf course area.
- The Big Top - A private parties facility.

Former Attractions:

- Ghost Blasters - An interactive Dark ride located in the arcade.
- Little Dipper - A children's rollercoaster.
- Motorcycles
- Falling Star - A rotating pendulum ride
- Thunderbolt
- Trabant
- Ferris Wheel
- Tornado Coaster - Zamperla Powered Kiddie Coaster
- Cyclone Racer - Musik Express
- Samba - A children's helicopter ride
- Screamin' Demon
- Go Karts - Was originally part of the "Big Top" area. Its former site is now occupied by "Screamin' Demon".
