= Phantom Theater (1992–2002) =

Former dark ride at Kings Island

Kings Island
- Area: Hanna-Barbera Land
- Status: Removed
- Opening date: April 11, 1992
- Closing date: July 14, 2002
- Replaced: Smurf's Enchanted Voyage
- Replaced by: Scooby-Doo and the Haunted Castle

Ride statistics
- Attraction type: Dark ride / Haunted attraction
- Manufacturer: D. H. Morgan Manufacturing
- Model: Omnimover
- Vehicles: 55
- Riders per vehicle: 3
- Duration: 5 minutes

Phantom Theater was a dark ride located at Kings Island in Mason, Ohio, United States. Manufactured by Morgan Manufacturing, the ride opened to the public on April 11, 1992. Its design incorporated a continuously moving chain of vehicles similar to Disney's Omnimover ride system. The attraction was furnished with sets and characters created by R&R Creative Amusement Designs, Inc., and it was themed as a haunted, abandoned theater.

Phantom Theater replaced Smurf's Enchanted Voyage (1984–1991), which was built in the same building. The attraction operated until mid-2002 and was overhauled in the offseason by Sally Corporation, reopening as Scooby-Doo and the Haunted Castle in 2003. Following the removal of Hanna-Barbera themes from the park, it was redesigned again, opening as Boo Blasters on Boo Hill in 2010. In both later versions, the original Omnimover ride system was reused.

A successor to Phantom Theater opened as Phantom Theater: Opening Nightmare in 2026. The redesign and construction was handled by Sally Corporation.

== History ==
Taft Broadcasting, interested in finding a way to promote its recently acquired Hanna-Barbera division, purchased Cincinnati's Coney Island in 1969 with the intent of expanding and moving the park. Construction of Kings Island began in 1970, and the most expensive attraction erected for the park's inaugural year was a dark ride called Enchanted Voyage, which cost approximately $2 million to construct. The ride was manufactured by Arrow Development and opened with the park in 1972.

=== The Enchanted Voyage (1972–1983) ===
Enchanted Voyage was located in a building shaped like a giant TV set, taking guests through several rooms featuring animatronic versions of new and old Hanna-Barbera characters. Its theme song, "Cartoon Friends", was composed by well-known Hanna-Barbera music producer Paul De Korte, and the lyrics were written by William Hanna and former Coney Island executive Dennis Speigel. It played throughout the ride, reciting themes from familiar characters such as Fred Flintstone, Scooby-Doo, and Yogi Bear. Less common shows such as Wacky Races and The Banana Splits were also alluded to. The first room introduced the song while the second room changed to a western accent, the third utilized a Caribbean flavor and the fourth had a "spooky" theme. The fifth and final room reverted to the original music with a circus-like ambiance. The rides final exit was at the "mouth" of a giant clown as each boat would travel a few feet up an inclined lift hill before splashing down the drop into the water on the other side.

=== Smurf's Enchanted Voyage (1984–1991) ===
For the 1984 season, Kings Island updated the ride's theme to Hanna-Barbera's The Smurfs, and it was renamed Smurf's Enchanted Voyage. New animatronics were used for various characters and decorations, and the song playing throughout the ride was changed to coincide with the cartoon. Smurf's Enchanted Voyage consisted of several rooms, each themed to a different season of the year focusing on holidays such as Christmas and Halloween.

=== Phantom Theater (1992–2002) ===
At the end of the 1991 season, the building housing the attraction was gutted, and the water transportation system was removed. Installed in its place was an Omnimover-type dark ride created by D.H. Morgan Manufacturing, similar in style to The Haunted Mansion attractions at various Disney parks around the world. An Anaheim-based theming company, R&R Creative Amusement Designs, Inc., developed the concept of the ride including its sets, props, and music. R&R, in conjunction with AVG Technologies of Valencia, also designed and fabricated the animatronic characters. The original boat loading area used on previous versions of the ride was retained and converted into a queue area for a kiddie roller coaster named Scooby Zoom, which later became Great Pumpkin Coaster. A new entrance was constructed for Phantom Theater at the opposite corner of the building, and a small, unused section of the building was converted into a children's theater called the "Enchanted Theater".

Phantom Theater officially opened to the public on April 11, 1992. It was themed as a behind-the-scenes tour of an abandoned theater haunted by the ghosts of vaudevillian-era performers, staff, and theatergoers who frequented the venue long ago. The exterior of the building was stylized as a dilapidated and crumbling opera theater. The queue area was dimly lit with a pair of electrical chandeliers above. The ride featured 17 separate scenes, some of which utilized a Pepper's ghost trick – a famous and widely used dark ride trick – to display ghostly illusions. The guests were welcomed into the theater by the Phantom Maestro, who were then led on a tour by No Legs Larry through the Theaters dressing rooms, prop rooms, technical backstage areas, before viewing the Theater Production, when the guests were then told to escape, the ill fated guests were led to the boiler room and thrown into the hot coals.

==== Removal ====
Phantom Theater closed on July 14, 2002. Nearly all thematic elements were removed and replaced with new scenes created by Sally Dark Rides. 28 of the 55 ride vehicles were also removed, while the remaining were retrofitted with laser light guns that riders would use to point and shoot at various targets throughout the ride. The attraction reopened in 2003 as Scooby-Doo and the Haunted Castle. Due to a licensing concern, the ride was slightly altered in 2010 and renamed Boo Blasters on Boo Hill.

In the years following Phantom Theater's removal, leftover ride components were used as props during the park's fall event, known as FearFest through 2006 and Halloween Haunt beginning in 2007, including placements in the Paramount Action FX Theater queue, along the Coney Maul midway, outside the entrance, and on the International Street bandstand.

Ride vehicles, characters, and other items were occasionally displayed at various attractions and locations across the park; for example, working Phantom Theater animatronics were set outside the line for Dracula's Haunted Castle at Paramount Action FX Theater during FearFest 2004, and other props such as a sarcophagus and cannon were installed in Madame Fatale’s Cavern of Terror, with the furnace placed in Slaughterhouse.

== Ride experience ==
=== Queue ===
Guests walked under an archway displaying the ride's logo into a short outdoor queue area before entering what appeared to be a very run-down, dilapidated old theater building. The large velvet rope–lined lobby queue served as the main queue room for the attraction. In the lobby, two chandeliers hung from the ceiling and the walls were decorated with posters of the theater's headlining performers:

- Maestro, the theater organist
- Hilda Bovine, an opera singer
- Houdelini, a magician
- The Great Garbanzo, a daredevil
- Lionel Burymore, a Shakespearean actor
- Willard Warbler, a singer

Lightning flashed from behind the curtains of two windows accompanied by the sound of thunder. On a balcony between the two windows, the theater's ghostly organist, Maestro (voiced by Richard Doyle), played away on a pipe organ, sitting with his back turned to the guests. Between concertos, Maestro would turn around and address the guests below, sinisterly inviting guests to take a tour of the theater while taunting them. He would then return to his organ with a maniacal laugh.

Leaving the lobby, guests climbed a short staircase into a long hallway lined with marble busts on both sides. Through the use of a hollow-face illusion, the busts would appear to turn their heads and stare at guests as they passed by to enter the loading station. In the loading station, guests would walk across a moving platform to board black, 3-passenger ride vehicles.

=== Ride ===
The ride cars departed the station and made a left turn, first facing Maestro, who was seen pulling back a curtain leading backstage and taunting the riders once more. Passing under the curtain, riders faced a row of portraits of the theater performers. Using a scrim effect, the portraits would disappear when lit from behind, revealing the ghostly versions of each performer. Down the hall, No Legs Larry, a legless ghost usher, floated in front of riders and directed them toward the performers' dressing rooms. The doors of each room swung open to show the performers preparing for the show. The final dressing room in the hallway belonged to the Mighty Bosco, a strongman, whose door was stuck and he was shown struggling to open it.

Entering the next scene, the cars faced an electrician who flipped a switch on a lighting board, causing the lights in the room to flicker on and off. He waved a flashlight on riders, telling them to move along. The next room displayed a pair of stagehands, with one pulling on a rigging rope, while the other was tangled up by his feet hanging upside-down and moving with each pull. Entering the rehearsal rooms, riders turned toward Houdelini, who pulled a demonic rabbit out of his top hat that roared at riders as they passed by. In the next room, Hilda Bovine sang a high note, which caused a mirror on the right side of the room to shatter.

Larry reappeared to guide riders to the auditorium where the show was about to begin. In the auditorium, riders viewed a large Pepper's ghost display of the performers doing their respective acts. Maestro played music on an organ in the orchestra pit, Houdelini levitated high above the stage, Hilda Bovine sang on top of a castle tower, and the Great Garbanzo launched himself out of a cannon across the room, crashing into a wall. Upon leaving the auditorium, Maestro appeared and forbade riders to leave the theater. Riders then entered the prop room where they were welcomed by a talking gargoyle. The cars passed by many bizarre sights such as an Egyptian sarcophagus, which opened to reveal a wailing mummy inside and blasting riders with cool air. Other sights included a giant mouse that popped up from behind a stack of crates in front of a terrified cat, as well as a Roman centurion statue that used a projected face as it spoke to riders.

The riders were then taken into the theater's boiler room, where they came face-to-face with a coal-burning furnace. One of the two boilermen opened the doors of the furnace, and riders were blasted with hot air as they passed by. The cars then returned to the loading station where riders exited the vehicles. As guests walked out of the building, Maestro could be heard one last time telling riders that despite escaping the theater, they would be back.

== Phantom Theater Encore ==
In celebration of the park's 50th anniversary in 2022, Kings Island introduced a new live stage show based on Phantom Theater called Phantom Theater Encore, which played at Kings Island Theater. The show debuted on June 4, 2022, and combined elements such as musical numbers, acrobatics, and puppetry. There was also an exhibit in the lobby displaying props from the attraction, concept art from R&R Creative, and a scale model of the ride's layout.

== Phantom Theater: Opening Nightmare (2026) ==
On August 28, 2025, Kings Island announced Phantom Theater: Opening Nightmare, a spiritual successor to the original 1992 attraction. Scheduled to debut in spring 2026, the ride is designed by Sally Dark Rides as both a homage to Phantom Theater’s characters and themes and a modernization with new technology and storyline. Boo Blasters on Boo Hill, which had operated in the same building since 2010, closed on September 1, 2025 to make way for the project.

The storyline centers on Maestro preparing for a performance when a lightning strike scatters enchanted "ghost notes" from his organ. Guests ride in opera box–themed vehicles and use "spellbound flashlights" to recapture the notes so the show can begin. According to park materials, the attraction features 26 interactive scenes with multi-sensory effects and Easter eggs referencing the original ride.
