= Children's attractions at Canada's Wonderland =

Children's areas at Canada's Wonderland

Coordinates: 43°50′33.16″N 79°32′31.00″W

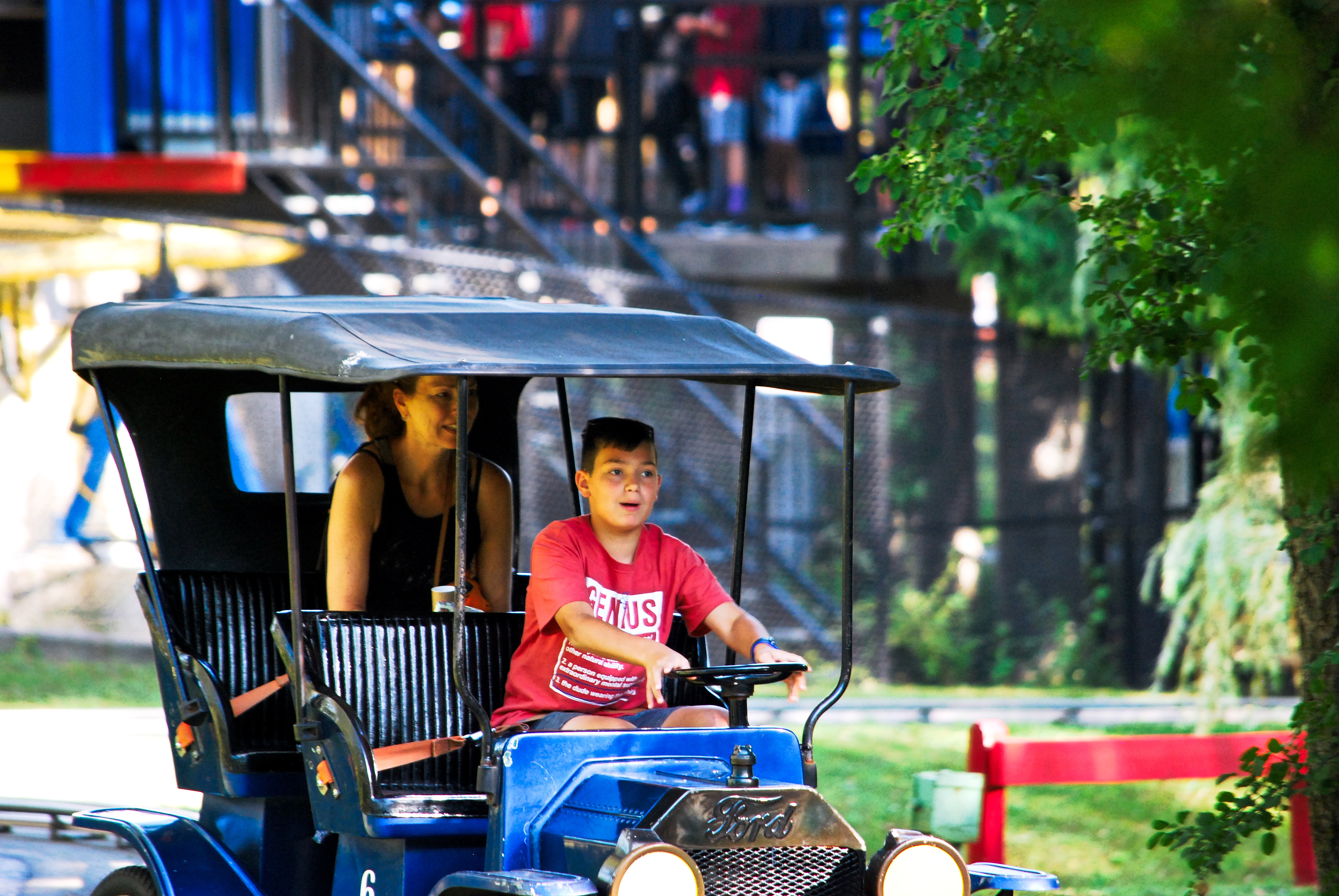
Boy driving vehicle at Jokey's Jalopies

There have been several children's areas at Canada's Wonderland since opening in 1981.

== Hanna-Barbera Land ==
Hanna-Barbera Land is the original children's area in the park which opened with the park. Initially called "Happyland of Hanna-Barbera" cartoon characters such as Yogi Bear and Fred Flintstone provided the theme for children's rides. When the section opened in 1981 it had three sections. The first section was "Yogi's Woods", based on The Yogi Bear Show. "Scoobyville" was the central town site, where a carousel and other attractions were included. On the opposite end of Scoobyville from Yogi's Wood was "Bedrock", based on The Flintstones.

Yogi's Woods was replaced in 1984 (see Kidzville), and Bedrock was replaced in 2003 (see Nickelodeon Central). Due to Cedar Fair's take over the park, many of the Hanna-Barbera references are expected to be removed in the near future. Until the end of the 2009 season, Hanna-Barbera Land has Aerofield, a ride with WWI style plans, Ghoster Coaster, Hanna-Barberry-Go-Round Carrousel, Scooby-Doo's Haunted Mansion, Jetson's Rocketport, Revolving Cages, and Swan Lake.

Canada's Wonderland is the last of the parks to have a Hanna-Barbera Land. "Happyland of Hanna-Barbera" was found at the sister Paramount Parks of Carowinds, Kings Dominion (replaced by Kidzville in 1997), and Kings Island (upper part renamed to Nickelodeon Central in 2001, and both sections renamed Nickelodeon Universe in 2006). In addition, the other sister Taft Broadcasting park of Australia's Wonderland, had a Hanna-Barbera Land, which was largely based on the layout of the Canada's Wonderland, until the park's closure in 2002.

Hanna-Barbera Land closed down following the end of the 2009 operating season, and has been replaced by Planet Snoopy in 2010.

== KidZville ==
In 1984, "Smurf Village" replaced Yogi's Woods; a themed area of Hanna-Barbera Land. The section featured the newly popular Hanna-Barbera cartoon The Smurfs and was a walk-through attraction. For the 1993 season, the Smurf Village section became "Kids' Kingdom." The year 1998 saw the Kidzville (styled as KidZville) area replace Kids' Kingdom. While the two Kids' Kingdom rides were kept, Kidzville also introduced Taxi Jam, Sugar Shack, Treetop Adventure, Flying Scooters and Swing Time (which removed Snail Trail). Today, it also has the rides, Frequent Flyers, Jokey's Jalopies and Kidzville Station.

A fourth themed area is Zoom Zone. Quite small, it is part of Kidzville. Created in 2001 with the debut of Silver Streak, it also contains the small rides of Blast Off and Jumpin' Jet. One of the Kidzville rides, and originally a Kids Kingdom ride, Jumbo Bumps, was removed to make way for these three rides and new section. Starting in 2004, the Zoom Zone was no longer printed on the park maps as an independent section, however since Cedar Fair's takeover each of the three rides mentions it is in Zoom Zone and park signage continues to indicate the name.

For operational purposes, Kidzville, Nickelodeon Central, and Hanna-Barbera Land are all considered to be one operational area, known internally by staff members as "H.B.", for Hanna-Barbera.

Sister Paramount Parks of Kings Dominion, and California's Great America both used to have a KidZville. Both created KidZville by replacing Hanna-Barbera themed areas. Kings Dominion replaced their Hanna-Barbera Land in 1997, and Great America replaced their "Smurf Woods" themed area in 1999.

When Planet Snoopy opened at the park in 2010, KidzVille remained unchanged, being the only former Paramount Park to retain the KidzVille name and theme following its transition to Cedar Fair.

== Nickelodeon Central ==
Nickelodeon Central is another children's section of the park carved out of part of Hanna-Barbera Land in 2003. It replaced "Bedrock", a Flintstones-themed area of Hanna-Barbera Land. Only the bumper cars were kept, turned into the Rugrats Toonpike. The Barney's Burgers restaurant was de-themed, and turned into a Pizza Pizza. The rides and area have a Nickelodeon theme. It also includes the rides Wild Thornberries Tree Top Lookout, Jimmy Neutron's Brainwasher, Dora's Dune Buggies. The area also had various signage of Nickelodeon characters from a specific show on them, with one side featuring a random quote on it.

The first ride accident in the park's history was August 23, 2003, when the Jimmy Neutron Brainwasher fell apart. Three children were sent to hospital as a precautionary measure.

A Nickelodeon Central section is also found at the other Cedar Fair theme parks of Carowinds (in 2003), Kings Dominion (in 2000), Kings Island (in 2001 and then expanded to Nickelodeon Universe in 2006), and California's Great America (in 2003). It is also found at the Australia theme park of Dreamworld, where through an alliance with Nickelodeon, they created a Nickelodeon Central in 2002 based on a similar concept on the Paramount Parks theme parks. As with most things "Nickelodeon", the word is often shorted to "Nick" and hence the area is often called "Nick Central". Nickelodeon Central is unrelated to the Nickelodeon Universe at the Mall of America in Minnesota.

Cedar Fair Entertainment Company acquired Paramount Parks from Viacom in 2006, for $1.24 Billion. In an August 2007 article with FunWorld, the International Association of Amusement Parks and Attractions (IAAPA) magazine, they said that they were excited about the Nickelodeon and Hanna-Barbera licenses, pointing out that the model for their children's areas was Kings Island's Nickelodeon Universe.

Nickelodeon Central was closed down following the end of the 2009 operating season, and was replaced by Planet Snoopy in 2010.

== Planet Snoopy ==
Planet Snoopy opened in 2010 as a replacement for Hanna-Barbera land. As of 2026, the rides 'Snoopy vs Red Baron' and 'Snoopy's Space Race' are available to all, while 'Snoopy's Revolution' and 'Snoopy's Racing Railway' require a supervising companion.
