= Sally Corporation =

Dark ride and animatronic manufacturing company

- Formerly: Sally Unlimited (1977-1982) Sally Industries (1983-1991) Sally Corporation (1992-2019)
- Industry: Manufacturing
- Founded: 1977
- Founder: John Wood; John Fox; John Rob Holland
- Headquarters: Jacksonville, Florida, U.S.
- Area served: Worldwide
- Key people: Rolf Paegert (CEO) John Wood (Chairman, President) Rich Hill (Chief Creative Officer)
- Products: Dark rides, animatronics
- Number of employees: 35
- Website: www.sallydarkrides.com

Sally Corporation (also known as Sally Dark Rides) is a dark ride and animatronic manufacturing company based in Jacksonville, Florida, United States. The company serves amusement parks, attractions, museums, and retail clients worldwide. It offers complete design/build services from concept to installation, including scripting, audio and music production, props and sets, lighting and special effects, electronics, and project management.

== History ==
Sally Corporation was founded in 1977 by high school friends John Fox and John Rob Holland. The company began by manufacturing animatronics for various commercial applications, including an animated figure of President Lyndon Baines Johnson, which was created for Neiman Marcus and later donated to the LBJ Library in Austin, Texas. After Sally had been in business for 6–9 months the second hire for the new company was John Wood who had previously worked with Fox. The first hire was an office manager, Nancy Hafner. John Fox left the company in 1983. Holland stayed with the company until 1988. In the late 1980s and early 1990s, Sally Corporation went on to develop interactive dark rides. John Wood continues to serve as the Chairman and President, with Rolf Paegert assuming the role of CEO following a corporate restructuring in January 2023.

== Dark Rides ==
Name	Park	Location	Type	Opened	Status	Notes	Ref.
Around the World in 80 Days	Alton Towers	Alton, Staffordshire, England	Redeveloped Dark Ride	1986	Defunct	Refurbishment	
Boo Blasters on Boo Hill	Canada's Wonderland; Carowinds; Kings Dominion; Kings Island	Vaughan, Ontario, Canada; Charlotte, North Carolina, United States; Doswell, Virginia, United States; Mason, Ohio, United States	Interactive Dark Ride	2010	Operating	Cedar Fair retheme of Scooby-Doo's Haunted Mansion; Variant of the Ghost Blasters II Model.	
Challenge of Tutankhamon	Walibi Belgium	Wavre, Walloon Brabant, Belgium	Interactive Dark Ride		Operating		
Den of Lost Thieves	Indiana Beach; Seoul Land	Indiana, United States; South Korea	Interactive Dark Ride		Operating		
E.T. Adventure	Universal Studios Florida; Universal Studios Hollywood	Orlando, Florida, United States; Universal City, California, United States	Conventional Dark Ride	1990 (Orlando); 1991 (Hollywood)	Operating at Orlando Removed at Hollywood	Animatronic Figures & Plants Only.	
El Ultimo Minuto	Dinopolis	Teruel, Spain	Conventional Dark Ride		Operating		
Ghost Blasters (Ghost Hunt)	Castle Park; Great Canadian Midway Lake Compounce; Nickelodeon Universe; Santa Cruz Beach Boardwalk	Riverside, California, United States; Clifton Hill, Ontario, Canada Bristol, Connecticut, United States; Minneapolis, Minnesota, United States; Santa Cruz, California, United States	Interactive Dark Ride	2001 (Castle Park & Santa Cruz); 2002 (Great Canadian Midway); 1999 (Lake Compounce & Nickelodeon Universe)	Operating		
Ghost Blasters II	Elitch Gardens Theme Park	Denver, Colorado, United States	Interactive Dark Ride	2008	Defunct	Rethemed to Kaleidoscape by Meow Wolf in 2019.	
Gobbler Getaway	Holiday World & Splashin' Safari	Santa Claus, Indiana, United States	Interactive Dark Ride	2006	Operating		
The Great Humbug Adventure	Santa's Village	Jefferson, New Hampshire, United States	Interactive, Redeveloped Dark Ride	2000 (Original); 2020 (Refurbishment)	Operating	Redesigned by Sally for the 2020 Season.	
The Great Pistolero Roundup (Quick Draw)	Family Kingdom Amusement Park; Frontier City Korean Folk Village	Myrtle Beach, South Carolina, United States; Oklahoma City, Oklahoma, United States South Korea	Interactive Dark Ride	1995 (Family Kingdom); 2007 (Frontier City)	Operating		
Haunted Castle	Santa Cruz Beach Boardwalk; Galaxyland	Santa Cruz, California, United States; Edmonton, Alberta, Canada	Custom Dark Ride		Operating		
Haunted Hotel	Myrtle Beach Pavilion	Myrtle Beach, South Carolina, United States	Redeveloped Dark Ride		Defunct		
Jocco's Mardi Gras Madness	Six Flags New Orleans	New Orleans, Louisiana, United States	Interactive Dark Ride		Defunct		(Note: Destroyed by Hurricane Katrina in 2005.)
Justice League: Alien Invasion 3D	Warner Bros. Movie World	Gold Coast, Queensland, Australia	Interactive Dark Ride		Operating		
Justice League: Battle for Metropolis	Six Flags Over Texas; Six Flags St. Louis; Six Flags Great America; Six Flags Mexico Six Flags Magic Mountain; Six Flags Great Adventure; Six Flags Over Georgia	Arlington, Texas, United States; Eureka, Missouri, United States; Gurnee, Illinois, United States; Mexico City, Mexico; Valencia, California, United States; Jackson, New Jersey, United States; Austell, Georgia, United States	Interactive Dark Ride	2015	Operating		
Kong X Godzilla: The Ride	Lotte World Adventure	Korea	Dark Ride	2026	Upcoming		
La Aventura de Scooby-Doo	Parque Warner Madrid	Spain	Interactive Dark Ride	2005	Operating	Spanish Variant of Scooby-Doo's Haunted Mansion.	
Labyrinth of the Minotaur	Terra Mítica	Benidorm, Alicante province, Spain	Interactive Dark Ride		Operating		
Laser Raiders	Legoland Windsor	Windsor, Berkshire, England	Interactive Dark Ride		Operating		
Lost Kingdom Adventure	Legoland California; Legoland Florida; Legoland Malaysia	Carlsbad, California, United States; Winter Haven, Florida, United States; Nusajaya, Johor, Malaysia	Interactive Dark Ride		Operating		
Mine of Lost Souls	Canobie Lake Park	Salem, New Hampshire, United States	Redeveloped Dark Ride		Operating		
Mystic Mansion Spökjakten	Park at OWA Furuviksparken	Foley, Alabama, United States Furuvik, Sweden	Interactive Dark Ride	2019 (OWA); 2018 (Furuvik)	Operating	Variant of the Ghost Blasters II Model.	
Nights in White Satin: The Trip	Freestyle Music Park	Myrtle Beach, South Carolina, United States	Conventional Dark Ride	2008	Defunct		
North Pole Adventure	Happy Valley; Happy Valley; Happy Valley	Chengdu, China; Shenzhen, China; Shanghai, China	Interactive Dark Ride	1997; 2007	Operating		
Reese's Cupfusion	Hersheypark	Derry Township, Pennsylvania, United States	Interactive Dark Ride	2019	Operating		
Reese's Xtreme Cup Challenge	Hersheypark	Derry Township, Pennsylvania, United States	Interactive Dark Ride	2006	Defunct		
Scooby-Doo's Haunted Mansion	Canada's Wonderland; Carowinds; Kings Dominion; Kings Island	Vaughan, Ontario, Canada; Charlotte, North Carolina, United States; Doswell, Virginia, United States; Mason, Ohio, United States	Interactive Dark Ride	2000 (Canada's Wonderland); 2001 (Carowinds); 2004 (Kings Dominion); 2003 (Kings Island)	Defunct		
Scream In The Dark!	Ripley's Entertainment Zone	Pattaya, Thailand	Interactive Dark Ride		Operating		
Sesame Street: Street Mission	PortAventura Park	Catalonia, Spain	Interactive Dark Ride	2019	Operating		
SpongeBob's Crazy Carnival Ride	Circus Circus Las Vegas	Winchester, Nevada, United States	Interactive Dark Ride	2023	Operating		
The Temple	Legoland Billund	Billund, Denmark	Interactive Dark Ride		Operating		
Treasure Hunt: The Ride	Cannery Row	Monterey, California, United States	Interactive Dark Ride	2023	Operating		
Volkanu: Quest for the Golden Idol	Lost Island Theme Park	(United States) Waterloo, Iowa	Interactive Dark Ride	2022	Operating		
Vi På Saltkråkan	Astrid Lindgren's World	Vimmerby, Sweden	Conventional Dark Ride	2007	Operating		
*Ye Old Mill	Playland	Rye, New York, United States	Redeveloped Dark Ride	2001	Operating	Refurbishment	
Yosemite Sam and the Gold River Adventure!	Six Flags Over Texas	Arlington, Texas, United States	Redeveloped Dark Ride	1992	Defunct		
Zombie Paradise	Tokyo Dome	Bunkyo, Tokyo, Japan	Conventional Dark Ride	1992	Defunct		

== Animatronic Shows ==
Name	Premiered	Theme	Known Installations	Current Venues	Status	Characters	Notes
Daniel and the Dixie Diggers	1982	Dixieland Jazz	Adventureland (Iowa); Aqualandia; Celebration Station; Choo Choo Charlie's Ontario; Dixie Dog Showtime Phenix City; Fairplay Family Fun Center Wabash; Family Kingdom; Funtime, USA Garden City; Hersheypark (as Dogpatch Dawgs); Huckleberry Junction Genesee; Kidz Zone Greenville; Squirty Worm Lima; Mark Twain's Riverboat Playhouse (Kendall & Fort Lauderdale); Paddlewheel Hotel & Casino; Paddlewheel Pizza Parlor Groton; Pinocchio's Pizza Bountiful; Pizza Pizzazz Whitehall; Roller Kingdom Reno; Roll On America Lancaster; Rusutsu Resort; Skateland Salisbury; Station Alpha Pikeville	Celebration Station (Clearwater and Mesquite locations only, standing but not operating); Huckleberry Junction Genesee; Roller Kingdom Reno (Standing But Not Operating); Rusutsu Resort	Operating	Betty B. Birthday; Clem; Col. Beauregard; Daniel T. Bones; Huck L. Berry; Jethro P. Hogg; Mark Twain; Scratchmo; Sir Percival; Wally Wish	Available in Quintet, Trio, and "Mark Twain's Showboat" Variants.
Hank & Beau	1982	Country, Bluegrass, Dixieland Jazz	Bryant's Supermarket Greenville; Funhouse Pizza Salem; Formosa Wonderland; Gregerson's Supermarket Gadsden; Pip's Ice Cream Parlor; Sam's Joint Caledonia; Stew Leonard's (Norwalk & Danbury); Sunny Hill Resort Greenville	Stew Leonard's (Norwalk & Yonkers); Sunny Hill Resort Greenville	Operating	Col. Beauregard; Hank Winter	Can be separable for solo acts.
Sally at the Piano	1983	Piano Lounge	Holiday Inn Dallas; Rusutsu Resort; Wax World of the Stars Wisconsin Dells; Westgate New York Grand Central	Rusutsu Resort	Operating	Sally; Papa Bear (Rusutsu Only)	Namesake of the company.
Gwen and the Magical Music Makers	1983	Medieval, Musical	Enchanted Castle (Calgary & Lombard); Round Table Pizza	N/A	Defunct	King Arthur; Godfrey; Guinevere; Lance; Merlin; Oscar Owl; Prince; Rodney; Toby	Partial Mark Twain's Showboat (Daniel and the Dixie Diggers) Retrofit.
John Phillip Tuba	1983	Marching Band	John Phillip Tuba's Ice Cream in the Park	N/A	Privately Owned	John Philip Tuba; Pablo Pistachio	
The Berenstain Bears	1985	Unknown	International Association of Amusement Parks and Attractions	N/A	Defunct	Brother Bear; Papa Bear	Papa Bear figure repurposed for Rusutsu's Sally at the Piano.
The Magic Lantern Theater	1985	Steampunk, Vaudeville	Six Flags Power Plant	N/A	Defunct	Mr. Electro; Proto	Co-production with Landmark Entertainment Group.
*The WizBangs	1985	Magic, Fantasy	Mystery Fun House	N/A	Defunct	Craven; Morgana; Prince; Wizard; Wizzy	Chuck E. Cheese Cyberamics Retrofit; *Equipment & Programming Only.
*Ratón Chito y Sus Amigos	1985-86	Unknown	ShowBiz Pizza Fiesta; Boomis Pizza Fiesta	N/A	Defunct	Comecome; Elote; Ratón Chito; Tete; Venancio	Chuck E. Cheese Cyberamics Retrofit; Show Controllers Only.
Bubba and the Badland Band	1987	Country, Bluegrass (English) Folk Music (Korean)	Dutch Wonderland; Everland / Yongin Farmland; Fun Mountain Gatlinburg; Rusutsu Resort	Rusutsu Resort	Operating	Bubba Bear; Bucky Barnum; Chief Fullabull; Miss Foxy; Homer Honeydew; Mark Twain; Skeeter	Available with or without Mark Twain.
Billy Jo and the Bluegrass Boys	1987-89 (Prototype) 1994-95 (Redesign)	Country, Bluegrass	Frontier City; ShowBiz Pizza Kuwait	N/A	Defunct	Billy Jo; Bubba Bear; Homer Honeydew	Redesigned in 1995.
Care Bears: Care-A-Lot Castle	1987	Care Bears, Fantasy	Dunia Fantasi; Dorney Park & Wildwater Kingdom	N/A	Defunct	Beastly; Bedtime Bear; Cheer Bear; Friend Bear; Funshine Bear; Grumpy Bear; No-Heart; Tenderheart Bear	
Jethro P. Hogg	1988	Country, Bluegrass	Aldor Acres Langley; Casino Pier; Celebration Station; Cross Eyed Critters Nashville; Farmland Foods (as Jasper P. Swineherd); Funtime, USA Garden City; Huckleberry Junction Genesee; MoonDoggie Beach Club (as Moonhoggie); Porky's BBQ Lafayette; Ruggieri's Market Cranston; Santa's Workshop (as Elmer Elf)	Aldor Acres Langley; Cross Eyed Critters Nashville; Huckleberry Junction Genesee; Porky's BBQ Lafayette; Santa's Workshop (as Elmer Elf)	Operating	Jethro P. Hogg	Can be paired with the Trio Daniel and the Dixie Diggers.
Ursula and the Oom-Pah-Pahs	1989	Alpenländische Volksmusik	Rusutsu Resort	Rusutsu Resort	Operating	Berthold of Baden; Ludwig Von Bearhoven; Sigmund St. Gotthard; Ursula; Wilhem von Wickenstat	Exclusive to Rusutsu Resort.
Banda Chic Chic	1993	Unknown	Chico Cheese's Rio de Janeiro	N/A	Defunct	Bucky Barnum; Col. Beauregard; Miss Foxy	Exclusive to Chico Cheese's.
Chu-Lin and the Zoo Notes	1993	Zoo	Madrid Zoo Aquarium	N/A	Defunct	Chu-Lin Panda; Gigi Giraffe; Hector Hippo; Mombo Monkey; Tumbo Elephant	Exclusive to Madrid Zoo Aquarium.
The Rockin' Rascals	1993	Rock and Roll	Celebration Station Knoxville	N/A	Defunct	Calvin Cat; Hurricane Hound; Major Moose; Purrscilla Purr	Daniel and the Dixie Diggers Trio Retrofit.
The Jammin' Jesters	1994	Medieval, Rock and Roll, Broadway	Enchanted Castle Lombard	Enchanted Castle Lombard	Undergoing Refurbishment	Cute; Godfrey; Guinevere; Rodney (Unnamed); Toby; Wally Wizard	Reconfigured Gwen and the Magical Music Makers.
YeYe and the Little Airplane Band	1994	Chinese folklore	Splendid China Florida	N/A	Defunct	The Monkey King; Pun Pun Hippo; Show Gow Giraffe; Shou Shou Panda; Ting-Ting Panda; YeYe Panda	Exclusive to Splendid China Florida; Monkey King exists in private ownership.
*Rocky and the Railroad Ramblers (The Man & Dog)	1992* (Installed) 1995* (Operational)	Country, Bluegrass	Gillian's Wonderland Pier; The Promenade Food Court	N/A	In Storage	Antonio "Tony" Vermicelli; Bubba Bonga; Henrietta Hatpin; Henry "Hank" Howls; Rocky Panda	Chuck E. Cheese Cyberamics Retrofit; *Equipment & Soundtrack Only.
The Flintstones Bedrock Trio	1996	Stone Age, Rock and Roll	Bedrock City South Dakota	N/A	Defunct	Dino; Fred Flintstone; Wilma Flintstone	Destroyed upon Bedrock City's closure.
*Rocky and the Ramblin' Rascals	1998	Country, Bluegrass	Enchanted Forest Water Safari	Enchanted Forest Water Safari	Operating	Antonio "Tony" Vermicelli; Bad Bonga; Henrietta Hatpin; Jumpin' Jacko; Rocky Rabbit	Chuck E. Cheese Cyberamics Retrofit; *Equipment & Soundtrack Only.
*Okefenokee Bear Revue	2000	Country, Rock and Roll	Okefenokee Swamp Park	N/A	Privately Owned	Billy Bob Brockali; Clem (Looney Bird); Peaches (Mitzi Mozzarella); Whitmer (Fatz Geronimo)	Rock-afire Explosion Retrofit; *Equipment & Programming Only.
Cross Eyed Critters	2020	Country, Rock	Graduate Nashville	Graduate Nashville	Operating	Miss Bessie; Ernie Bear; Jethro P. Hogg	Miss Foxy and Bubba Bear retrofits from Bubba and The Badland Band are used. Cooper Manning provides the voice for Ernie.
