= Ghost Blasters =

Dark ride attraction franchise

Castle Park
- Status: Removed
- Opening date: 2001
- Closing date: 2026

Elitch Gardens
- Status: Removed
- Opening date: 2008
- Closing date: 2018
- Replaced by: Meow Wolf's Kaleidoscape

Lake Compounce
- Status: Operating
- Opening date: 1999

The Great Canadian Midway
- Status: Operating
- Opening date: 2002

Nickelodeon Universe
- Status: Operating
- Opening date: 1999

Santa Cruz Beach Boardwalk
- Status: Operating
- Opening date: 2001

Ride statistics
- Attraction type: Dark ride
- Manufacturer: Sally Corporation
- Designer: Rich Hill, Senior Designer for Sally Corporation
- Theme: Haunted attraction

Ghost Blasters is an interactive dark ride franchise, designed and created by Sally Corporation. The franchise includes many locations at various amusement parks throughout the United States and Canada. Riders on "Ghost Blasters" are equipped with laser guns, as the attraction travels through a themed "haunted manor". The goal of the attraction is to accumulate a high score by aiming and firing at lit targets.

Years after Cedar Fair acquired Paramount Parks, the Scooby-Doo themed dark rides from Kings Island, Carowinds, Kings Dominion and Canada's Wonderland were modified and renamed Boo Blasters on Boo Hill, as this ride is made by the same company and is nearly identical to the original Ghost Blasters. The experience for these rides are based on the refurbished Ghost Blasters II at Elitch Gardens with the gunfire sound effect being borrowed from the original Ghost Blasters.

== Ride premise ==
"Bleakstone Manor, is overrun with ghosts led by one named Boocifer (a portmanteau of "boo" and "Lucifer"), and this seems to be bringing property values down in the area. The area residents have hired Professor Phearstruck, who has invented a boo-blaster, which sends ghosts out of the house when they are shot with it. Guests are to do their best at eliminating Boocifer's ghosts as they travel through the mansion in the boo-blaster vehicles."

== Locations ==
=== Ghost Blasters ===
- Castle Park in Riverside, California (2001)
- Elitch Gardens in Denver, Colorado (2008):

The attraction at Elitch Gardens in Denver Colorado, received a major refurbishment and renovation in 2008, and was renamed Ghost Blasters II. It closed in 2018 and was re-themed by Meow Wolf into an attraction named Kaleidoscape for the 2019 season.

- Lake Compounce in Bristol, Connecticut (1999):

At Lake Compounce amusement park in Connecticut, the attraction is named Ghost Hunt, and received a major refurbishment in 2008, which incorporated a new trackless ride system. This is the first and only version of this attraction to utilize a trackless system.

- The Great Canadian Midway, at Clifton Hill in Niagara Falls, Ontario, Canada (2002):

Ghost Blasters at the Great Canadian Midway was later renamed Ghost Blasters 3D after utilizing 3D glasses on the attraction.

- Nickelodeon Universe at Mall of America in Bloomington, Minnesota (1999)
- Santa Cruz Beach Boardwalk in Santa Cruz, California (2001)

=== Boo Blasters on Boo Hill ===
- Canada's Wonderland in Vaughan, Ontario, Canada (2010)
- Carowinds in Charlotte, North Carolina (2010)
- Kings Dominion in Doswell, Virginia (2010)
- Kings Island in Mason, Ohio (2010–2025)

=== Mystic Mansion ===
- The Park at OWA in Foley, Alabama (2019)

=== Spökjakten ===
- Furuviksparken in Furuvik, Sweden (2018)
