= Lego Pharaoh's Quest =

Lego theme

- Subject: Egypt Exploration
- Availability: 2011–2012
- Total sets: 9
- Characters: Jake Raines; Mac McCloud; Professor Hale; Helena Skvalling
- Official website

Lego Pharaoh's Quest is a discontinued Lego theme that was first introduced in 2011. It uses elements from the previous Lego Adventurers theme. The Lego Pharaoh's Quest theme was discontinued by the end of 2012.

== Overview ==
The product line focuses on an archaeologist Professor Archibald Hale who is on the trail of Amset-Ra, a long lost Pharaoh, and his six mysterious treasures.

== Characters ==
Minifigures for the Pharaoh's Quest are broken up into two groups, humans, who serve as the heroes, and the creatures who serve the Pharaoh. There are also six treasures that referenced as being the items that the humans seek to stop the Pharaoh from gaining the power to take over the world.

=== Adventurers ===
- Jake Raines: He is a famous ace pilot and adventure hero. The hero of the storyline.
- Mac McCloud: The team's expert mechanic, driver and demolitions specialist.
- Professor Archibald Hale: The scholarly Professor Archibald Q. Hale discovered the legend of Amset-Ra and set him on the quest to find the six lost treasures.
- Helena Skvalling: She speaks 7 languages and is an expert at deciphering maps.

=== Pharaoh foe ===
- Pharaoh Amset-Ra: Ruled ancient Egypt thousands of years ago and hoarded his riches. Sought immortality and great power, but was sealed away when 5 of the 6 treasures that would grant him power to take over the world were stolen.
- Mummy Warrior: Serve their master, the Pharaoh and travel in packs.
- Flying Mummies: More dangerous, but rarer, they soar through the sky on magical wings of Horus.
- Anubis Guard: Elite warriors of the Pharaoh that wear masks of the jackal headed Anubis. Their wrappings have been enchanted to make them almost as strong and tough as stone. They protect the Scorpion Pyramid.
- Giant Scarab: The scarab has been in hibernation for thousands of years waiting for an adventurer to try to dig up the golden stone.
- Stone Cobra: The stone cobra looks like mere sandstone carving but with the Pharaoh's command it will come to life and defend the Golden scarab shield.
- Sphinx: This statue is no myth it will magically come to life and defend the golden sword from all attackers.
- Giant Scorpion: This stone statue turned to stone to protect the sixth treasure from invaders and adventurers.

== Launch ==
The Lego Pharaoh's Quest theme was launched at the American International Toy Fair in 2011. As part of the initial launch, The Lego Group released six Pharaoh's Quest Lego sets.

== Construction sets ==
According to BrickLink, The Lego Group released 9 playsets and promotional polybags as part of the Lego Pharaoh's Quest theme. The product line was eventually discontinued by the end of 2012.

The first release included six sets. The largest of the six sets was "Scorpion Pyramid" which included 792 pieces and seven minifigures. In addition to the first release of sets two polybag sets were released in 2011 as newspaper promotions in the United Kingdom and Ireland and a battle pack which included three minifigures and a sarcophagus was released around the same time as the main sets.

Lego have also released accompanying products branded under the Pharaoh's Quest theme. These include a Coin Bank which included 166 Lego elements, a three piece magnet set consisting of the Jake Raines, Amset-Ra, and Anubis Guard minifigures each attached to a magnetized brick, and three key chains with the key chain attached to the same minifigures featured in the magnet sets.

== Theme park attractions ==
In 2002, Kingdom of the Pharaohs was introduced to Legoland Deutschland Resort featuring Temple X-pedition, Pyramid Rallye, Desert X-cursion and Holiday Village Entrance/Exit

In 2008, Kingdom of the Pharaohs was introduced to Legoland Windsor Resort featuring Laser Raiders.

== See also ==
- Lego Adventurers
- Lego Indiana Jones
