= Lego Adventurers =

Lego theme

- Sub‑themes: Egypt; Jungle; Dino Island; Orient Expedition
- Subject: Adventurers and explorers
- Availability: 1998–2003
- Total sets: 87
- Characters: Johnny Thunder; Dr. Kilroy; Pippin Reed; Sam Sinister

Lego Adventurers is a discontinued Lego theme based on an early 20th century 'explorer' concept. It centred upon the main character named Johnny Thunder and a team of explorers who go on adventures. Unlike other Lego themes, which take place in a fictional "Lego Universe", most of the Adventurers sets took places in real-world locations, such as Egypt, the Amazon rainforest, the Himalayas, India, and China. The only fictional sub-theme took place on an island where prehistoric creatures still lived. The theme was first introduced in 1998. The product line was discontinued in 2003 and replaced with the Lego Pharaoh's Quest theme in 2011.

== Overview ==
The product line centered around early 20th century exploration and involved the characters exploring new areas and going on adventures. It focused on a character named Johnny Thunder. It began in 1998 with a desert theme, which involved the character searching for the pharaoh's ruby in Egypt. The Adventurers toy sets were the first to include sand-coloured parts. Johnny Thunder was accompanied by several other characters, including Miss Pippin Reed, Dr. Kilroy, and a daredevil pilot named Harry Cane. These characters were pursued by the evil villains Slyboots and Baron Von Barron. In 1999, the theme moved from the Egyptian desert to the Amazonian jungle. The storyline involved a race to obtain a sun disc from a mystical figure named Achu. The antagonists were changed to Senor Palomar and Rudo Villano. These Adventurers jungle toy sets were the first to include a Lego blimp (set number: 5956).

In 2000, Johnny Thunder reappeared in a product line named Dino Island. The pilot character Harry Cane was replaced by a dinosaur expert named Mike. The evil character Baron Von Barron, now renamed "Sam Sinister", reappeared alongside his new cohorts Mr. Cunningham and Alexia Sinister. The storyline centered around the villains attempting to capture dinosaurs from an island. In 2003, Johnny Thunder returned in a product line named Orient Expedition, which centered on a journey across Asia. The storyline involved the team travelling to various countries in search of Marco Polo's treasure, the Golden Dragon.

== Characters ==
=== Adventurers ===
- Johnny Thunder: The leading man in the Lego Adventurers line. He is Australian and is a daring, compassionate archaeologist. He sports a khaki shirt with a red bandanna, black legs, and a bush hat. He was formerly known as "Sam Grant" in the UK and "Joe Freemann" in Germany.
- Dr. Kilroy: One of Johnny Thunder's companions on his epic adventures. He is a professor and is Johnny's uncle, but like a father figure to him. He sports a pith helmet, a white shirt with a red bow-tie, and green legs. He was formerly known as "Dr. Charles Lightning" in North America and "Professor Articus" in Germany, as well as "Professor Titus" during the Dino Island subtheme.
- Pippin Reed: The female companion of Johnny Thunder who is a budding journalist, recording all of the adventures. She sports a green jacket, red legs, and either a pith helmet or pilot helmet. She was formerly known as "Gail Storm" in North America and "Linda Lovely" in Germany.
- Harry Cane: A companion of Johnny Thunder who is an experienced pilot. He wears a pilot helmet with a brown leather jacket and black legs. He was formerly known as "Billy Speed" in Germany.
- Mike: A young friend of Johnny Thunder who wants to adopt a baby T. rex.
- Babloo: He is a young Indian boy trying to find the sunstone and save his village from the evil Maharaja Lallu.
- Sangye Dorje: He is a sherpa with a lot of experience in the mountains.
- Jing Lee: She is a Chinese freedom fighter who helps Johnny Thunder find the Golden Dragon.

=== Villains ===
- Mr. Hates: The main villain in the Adventurers line, he seeks to take things he considers valuable, including trapping dinosaurs. He has a scarred face and sports a monocle, khaki shirt with holster, grey legs, epaulettes, and either a pith helmet, top hat, or pilot helmet. His left hand is a hook. He was formerly known as "Evil Eye" in the UK and "Baron von Barron" in North America. He was later renamed "Lord Sam Sinister", which caused some confusion with the character of Sam Sinister (who largely disappeared from the Adventurers canon after the name change); during the Dino Island theme, he was also known as "Sam Sanister" in various countries.
- Slyboots: The cohort of Mr. Hates; various publications differed on whether he was the boss or the henchman. One of the main villains, he dresses entirely in black and is a representation of the archetypal "villain". He wears glasses. He was formerly known as "Sam Sinister" in North America and "Lizard Boots" in the UK.
- Señor Palomar: The main antagonist of the Amazon Jungle theme, who is seeking the Sun Disc for an unknown art collector. He was also known as "Señor Gomez" in the UK.
- Rudo Villano: Señor Palomar's superstitious jungle guide. The name is composed of the Spanish words rudo (mean) and villano (villain). He was also known as "Max Villano" in the UK.
- Alexia Sinister: The sister of Lord Sam Sinister, who helps him come up with his plans. She was also known as "Alexis Sanister" in various countries, with other sources combining the two spellings of her name.
- Mr. Cunningham: A tough master of disguise working for Lord Sam Sinister. He is somewhat overweight.
- Maharaja Lallu: The maharaja is a ruthless tyrant who plans on using the sunstone to take over Babloo's village.
- Ngan Pa: He is a greedy and ruthless yeti hunter. He is happy to help Lord Sinister for a share of the treasure hidden in the mountains.
- Emperor Chang Wu: He is a cruel and oppressive Chinese mandarin. He seized control of the city of Xi'an and rules it with an iron fist and a large force of bodyguards. He is known as "the false emperor" by those over whom he rules, such as Jing Lee. He is another of Lord Sinister's partners in crime.

=== Other characters ===
- Pharaoh Hotep: The mummy who keeps the Re-Gou ruby and curses tomb robbers with bad jokes. He was also known as "Pharaoh Ramses" in Germany.
- Gabarro: A sailor who works for both the adventurers and the villain Señor Palomar. In more recent publications, his name is written as "Gabarros".
- Achu: A mysterious man in tribal clothing who guards the Sun Disc.

== Construction sets ==
According to BrickLink, The Lego Group released 87 playsets and promotional polybags as part of the Lego Adventurers theme. The product line was eventually discontinued by the end of 2003.

=== Egypt ===
The first sub-theme starts off with Johnny and company in the deserts of Egypt. The main goal for Johnny is to explore the ancient Egypt structures, and find the "Re-Gou ruby" before any of his enemies obtain it first. 25 sets and promotional polybags was released from 1998 to 1999.

- Johnny Thunder (set number: 1094) was released on 1998. The set consists of 13 pieces with 1 minifigure. The set included Lego minifigure of Johnny Thunder.
- Adventurers Raft (set number: 1182) was released on 1998. The set consists of 18 pieces with 1 minifigure. The set included Lego minifigure of Johnny Thunder.
- Mummy and Cart (set number: 1183) was released on 1998. The set consists of 17 pieces with 1 minifigure. The set included Lego minifigure of Pharaoh Hotep.
- Adventurers Car (set number: 2541) was released on 1998. The set consists of 24 pieces with 1 minifigure. The set included Lego minifigure of Baron von Barron.
- Adventurers Aeroplane (set number: 2542) was released on 1998. The set consists of 21 pieces with 1 minifigure. The set included Lego minifigure of Harry Cane.
- Desert Expedition (set number: 2879) was released on 1998. The set consists of 196 pieces with 4 minifigures. The set included Lego minifigures of Baron von Barron, Dr. Charles Lightning, Harry Cane and Sam Sinister.
- Adventurers Car (set number: 2995) was released on 1998. The set consists of 70 pieces with 1 minifigure. The set included Lego minifigure of Dr. Charles Lightning.
- Adventurers Tomb (set number: 2996) was released on 1998. The set consists of 70 pieces with 2 minifigures. The set included Lego minifigures of Pharaoh Hotep and Sam Sinister.
- Adventurers Plane (set number: 3022) was released on 1998. The set consists of 23 pieces with 1 minifigure. The set included Lego minifigure of Harry Cane.
- Treasure Tomb (set number: 3722) was released on 1998. The set consists of 164 pieces with 2 minifigures. The set included Lego minifigures of Baron von Barron and Johnny Thunder.
- Scorpion Tracker (set number: 5918) was released on 1998. The set consists of 35 pieces with 1 minifigure. The set included Lego minifigure of Johnny Thunder.
- Bi-Wing Baron (set number: 5928) was released on 1998. The set consists of 70 pieces with 1 minifigure. The set included Lego minifigure of Baron von Barron.
- Oasis Ambush (set number: 5938) was released on 1998. The set consists of 77 pieces with 2 minifigures. The set included Lego minifigures of Johnny Thunder and Sam Sinister.
- Mummy's Tomb (set number: 5958) was released on 1998. The set consists of 260 pieces with 4 minifigures. The set included Lego minifigures of Dr. Charles Lightning, Johnny Thunder, Pharaoh Hotep and Sam Sinister.
- Sphinx Secret Surprise (set number: 5978) was released on 1998. The set consists of 347 pieces with 6 minifigures. The set included Lego minifigures of Baron von Barron, Dr. Charles Lightning, Gail Storm, Johnny Thunder, Pharaoh Hotep and Sam Sinister.
- The Temple of Anubis (set number: 5988) was released on 1998. The set consists of 711 pieces with 7 minifigures. The set included Lego minifigures of Baron von Barron, Dr. Charles Lightning, Gail Storm, Harry Cane, Johnny Thunder, Pharaoh Hotep and Sam Sinister.

=== Jungle ===
The crew must search deep into the Amazon Jungle in order to discover the ancient ruins where the powerful "Sun Disc" lies. But they first have to get past their new enemies and the tribal chief "Achu". 10 sets and promotional polybags was released in 1999.

- Jungle Surprise (set number: 1271) was released on 1999. The set consists of 33 pieces with 1 minifigures. The set included Lego minifigure of Gail Storm.
- River Raft (set number: 5901) was released on 1999. The set consists of 19 pieces with 1 minifigures. The set included Lego minifigure of Rudo Villano.
- Ruler of the Jungle (set number: 5906) was released on 1999. The set consists of 24 pieces with 1 minifigures. The set included Lego minifigure of Achu.
- Pontoon Plane (set number: 5925) was released on 1999. The set consists of 72 pieces with 1 minifigure. The set included Lego minifigure of Harry Cane.
- Spider's Secret (set number: 5936) was released on 1999. The set consists of 128 pieces with 2 minifigures. The set included Lego minifigures of Gail Storm and Señor Palomar.
- Expedition Balloon (set number: 5956) was released on 1999. The set consists of 175 pieces with 4 minifigures. The set included Lego minifigures of Dr. Charles Lightning, Harry Cane, Johnny Thunder and Rudo Villano.
- River Expedition (set number: 5976) was released on 1999. The set consists of 318 pieces with 6 minifigures. The set included Lego minifigures of Achu, Dr. Charles Lightning, Gabarro, Johnny Thunder, Rudo Villano and Señor Palomar.
- Amazon Ancient Ruins (set number: 5986) was released on 1999. The set consists of 458 pieces with 6 minifigures. The set included Lego minifigures of Achu, Dr. Charles Lightning, Gabarro, Gail Storm, Johnny Thunder and Señor Palomar.

=== Dino Island ===
The explorers discover a new mysterious island. In search of new adventure, the crew discovers that there are dinosaurs living on the island. They realize what fame they could have with this new discovery so they start researching the prehistoric animals. Unfortunately, Johnny's old enemies come along to capture and steal the dinosaurs from him. 17 sets and promotional polybags was released in 2000.

- Johnny Thunder and Baby T (set number: 1278) was released on 2000. The set consists of 23 pieces with 1 minifigure. The set included Lego minifigure of Johnny Thunder.
- Cunningham's Dinofinder (set number: 1279) was released on 2000. The set consists of 21 pieces with 1 minifigure. The set included Lego minifigure of Mr. Cunningham.
- Microcopter (set number: 1280) was released on 2000. The set consists of 28 pieces with 1 minifigure. The set included Lego minifigure of Dr. Charles Lightning.
- Mike's Dinohunter (set number: 1281) was released on 2000. The set consists of 24 pieces with 1 minifigure. The set included Lego minifigure of Mike.
- Johnny Thunder's Plane (set number: 5911) was released on 2000. The set consists of 22 pieces with 1 minifigure. The set included Lego minifigure of Johnny Thunder.
- Mike's Swamp Boat (set number: 5912) was released on 2000. The set consists of 19 pieces with 1 minifigure. The set included Lego minifigure of Mike.
- Dr. Kilroy's Car (set number: 5913) was released on 2000. The set consists of 21 pieces with 1 minifigure. The set included Lego minifigure of Dr. Charles Lightning.
- Sam Sanister and Baby T (set number: 5914) was released on 2000. The set consists of 21 pieces with 1 minifigure. The set included Lego minifigure of Baron von Barron.
- Island Racer (set number: 5920) was released on 2000. The set consists of 50 pieces with 1 minifigure. The set included Lego minifigure of Baron von Barron.
- Research Glider (set number: 5921) was released on 2000. The set consists of 57 pieces with 1 minifigure. The set included Lego minifigure of Mike.
- Dino Explorer (set number: 5934) was released on 2000. The set consists of 90 pieces with 2 minifigures. The set included Lego minifigures of Dr. Charles Lightning and Johnny Thunder.
- Island Hopper (set number: 5935) was released on 2000. The set consists of 205 pieces with 1 minifigure. The set included Lego minifigure of Gail Storm.
- All Terrain Trapper (set number: 5955) was released on 2000. The set consists of 185 pieces with 3 minifigures. The set included Lego minifigures of Alexia Sinister, Baron von Barron and Mr. Cunningham.
- T-Rex Transport (set number: 5975) was released on 2000. The set consists of 321 pieces with 5 minifigures. The set included Lego minifigures of Alexia Sinister, Baron von Barron, Dr. Charles Lightning, Johnny Thunder and Mike.
- Dino Research Compound (set number: 5987) was released on 2000. The set consists of 617 pieces with 6 minifigures. The set included Lego minifigures of Baron von Barron, Dr. Charles Lightning, Gail Storm, Johnny Thunder, Mike and Mr. Cunningham.

=== Orient Expedition ===
The adventurers travel east to find the "Golden Dragon of Marco Polo" in China. Along the way, the crew comes across many new allies, enemies, and artifacts in the Himalayas and India. 20 sets and promotional polybags was released in 2003.

- Johnny Thunder (set number: 3380) was released on 2003. The set consists of 6 pieces with 1 minifigure. The set included Lego minifigure of Johnny Thunder.
- Sam Sinister (set number: 3381) was released on 2003. The set consists of 5 pieces with 1 minifigure. The set included Lego minifigure of Lord Sam Sinister.
- China Girl (set number: 3382) was released on 2003. The set consists of 4 pieces with 1 minifigure. The set included Lego minifigure of Jing Lee.
- Secret of the Tomb (set number: 7409) was released on 2003. The set consists of 42 pieces with 1 minifigure. The set included Lego minifigure of Lord Sam Sinister.
- Jungle River (set number: 7410) was released on 2003. The set consists of 64 pieces with 1 minifigure. The set included Lego minifigure of Johnny Thunder.
- Tygurah's Roar (set number: 7411) was released on 2003. The set consists of 87 pieces with 1 minifigure. The set included Lego minifigure of Dr. Kilroy.
- Yeti's Hideout (set number: 7412) was released on 2003. The set consists of 107 pieces with 1 minifigure. The set included Lego minifigure of Pippin Reed.
- Passage of Jun-Chi China (set number: 7413) was released on 2003. The set consists of 94 pieces with 1 minifigure. The set included Lego minifigure of Johnny Thunder.
- Elephant Caravan (set number: 7414) was released on 2003. The set consists of 86 pieces with 3 minifigures. The set included Lego minifigures of Babloo, Pippin Reed, and Lord Sam Sinister.
- Aero Nomad (set number: 7415) was released on 2003. The set consists of 120 pieces with 2 minifigures. The set included Lego minifigures of Dr. Kilroy and Johnny Thunder.
- Emperor's Ship (set number: 7416) was released on 2003. The set consists of 177 pieces with 3 minifigures. The set included Lego minifigures of 2 Emperor Guards and Lord Sam Sinister.
- Temple of Mount Everest (set number: 7417) was released on 2003. The set consists of 292 pieces with 4 minifigures. The set included Lego minifigures of Johnny Thunder, Ngan Pa, Lord Sam Sinister and Sangye Dorje.
- Scorpion Palace (set number: 7418) was released on 2003. The set consists of 341 pieces with 5 minifigures. The set included Lego minifigures of Dr. Kilroy, Johnny Thunder, Maharaja Lallu, Lord Sam Sinister, Palace Guard.
- Dragon Fortress (set number: 7419) was released on 2003. The set consists of 732 pieces with 9 minifigures. The set included Lego minifigures of Dr. Kilroy, Dragon Fortress Guardian, Emperor Chang Wu, 2 Emperor Guards, Pippin Reed, Jing Lee, Johnny Thunder and Lord Sam Sinister.
- Thunder Blazer (set number: 7420) was released on 2003. The set consists of 69 pieces with 1 minifigure. The set included Lego minifigure of Johnny Thunder.
- Red Eagle (set number: 7422) was released on 2003. 33 pieces with 1 minifigure. The set included Lego minifigure of Johnny Thunder.
- Mountain Sleigh (set number: 7423) was released on 2003. The set consists of 30 pieces with 1 minifigure. The set included Lego minifigure of Dr. Kilroy.
- Black Cruiser (set number: 7424) was released on 2003. 28 pieces with 1 minifigure. The set included Lego minifigure of Lord Sam Sinister.

== Video games ==
Lego Adventurers make several crossovers into the video games such as cameo and playable characters.

=== Lego Island 2: The Brickster's Revenge ===
Lego Island 2: The Brickster's Revenge was a 2001 action-adventure video game developed by Silicon Dreams Studio and published by Lego Software. The video game's plot includes a segment where the player character Pepper Roni goes to Adventurers' Island, a location modeled after the Lego Adventurers theme and featuring characters including Johnny Thunder, Dr. Kilroy, Miss Pippin Read, Mr. Hates, and Achu.

=== Lego Racers ===
Lego Racers was a Lego-themed racing video game developed by High Voltage Software and published by Lego Media. Set in the fictional "Legoland" universe, the single-player mode follows various minifigure characters competing in a racing competition created by a fictional racing champion called Rocket Racer. In this video game, three racetracks are based upon the Lego Adventurers theme. Johnny Thunder and Baron von Barron are bosses while Pharaoh Hotep, Achu, Sam Sinister, and Gail Storm appear as additional racers.

=== Lego Racers 2 ===
Lego Racers 2 was a Lego-themed racing video game developed by Attention to Detail, published by Lego Software and distributed in North America by Electronic Arts. It was first released in September 2001 for Microsoft Windows, PlayStation 2 and Game Boy Advance. It is the sequel to the 1999 game Lego Racers. The Lego Adventurers characters and setting return in the Dino Island stage of Lego Racers 2, reflecting the then-ongoing sets.

=== Lego Universe ===
Lego Universe was a massively multiplayer online game that was available from October 2010 to January 2012. The game was developed by NetDevil and released on October 26, 2010. Johnny Thunder makes an appearance in Lego Universe as a non-playable character.

=== Lego Stunt Rally ===
Lego Stunt Rally was a Lego-themed racing video game for Microsoft Windows and Game Boy Color. Developed by Intelligent Games for PC and Graphic State for Game Boy Color and published by Lego Media, the game features a track editor that allows players to build single-player and multiplayer tracks. The Lego Adventurers characters make a guest appearance in the game's intro cutscene.

=== Football Mania ===
Football Mania (known as Soccer Mania in North America) was a Lego-themed sports game released in 2002 for the PlayStation 2, Microsoft Windows and Game Boy Advance. The Lego Adventurers characters can be found on various teams in Lego Football Mania, and several levels take place on fields inspired by Lego Adventurers sets.

=== Lego Legacy: Heroes Unboxed ===
Lego Legacy: Heroes Unboxed (2020) was developed by Gameloft. Lego Legacy: Heroes Unboxed was released exclusively for Microsoft Windows, Android and iOS devices on 27 February 2020. Johnny Thunder makes an appearance in the game.

== Theme park attractions ==
In 2002, Jungle X-pedition was introduced to Legoland Deutschland Resort. The attraction featuring a log ride for guests of all ages ending in a 12-meter drop over a waterfall.

In 2008, Land of Adventure was launched at Legoland California in March 2008. The attraction was designed to replicate the 1920s in Egypt, drawing inspiration from the Lego Adventurers line (Egypt sub-theme). Also in this area is Beetle Bounce, Cargo Ace, Dune Raiders, Lost Kingdom Adventure and Pharaoh's Revenge.

In 2009, Laser Raiders was launched to Legoland Windsor Resort in March 2009. The attraction featuring an interactive dark ride through an Egyptian tomb where visitors shoot targets to gain points. Also in this area is Scarab Bouncers, Aero Nomad, Desert Chase and Thunder Blazer. The latter three rides are fairground based attractions such as a carousel and a Ferris wheel ride. It was later launched in 2011 at Legoland Florida and in September 2012 at Legoland Malaysia Resort. The attraction (It was also known as The Temple) also was launched in 2019 at Legoland Billund Resort.

== Other media ==
=== The Lego Movie ===
The theme's main character Johnny Thunder made an appearance in the 2014 film The Lego Movie and The Lego Movie Videogame.

=== Lego Minifigures ===
Lego Minifigures Series 19 (set number: 71025) was released on 1 September 2019 worldwide. The "Jungle Explorer" minifigure is a direct reference to Johnny Thunder and the Lego Adventurers theme. It also included a magnifying glass and backpack, and marks the first appearance of the new Lego chameleon piece..

== Legacy ==
Stig Hjarvard remarked on the similarity of Johnny Thunder and the dinosaur hunting theme to Jurassic Park and opined that the Johnny Thunder series, amongst other unlicensed Lego product lines, "may be considered to be the forerunners of the subsequent licensing of a variety of media stories and characters."

== See also ==
- Lego Pharaoh's Quest
- Lego Studios
- Lego Dino
- Lego Indiana Jones
- Lego Minifigures (theme)
- The Lego Movie (Lego theme)
- LEGO Jurassic World
