= Lego Indiana Jones =

Lego theme

- Sub‑themes: Raiders of the Lost Ark; The Temple of Doom; The Last Crusade; The Kingdom of the Crystal Skull
- Subject: Indiana Jones
- Licensed from: Lucasfilm (The Walt Disney Company)
- Availability: 2008–2009, 2023
- Total sets: 22
- Official website

Lego Indiana Jones is a Lego theme based on the Indiana Jones film franchise created by George Lucas, licensed from Lucasfilm. The exclusive franchise (for the 'Construction Category Rights') was first announced in June 2007, and followed the successful Lego Star Wars franchise, also with Lucasfilm. The first set of products were launched in 2008, based upon two of the three earlier films (Raiders of the Lost Ark and The Last Crusade). Sets featuring scenes from the fourth film, Indiana Jones and the Kingdom of the Crystal Skull, were released alongside the film, later in 2008. The Temple of Doom film was not featured until 2009, in a large set which re-created the mine-cart chase using new narrow-gauge Lego train track.

The theme also features in a video game series. Lego Indiana Jones: The Original Adventures was released on June 3, 2008, based on the original trilogy. A sequel, called Lego Indiana Jones 2: The Adventure Continues, was released in November 2009, including scenes from the new Kingdom of the Crystal Skull film, along with a level editor feature.

The theme was relaunched in 2023 with three sets based on Raiders of the Lost Ark and The Last Crusade. It was discontinued at the end of 2024.

== Overview ==
Lego Indiana Jones is based on the Indiana Jones film franchise. The product line focuses on Indiana Jones (Ford), a globe-trotting archaeologist, vying with Nazi forces in 1936, to recover the long-lost Ark of the Covenant, a relic said to make an army invincible. Teaming up with his tough former lover Marion Ravenwood (Allen), Jones races to stop rival archaeologist Dr. René Belloq (Freeman) from guiding the Nazis to the Ark and its power.

== Development ==
The development of the Indiana Jones Lego theme followed a similar process to other Lego themes, with sets being designed by Lego's team of designers in Billund, in consultation with franchise owner Lucasfilm. The inclusion of guns within the sets (including machine guns) was a cause of some internal controversy.

== Characters ==
- Indiana Jones: An archaeology professor and adventurer.
- Marion Ravenwood: A spirited, tough bar owner and Jones' former lover.
- René Belloq: A rival archaeologist to Jones, in the employ of the Nazis.
- Willie Scott: An American nightclub singer working in Shanghai. In a nod to the Star Wars franchise, the nightclub is called Club Obi Wan. Willie is unprepared for her adventure with Indy and Short Round, and appears to be a damsel in distress. She also forms a romantic relationship with Indy.
- Mola Ram: A Thuggee priest who performs rites of human sacrifices. The character is named after a 17th-century Indian painter.
- Short Round: Indy's 11-year-old Chinese sidekick, who drives the 1936 Auburn Boat Tail Speedster which allows Indy to escape during the opening sequence.
- Henry Jones, Sr.: Indiana's father, a professor of Medieval literature who cared more about looking for the Grail than raising his son.
- Elsa Schneider: An Austrian art professor who is in league with the Nazis. She seduces the Joneses to trick them but seems to be in love with Indy.
- Irina Spalko: A villainous Soviet agent.
- Mutt Williams: a young, motorcycle-riding greaser and Indiana's sidekick and son.

== Construction sets ==
According to BrickLink, The Lego Group released a total of 22 Lego sets and promotional polybags as part of Lego Indiana Jones theme. The product line was eventually discontinued by the end of 2009.

The initial wave of sets was released in 2008, Temple Escape (set number: 7623) was one of the biggest, and features the famous boulder chase scene from the opening sequence of Raiders of the Lost Ark. Measuring 53 cm long, the set included numerous 'booby traps' from the film, including shooting spears and tumbling rocks. As well as Indiana Jones himself, the set included minifigs of René Belloq and Satipo. Pilot Jock and his seaplane were also included as a late addition, with the Lego designer and Lucasfilm agreeing that they were an important addition to complete the scene (allowing Indy to escape).

Two other medium-size sets released at the same time also featured scenes from the Lost Ark film. The Lost Tomb (set number: 7621) depicted a snake-filled tomb, which Indy must escape from, and Race for the Stolen Treasure (set number: 7622) depicted the chase scene from the film, with Indy riding a horse in pursuit of a truck.

Later in 2008, four sets were released featuring scenes from the new film. The biggest of these was Kingdom of the Crystal Skull (7627), which focused on the final scene of the movie, and included a rotating circle of 'crystal skeletons', as well as the falling obelisk tower. The characters Mutt Williams, Irina Spalko and two Ugha Warriors were all included in minifig form, as well as Indy and an unnamed Russian soldier.

In 2009, the 'gap' of having no sets from The Temple of Doom was filled with two new sets featuring scenes from the film. The biggest of the two, The Temple of Doom (set number: 7199), included new narrower gauge (4-studs wide rather than the usual 6 studs) Lego train tracks in order to re-create the mine cart chase scene from the second half of the film. Six track piece were included in two shapes, four as curves and two as slopes. Straight track pieces for this new type of train track have not yet been released in any set.

The second-biggest set released in 2009 was Venice Canal Chase (set number: 7197), which depicts the boat chase scene from Indiana Jones and the Last Crusade. The set includes two boats, one driven by Indy and Elsa Schneider, and the other driven by two Grail Guardians. The boats appear largely identical bar a few colour differences, but contain different button-activated actions - one boats splits in two when a button is pressed, the other one features an 'exploding' motor. The two Grail Guardian minifigs are notable for their dark red Fez hats, which is a new Lego element. The set also features a Venetian style bridge and an exploding pier.

In March 2023, three sets were announced to be released on 1 April 2023. The three sets are Fighter Plane Chase (set number: 77012), Escape from the Lost Tomb (set number: 77013) and Temple of the Golden Idol (set number: 77015). A fourth set, The Temple of Doom (set number: 77014) has been cancelled.

== Products ==
Name	Number	Minifigures	Released	Film	Pieces
Motorcycle Chase	7620	Indiana Jones, Henry Jones, Sr., German Motorcyclist	2008	Indiana Jones and the Last Crusade	79
The Lost Tomb	7621	Indiana Jones, Marion Ravenwood, Skeleton	2008	Raiders of the Lost Ark	277
Race for the Stolen Treasure	7622	Indiana Jones, German Guards x2, Horse	2008	Raiders of the Lost Ark	272
Temple Escape	7623	Indiana Jones, Rene Belloq, Satipo, Jock, Skeleton x2	2008	Raiders of the Lost Ark	552
Jungle Duel	7624	Indiana Jones, Irina Spalko, Mutt Williams	2008	Indiana Jones and the Kingdom of the Crystal Skull	90
River Chase	7625	Indiana Jones, Russian Guards x2, Marion Ravenwood	2008	Indiana Jones and the Kingdom of the Crystal Skull	234
Jungle Cutter	7626	Indiana Jones, Colonel Dovchenko, Russian Guards x2	2008	Indiana Jones and the Kingdom of the Crystal Skull	511
Temple of the Crystal Skull	7627	Indiana Jones, Mutt Williams, Irina Spalko, Russian Guard, Ugha Warriors x2, Crystal Skull Skeletons x3, Conquistador Skeleton	2008	Indiana Jones and the Kingdom of the Crystal Skull	929
Peril in Peru	7628	Indiana Jones, Mutt Williams, Irina Spalko, Russian Guard, Pilot, Colonel Dovchenko	2008	Indiana Jones and the Kingdom of the Crystal Skull	625
Jungle Cruiser	20004	Indiana Jones (no bag)	2008	Indiana Jones and the Kingdom of the Crystal Skull	83
SDCC 08 Exclusive	comcon002	Ugha Warriors x2	2008	Indiana Jones and the Kingdom of the Crystal Skull	117
Shanghai Chase	7682	Indiana Jones (tuxedo), Willie Scott, Short Round, Lao Che, Kao Kan	2009	Indiana Jones and the Temple of Doom	244
Fight on the Flying Wing	7683	Indiana Jones, Marion Ravenwood, German Mechanic, German Pilot	2009	Raiders of the Lost Ark	376
Ambush in Cairo	7195	Indiana Jones (Cairo), Swordsman, Cairo Bandit, Marion Ravenwood	2009	Raiders of the Lost Ark	79
Chauchilla Cemetery Battle	7196	Indiana Jones (new face), Mutt Williams, Cemetery Warriors x2, Conquistador Skeleton	2009	Indiana Jones and the Kingdom of the Crystal Skull	189
Venice Canal Chase	7197	Indiana Jones (professor), Elsa Schneider, Kazim, Brotherhood of the Cruciform Sword guard	2009	Indiana Jones and the Last Crusade	420
Fighter Plane Attack	7198	Indiana Jones (no bag), Henry Jones Sr., German Pilot	2009	Indiana Jones and the Last Crusade	339
The Temple of Doom	7199	Indiana Jones (Kali), Willie Scott (Kali), Short Round, Thuggee, Chief Thugee, Mola Ram	2009	Indiana Jones and the Temple of Doom	654
Fighter Plane Chase	77012	Indiana Jones, Professor Henry Jones Sr, Fighter Pilot	2023	Indiana Jones and the Last Crusade	387
Escape from the Lost Tomb	77013	Indiana Jones, Marion Ravenwood, Sallah, Mummy	2023	Raiders of the Lost Ark	600
The Temple of Doom	77014	Indiana Jones, Willie Scott, Short Round, Mola Ram, The Maharajah, Thugee Guard	Cancelled	Indiana Jones and the Temple of Doom	801
Temple of the Golden Idol	77015	Indiana Jones, Satipo, Belloq, Hovitos Warrior	2023	Raiders of the Lost Ark	1545

== Video games ==
In common with some of the other movie franchise Lego themes, Lego Indiana Jones also features spin-off video games. These combine scenes from the films with the graphic style of the Lego pieces and minifigures.

=== Lego Indiana Jones: The Original Adventures (2008) ===
This was the first videogame released in the series, produced by Traveller's Tales and published by LucasArts in 2008. It features scenes from the first three Indiana Jones films, which can be played in any order.

=== Lego Indiana Jones 2: The Adventure Continues (2009) ===
This game was produced as a sequel to The Original Adventures, and includes scenes from the fourth film in the franchise (Kingdom of the Crystal Skull), as well as all-new scenes from the three original films. The game also added a new level editor.

=== Lego Indiana Jones 2: The Adventure Continues (handheld) ===
A separate version of the game, developed by TT Fusion and released for Nintendo DS and PSP, with different gameplay and story.

== Lego Indiana Jones and the Raiders of the Lost Brick ==
A computer-animated short film, Lego Indiana Jones and the Raiders of the Lost Brick, directed by Peder Pedersen, was also released on the official Lego site. It combines details from the first four Indiana Jones films in one adventure.

== Other media ==
=== Lego Ideas ===
A project based on Indiana Jones, Raiders of the Lost Ark – 40th Anniversary was uploaded to the Lego Ideas site on January 11, 2021, and it was created by Simon Scott reached 10,000 votes on LEGO Ideas in order for Lego to consider to make it into an official set. The project is based on Indiana Jones, Raiders of the Lost Ark – 40th Anniversary from the Raiders of the Lost Ark film.

== Reception ==
The Indiana Jones sets proved to be one of the most popular Lego themes, and by the end of 2008 were credited, along with Lego Star Wars, of boosting the Lego Group's profits within a stagnant toy market. The product line was said to have "sold extremely well - especially on the North American market." The sets were occasionally compared to those of the discontinued Lego Adventurers label (which was strongly influenced in its own right by the Indiana Jones franchise), which ran from 1998 to 2003.

== See also ==
- Lego Star Wars
- Lego Adventurers
- Lego Pharaoh's Quest
- Lego Studios
