= Legoland Florida =

Lego-themed resort in Winter Haven, Florida

Legoland Florida Resort
- Previously known as Cypress Gardens

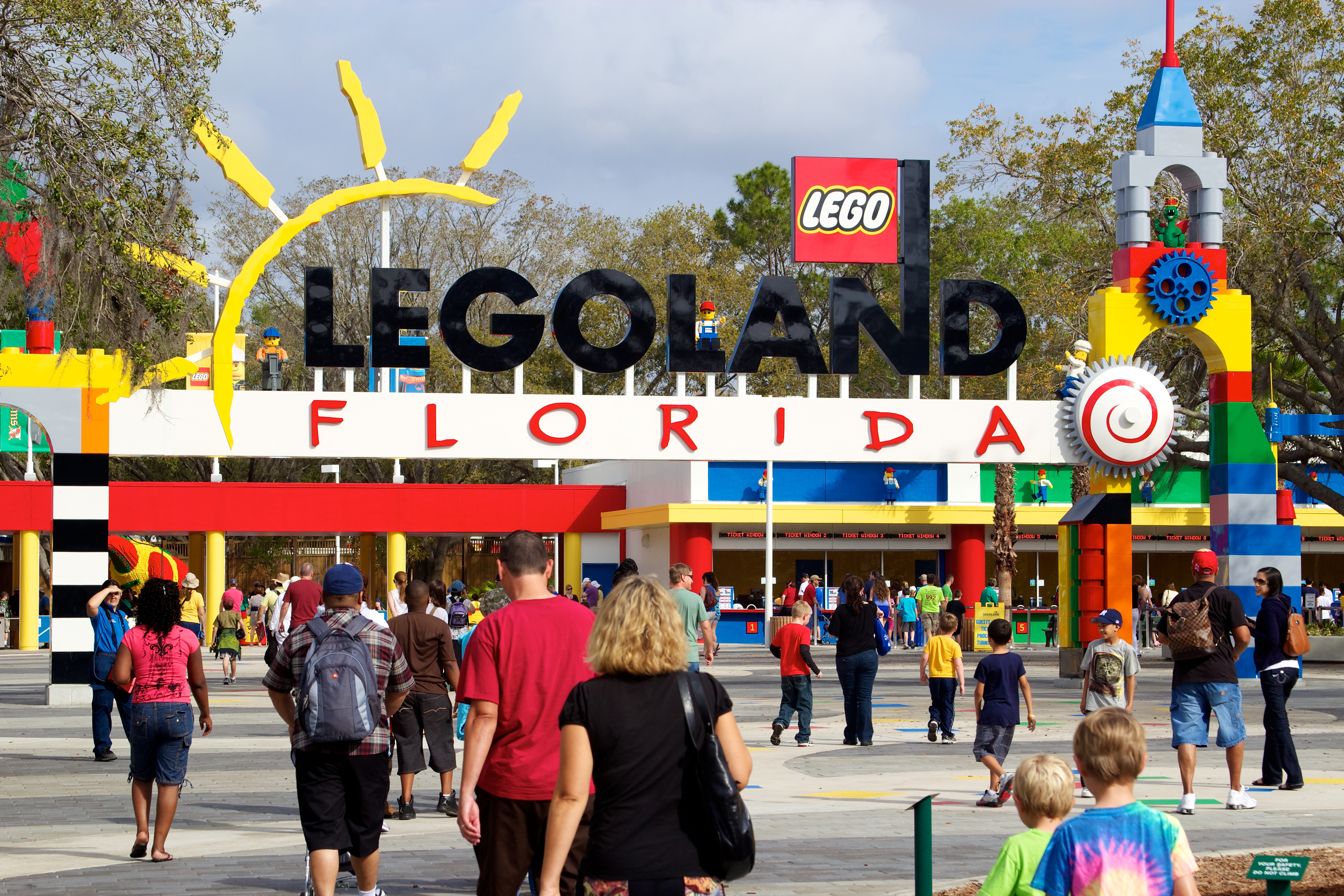
- Interactive map of Legoland Florida Resort
- Location: Winter Haven, Florida, United States
- Coordinates: 27°59′21.02″N 81°41′23.77″W
- Status: Operating
- Opened: October 15, 2011; 15 years ago
- Owner: Merlin Entertainments
- Operated by: Merlin Entertainments
- General manager: Brian Bacica
- Theme: Lego toys and childhood amusement
- Slogan: Built for Kids
- Operating season: Year-round
- Area: 145 acres (0.59 km^{2})

Attractions
- Total: 24 (as of 2026)
- Roller coasters: 4
- Water rides: 6
- Website: Official website

Legoland Florida Resort (stylized as LEGOLAND Florida Resort) is a family-friendly vacation destination in Winter Haven, Florida. The resort features the Legoland Florida theme park itself, the Legoland Water Park, three on-site accommodations and a separately-ticketed on-site park based on Hasbro's British children's animated series Peppa Pig that opened on February 24, 2022.

Built on the site of the former Cypress Gardens theme park, Legoland preserved the botanical gardens and re-themed the water park and select attractions and venues to reflect various Lego brands.

== History ==
On January 15, 2010, Merlin Entertainments declared its intention to build a Legoland theme park on the site of the former Cypress Gardens theme park, which permanently ceased operations in 2009. Six days later, a news conference was held with Florida Governor Charlie Crist and park officials. The story broke a day before the press conference after an email between public officials was obtained by a local newspaper; the sale price was $22.3 million.

After a relatively short construction period (as compared to parks which were built from scratch), Legoland Florida Resort opened on Saturday, October 15, 2011.

The park expanded by adding more lands such as The World of Chima (Jul 2013), Heartlake City (Jun 2015), and Lego Ninjago World (Jan 2017) as well as expanding itself as a resort. On November 21, 2013, Legoland Florida announced they would be adding their first onsite hotel, the Legoland Hotel. It opened to the public on May 15, 2015. A second resort, Legoland Beach Retreat, was announced March 15, 2016 as part of a major expansion effort and it opened on April 7, 2017, approximately 3/4 mile (1.2 km) east of the theme park, on the western shore of Lake Dexter. The most recent development was the announcement of the world's first theme park area themed with The Lego Movie, which opened on March 27, 2019.

From mid-March to May 2020, as with all Legoland parks, the park was shut down due to the COVID-19 pandemic.

== Attractions ==
=== Theme parks ===
==== Legoland Florida Resort ====
The Legoland Florida Resort opened on October 15, 2011, The park encompasses 145 acres (0.59 km^{2}), making it the second-largest Legoland park after Legoland Windsor in the UK.

Designed for families with children ages 2 to 12, the park has more than fifty rides, shows, attractions, restaurants, and shops, plus the original Cypress Gardens that pays homage to the park's former usage. Unlike other select Legoland attractions, children are not required for entry.

==== Peppa Pig Theme Park ====
On February 25, 2021, as part of the company's exclusive multi-territory licensing agreement with Hasbro and Entertainment One (Later Hasbro), Merlin Entertainments announced to build a 4.5 acres (1.8 ha) Peppa Pig theme park in the resort simply titled "Peppa Pig Theme Park" for 2022. It will be the first standalone theme park based on the children's property, as well as the second dry park and the first non-Lego related theme park to open in a Legoland Resort. Peppa Pig Theme Park Florida is separately ticketed from the Legoland Florida Resort in the resort, but bundled two-day, two-park tickets to visit both parks are available.

On August 13, 2021, the six main attractions for the park were announced.

On October 13, 2021, it was confirmed that the park would open on February 24, 2022, a year after its initial announcement.

==== Legoland Water Park ====
The Legoland Water Park was initially constructed as "Splash Island", which debuted in 2005 with five rides within Cypress Gardens. Splash Island was the only water park in Polk County when it opened. After Merlin Entertainments purchased the Cypress Gardens site, Splash Island was reworked with Lego themes replacing the original Polynesian-themed attractions. The Legoland Water Park also added a sixth attraction, a toddler water play area named Duplo Splash Safari, which featured slides and fountains in a shallow pool. The park reopened under its new name on May 26, 2012.

Admission to the Water Park requires purchase of an admission ticket to the theme park. The initial extra cost for admission to the water park was $12 for ages 4 and up, aimed at visitors spending a second day at Legoland.

Sea Life Florida Aquarium

It is the newest resort attraction officially opened to the public on June 26th 2025. The Aquarium features a number of exhibits focused on marine education and interactive experiences. It has about 3000 marine animals and 150 species. An experience of a 180 degree tunnel is also available for visitors to walk through and watch aquatic creatures underwater.

The admission fee to Sea Life costs a ticket price starting from $25 per person for one day. The combo ticket which allows you to enter the Legoland attractions and Sea Life can start from $89 per person.

Galacticoaster (Indoor roller coaster)

Recently Legoland Florida Resort announced the Galacticoaster, which is a new indoor galaxy themed experience planned to open on February 27, 2026. It is the first indoor roller coaster built in the main theme park since 2011. The indoor coaster will have technologically advanced features and an immersive experience simulating a Lego spacecraft flying into space.

== Accommodation ==
=== Legoland Hotel Florida ===
The 152-room Legoland Hotel Florida opened May 15, 2015.

=== Legoland Beach Retreat ===
The Legoland Beach Retreat opened on April 7, 2017, which has 166 rooms in 83 freestanding bungalows designed to resemble giant Lego sets.

=== Pirate Island Hotel ===
Pirate Island Hotel opened on June 25, 2020, after a previous delay from April 17 due to COVID-19. This hotel is themed to pirates.

== Resort layout and attractions ==
=== Legoland Florida Resort ===
Themed areas and key locations within Legoland Florida Resort

More than fifty rides, shows, and attractions are featured in the park based on those at other Legoland parks. The Jungle Coaster ride from Legoland Windsor Resort was moved to the park and renamed Lego Technic Test Track (now The Great Lego Race).

Cypress Gardens' botanical park was preserved as part of the park. Also surviving is a vast Banyan tree that was planted as a seedling in a five-gallon bucket in 1939. In addition, four attractions originally from Cypress Gardens were renovated and renamed: the Triple Hurricane wooden rollercoaster was renamed to Coastersaurus, the Okeechobee Rampage family coaster was renamed to The Dragon, and Swamp Thing, a Vekoma family inverted coaster, was renamed Flying School. The Starliner coaster, formerly built for the Miracle Strip Amusement Park in Panama City in 1963 before being moved to Cypress Gardens in 2004, was dismantled for sale. The Island in the Sky observation tower was also retained and operated from 2011 until it was closed in 2017.

The Legoland Florida theme park has fourteen sections:

==== The Beginning ====
The Beginning features no attractions, but it contains the park's main gift shops, restaurants, and administrative facilities. The Legoland Hotel is located just outside the park's entrance.

==== Fun Town ====
Attraction	Added	Image	Description
Grand Carousel	Oct 15, 2011		A double-decker carousel. It originally opened with standard horses, but it was refurbished in February 2012 and the original horses were replaced with Lego horses.
Wells Fargo Fun Town Theater	Oct 15, 2011 (Theatre)		A 4D cinema with seven hundred seats. The theater is sponsored by Wells Fargo.

4D film titles
Started	Title	Current
Oct 15, 2011	Lego Racers 4D	Yes
Oct 15, 2011	Spellbreaker 4D	Yes
Oct 15, 2011	Lego City: A Cluch Powers 4D Adventure	Yes
Jul 3, 2013	Lego Chima 4D Movie Experience	Yes
Jan 29, 2016	The Lego Movie: 4D – A New Adventure	Yes
May 26, 2016	Lego Nexo Knights: The Book of Creativity	Yes
Jan 20, 2018	Lego Ninjago: Masters of the 4th Dimension	Yes
Jan 24, 2019	Lego City 4D: Officer in Pursuit	Yes
May 27, 2021	Lego Mythica 4D: Journey to Mythica	Yes
Aug 1, 2023	Lego DREAMZzz 4D: Z-Blob Rescue Rush	Yes

==== Heartlake City ====
Attraction	Added	Image	Description
Mia's Riding Adventure	June 26, 2015		A Disk-O flat ride manufactured by Zamperla which has guests strapped into a horse and spin on a disc alongside a track. The Park had a Zamperla Disc'O from under previous management from 2004 to 2008
Heartlake Stepping Tones Fountain	June 26, 2015		Interactive, heart-shaped fountain filled with Lego brick instruments that play music.
Theatre	June 26, 2015		Currently plays the show Lego Friends to the Rescue.

==== Miniland USA ====
Location Represented	Added	Image	Features
New York City	October 15, 2011		Rockefeller Plaza, Times Square, Statue of Liberty, Grand Central Terminal, Empire State Building, Guggenheim Museum, and Central Park Zoo.
Washington, D.C.	October 15, 2011		White House, United States Capitol, Smithsonian Institution Museums, WWII Memorial, Washington Monument, Jefferson Memorial, and parts of Georgetown.
Las Vegas	October 15, 2011		A realistic walk through along the Las Vegas Strip from the Welcome to Fabulous Las Vegas sign, past the Luxor, Excalibur, Mirage, Treasure Island, MGM Grand, Paris, and The Strat tower.
Florida	October 15, 2011 November 19, 2014 (I-Drive 360 Complex)		Florida Keys, the Everglades, Miami, Tampa, Central Florida, Daytona Beach, The Kennedy Space Center, St. Augustine, the Panhandle and the I-Drive 360 complex (Orlando Eye, Sea Life Orlando and Madame Tussauds Orlando).
Pirates	October 15, 2011		A pirate themed area featuring miniature Lego pirate ships.
Star Wars	November 9, 2012 May 4, 2018 (The Force Awakens model)		A collection of models from various planets in the Star Wars universe that also replicates famous scenes in the films. The planets and respective films from which scenes are represented are: Naboo from The Phantom Menace, Geonosis from Attack of the Clones, Kashyyyk and Mustafar from Revenge of the Sith, Tatooine from A New Hope, Hoth from The Empire Strikes Back Endor from Return of the Jedi, and Jakku from The Force Awakens. The area formerly featured Christophsis featured from Star Wars: The Clone Wars but was replaced with Jakku. Also featured are life-sized models of Darth Maul, R2-D2, Darth Vader, Rey and Chewbacca.

==== Duplo Valley ====
Attraction	Added	Image	Description
Duplo Train	May 23, 2014		A Duplo-themed train ride.
Duplo Tractor	May 23, 2014		A ride alongside a farm in a Duplo-themed tractor.
Duplo Valley Schoolhouse	November 14, 2019		An interactive play area also housing the park's baby care center.
Duplo Splash Pad	May 23, 2014		A toddler sized water play area.
Duplo Tot Spot	May 23, 2014		An interactive play area featuring Duplo bricks and a slide.

==== Lego Kingdoms ====
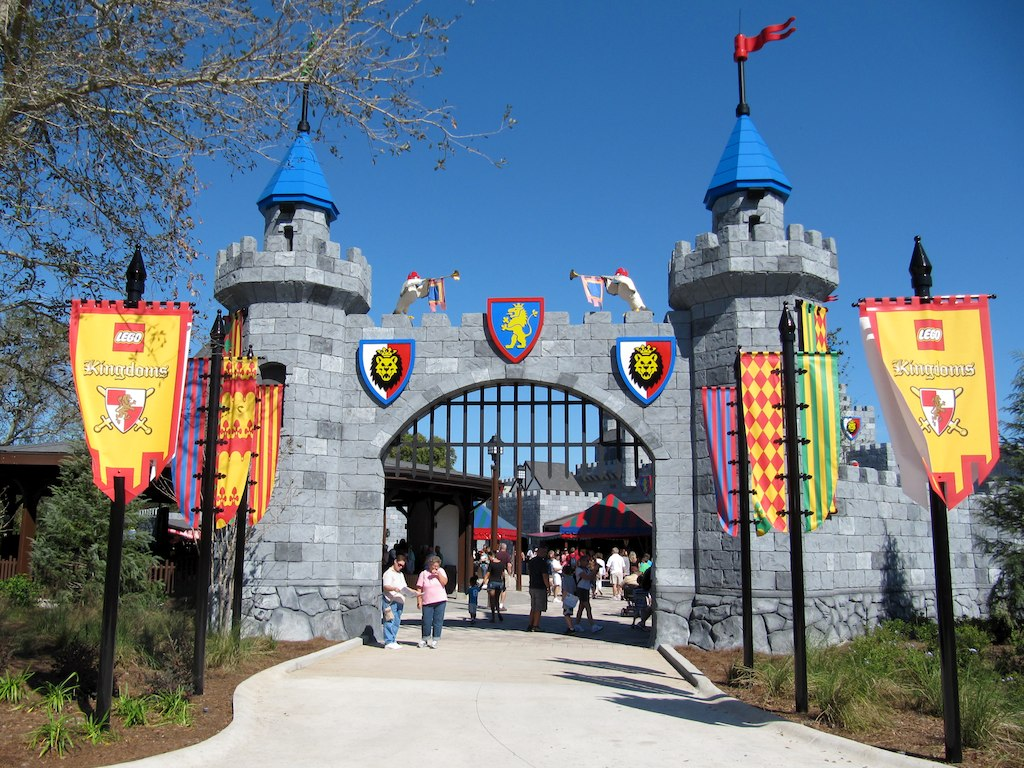
Lego Kingdoms

Attraction	Added	Image	Description
The Dragon	October 15, 2011		A steel family coaster manufactured by Vekoma which featured an indoor dark ride portion. Originally called Okeechobee Rampage and located at a different place within the park. During construction of Legoland Florida, the track was extended to include the dark ride segment and was put alongside the perimeter of the park.
The Royal Joust	October 15, 2011		A simulated 'joust' attraction where children ride Lego-themed horses through medieval scenes.
Merlin's Challenge	October 15, 2011		A mini Himalaya flat ride with a Lego model of Merlin as the centerpiece.
The Forestmen's Hideout	October 15, 2011		Large multi-level wooden playground designed for younger children, a structure with slides, rope ladders, and bridges.

==== Land of Adventure ====
Attraction	Added	Image	Description
Beetle Bounce	October 15, 2011		A dual junior drop tower ride manufactured by S&S – Sansei Technologies, formerly S&S Worldwide
Coastersaurus	October 15, 2011		A wooden roller coaster manufactured by Martin & Vleminckx and was formerly known as Triple Hurricane. On November 21, 2013, the ride received new Millennium Flyer trains from Great Coasters International.
Lost Kingdom Adventure	October 15, 2011		An interactive dark ride manufactured by Sally Corporation based on the Lego theme Adventurers.
Pharaoh's Revenge	October 15, 2011		An interactive play area involving small plastic balls (ball pit balls) moved around by air currents and suction.
Safari Trek	October 15, 2011		A jeep ride featuring life-sized Lego animal models.

==== Lego Ninjago World ====
Attraction	Added	Image	Description
Lego Ninjago: The Ride	January 12, 2017		An interactive 3D dark ride where four riders assume the powers of the ninjas and use their hand motions to swipe at various obstacles and villains.

==== The Lego Movie World ====
The area occupied by The Lego Movie World was previously themed as The World of Chima.

Attraction	added	Image	Description
The Lego Movie: Masters of Flight	March 27, 2019		Flying theatre motion simulator attraction where guests join Master Builders on a Triple Decker Flying Couch transporting riders all over The Lego Movie universe.
Unikitty's Disco Drop	March 27, 2019		Tower ride manufactured by Zierer. Drops, spins and bounces to the heights of Cloud Cuckoo land.
Battle of Bricksburg	March 27, 2019		Help defend Bricksburg by spraying down the DUPLO alien invaders. Beware, you will get wet! Retained from The World of Chima and renamed from The Quest for Chi Splash Battle, which opened in 2013.

==== Lego City ====
Attraction	Added	Image	Description
Driving School	October 15, 2011		A “real-life” driving experience for children ages 6 through 13, where children receive their official Legoland driver's license which can be upgraded to have their photo and watch a video on how to drive.
Jr. Driving School	October 15, 2011		A smaller version of the driving school attraction for children ages 3 through 5.
Coast Guard Academy	October 15, 2011		Self-propelled boat-ride that travels a winding watercourse.
Rescue Academy	October 15, 2011		Competitive team attraction where groups propel a hand pumped truck in a race down a street to douse a simulated building "fire" or to take down a "criminal" and return the truck.

==== Lego Technic ====
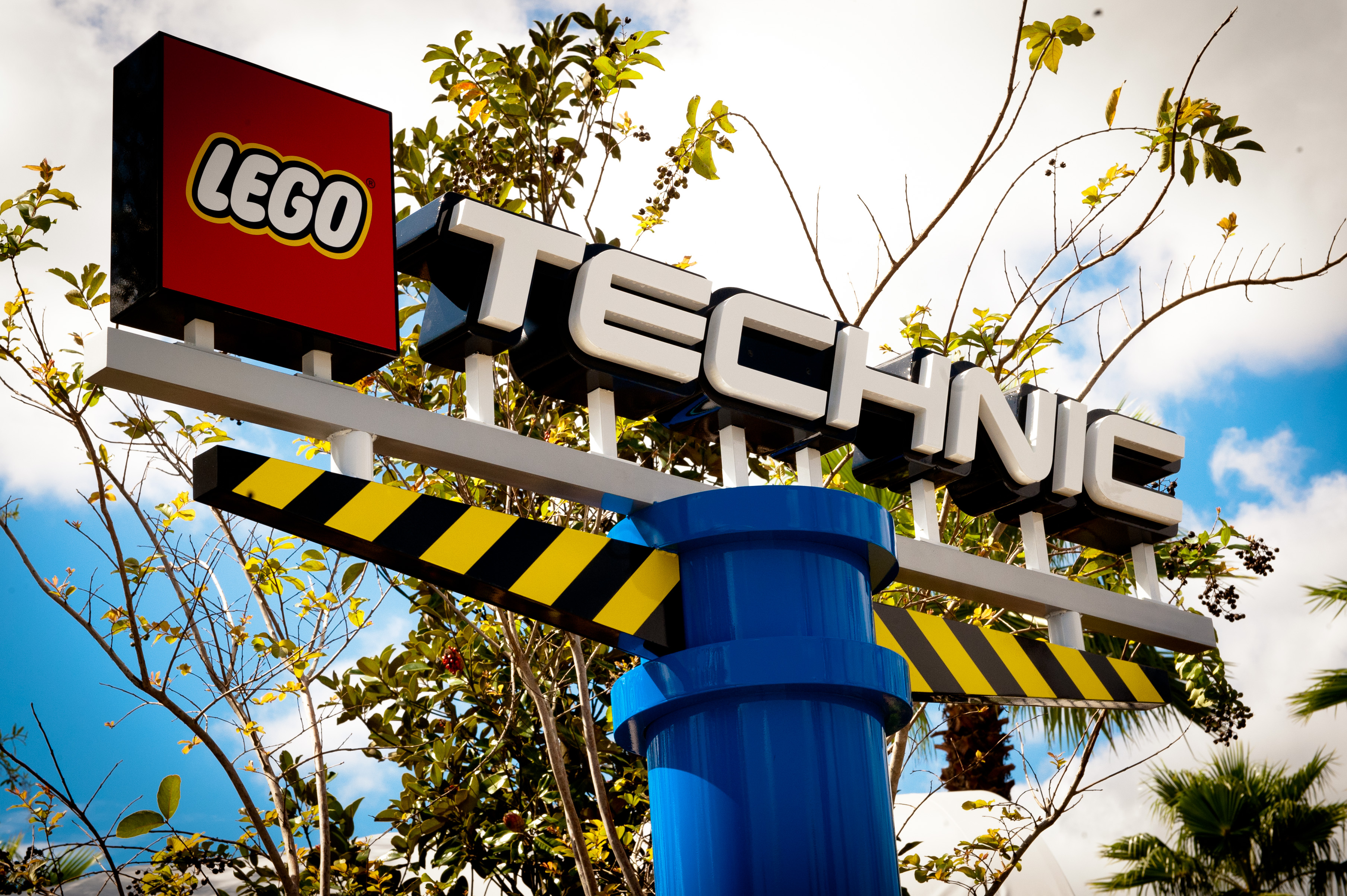
Lego Technic sign

Attraction	Added	Manufacturer	Image	Description
AQUAZONE Wave Racers	October 15, 2011	Zierer		A dual water carousel where guests spin out over the water while off-riders try to blast water cannons in the ride's pond.
The Great Lego Race	October 15, 2011 (as Lego Technic Test Track) March 23, 2018 (as The Great Lego Race)	Mack Rides		A large wild mouse coaster with a VR experience. Replaced Project X, the Florida version of Lego Technic Test Track. Operated at Legoland Windsor as Jungle Coaster from 2004 to 2009.
Technicycle	October 15, 2011	Zamperla		A pedal-powered spinning machine that propels riders into the air.

=== Lego Galaxy ===
Lego Galaxy is a sci-fi/space-themed land that opened on February 27, 2026 featuring Galacticoaster, an indoor family coaster.

Attraction	Added	Manufacturer	Image	Description
Galacticoaster	2026	Art Engineering		A space-themed, indoor, and custom-designed "spinning" steel roller coaster. Riders can customize their Lego space vehicle in four phases (Nose, Tail, Wings, Special Features) with over 625 combinations. Coaster reaches speeds of up to 40 mph.

==== Imagination Zone ====
Attraction	Added	Image	Description
Build & Test	October 15, 2011		An exhibit where guests can build a Lego car and test it on the digitally timed track.
Kid Power Towers	October 15, 2011		A set of towers where guests can hoist themselves up to the top then enjoy a “free-fall” to the bottom.
Lego Mindstorms	October 15, 2011		An exhibit where guests can build and program computerized Lego Mindstorms robots.
WB Games Zone	2012		A room where players can try out levels of the Lego video games.

==== Pirates' Cove ====
Attraction	Added	Image	Description
The Battle For Brickbeard's Bounty	October 15, 2011		A live-action water ski show performed daily on Lake Eloise Lake, featuring a mix of human skiers and Lego costumed characters such as the pirate Captain Brickbeard. Legoland Florida announced that the updated show, Brickbeard's Watersports Stunt Show, will debut in February 2021, as a part of the park's 10th birthday.(Both now closed.)
Pirate River Quest	January 12, 2023		Pirate River Quest is a 20-minute, family-friendly boat ride, where guests help Captain Redbeard find lost treasure by navigating the historic Cypress Gardens canals. The slow-paced, mild adventure features LEGO pirate scenes, monkeys, a kraken, and scenic views, making it suitable for all ages, though younger children must wear life jackets. It's included with park admission and offers a mix of Lego storytelling and natural beauty.

==== Cypress Gardens ====
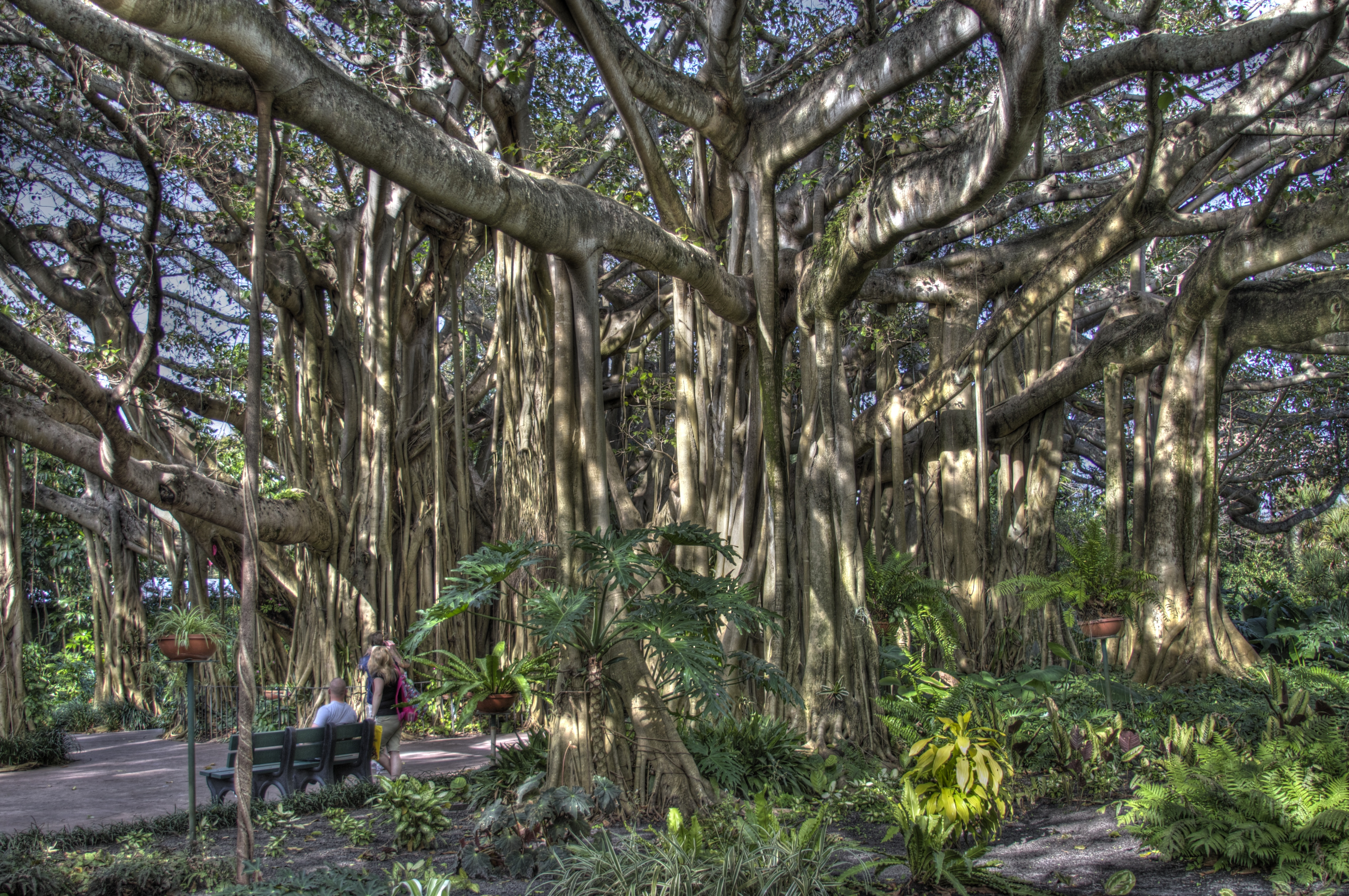
Cypress Gardens

Legoland Florida Resort fully reopened the original botanical gardens from the former Cypress Gardens park in March 2014. The gardens were the initial attraction at the site, which first opened in 1936. After the theme park reopened as Legoland Florida, the Oriental Gardens and Florida Pool within Cypress Gardens remained closed while repairs and landscaping were performed. The Florida Pool, named for its shape, was originally built for the 1953 film Easy to Love, starring Esther Williams.

The gardens are owned by Polk County and were listed on the U.S. National Register of Historic Places in April 2014.

=== Legoland Water Park ===
Attraction	Added	Image	Description
Lego Wave Pool	May 26, 2012		A gentle wave pool; formerly known as Kowabunga Bay at Splash Island.
Twin Chasers	May 26, 2012		Two 375-foot (114 m) long tube water slides; formerly known as Tonga Tubes at Splash Island.
Splash Out	May 26, 2012		Three body slides each with a 60-foot (18 m) drop; formerly known as VooDoo Plunge at Splash Island.
Joker Soaker	May 26, 2012		Children's water play area; formerly known as Polynesian Adventure at Splash Island.
Build-A-Raft River	May 26, 2012		A 1,000-foot (300 m) long lazy river with interactive inner tubes that had a baseplate on which riders could stack floating Lego bricks. Formerly known as Paradise River at Splash Island.
Duplo Splash Safari	May 26, 2012		Toddler's water play area; this area was the only one newly constructed for the Legoland Water Park.

=== Peppa Pig Theme Park ===
Attraction	Added	Image	Description
Daddy Pig's Roller Coaster	February 24, 2022		A Zamperla Junior Coaster themed after Daddy Pig's Car.
Peppa Pig's Balloon Ride	February 24, 2022		A Technical Park Samba Balloon ride that provides a view of the park.
Grandad Dog's Pirate Boat Ride	February 24, 2022		A rotating boat ride set within the "Pirate Island" location.
Grampy Rabbit's Dinosaur Adventure	February 24, 2022		A themed tracked ride with cars themed like George's toy dinosaur.
Mr. Bull's High Striker	February 24, 2022		A small kiddy drop tower.
Peppa's Pedal Bike Tour/George's Tricycle Trail	February 24, 2022		A themed Bike/Tricycle attraction.
Muddy Puddles Splash Pad	February 24, 2022		A water play area.
George's Fort	February 24, 2022		A themed Maze attraction.
Grandpa Pig's Greenhouse	February 24, 2022		A themed walk-through attraction.
Peppa Pig's Treehouse	February 24, 2022		A themed play-area/treehouse.
Madame Gazelle's Nature Trail	February 24, 2022		A themed Nature-Trail attraction.
Mr. Potato's Showtime Arena	February 24, 2022		A show stage that showcases Peppa Pig-themed live shows with costumed characters.
The Cinema	February 24, 2022		An indoor attraction that broadcasts episodes from the Peppa Pig series.

=== Former attractions ===
The following are individual attractions that have closed formerly operated throughout the park's history:

Attraction	Section	Added	Removed	Image	Description
Cragger's Swamp	The World of Chima	July 3, 2013	May 29, 2017		An interactive water play area.
Flying School	Lego City	October 15, 2011	August 16, 2023		A Suspended Family Coaster manufacturer by Vekoma themed around an airport. The attraction was previously called Swamp Thing.
Fresh from Florida Greenhouse	Fun Town	2012	2015		A conservatory where guest could walk through and be educated on foods made in the state of Florida. The conservatory was demolished and replaced along with some of the mansion's grounds with the Heartlake City section.
Island in the Sky	The Beginning	October 15, 2011	2017		A 150 feet (46 m) rotating platform ride that provided a 360° view of the park that opened with the park. After standing dormant throughout 2017 on January 25, 2018, Legoland Florida officially announced its closure due to the age of the attraction.
Junior Fire Academy	Duplo Village	October 15, 2011	2013		A small roundabout where children could control a fire truck and attempt to douse fires, similar to the Rescue Academy attraction across the park.
Lego Factory Tour	Fun Town	October 15, 2011	2014		A walk-through attraction that taught visitors how a Lego brick was made. The building also shared space with the model shop, where visitors could peer in seeing the park's master builder's build the models for not only Legoland Florida but for the Legoland parks and discovery centers around the world. The walk-through attraction closed around 2014 to expand the model shop. The model shop was then moved off-site to a larger facility and space eventually became a store housing a "Pick a Brick" wall as well as discounted sets. It reopened as Lego Factory Experience.
Quest for Chi	The World of Chima	July 3, 2013	May 29, 2017		A splash battle attraction manufactured by Mack Rides
Speedorz Arena	The World of Chima	July 3, 2013	May 29, 2017		An interactive Lego play station where children raced their Speedorz creations.

As of 2018 only one section of the park has closed while another has been rethemed:

The World of Chima

The World of Chima was a section based on Lego's Legends of Chima sets and was sponsored by Cartoon Network throughout the area's lifespan. The area opened on July 3, 2013, and was the park's first new land. It was closed on May 29, 2017, and was replaced by The Lego Movie World.

Duplo Village

Duplo Village originally opened with the park on October 15, 2011. On October 3, 2013, it was announced that the area would be enhanced and rethemed as Duplo Valley. One attraction would be removed while the others were re-themed.

== Gallery ==
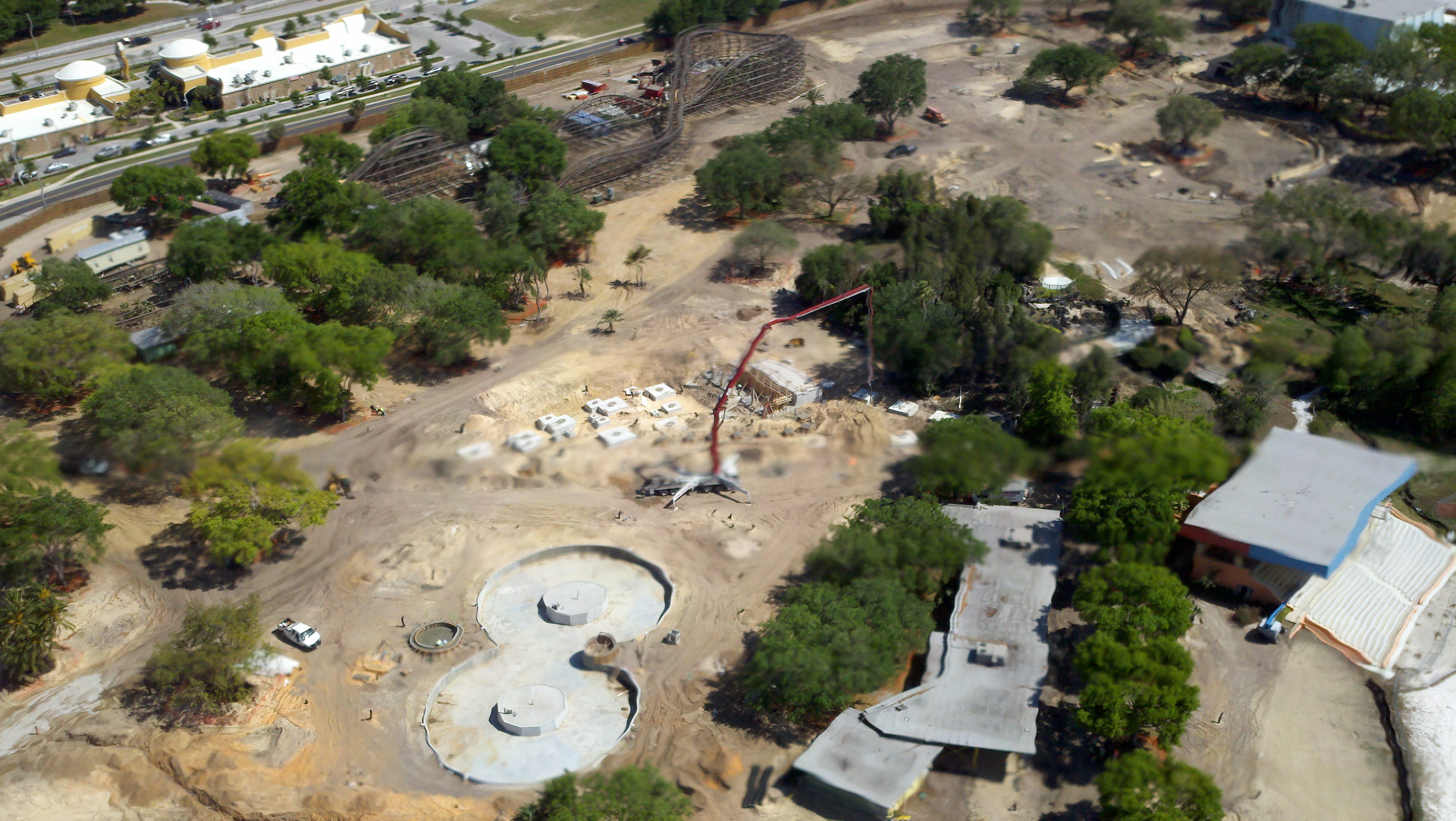
Aerial photo during construction, March 2011. The dual carousel pond for AQUAZONE is completed in the foreground, while Coastersaurus awaits refurbishment in the background.

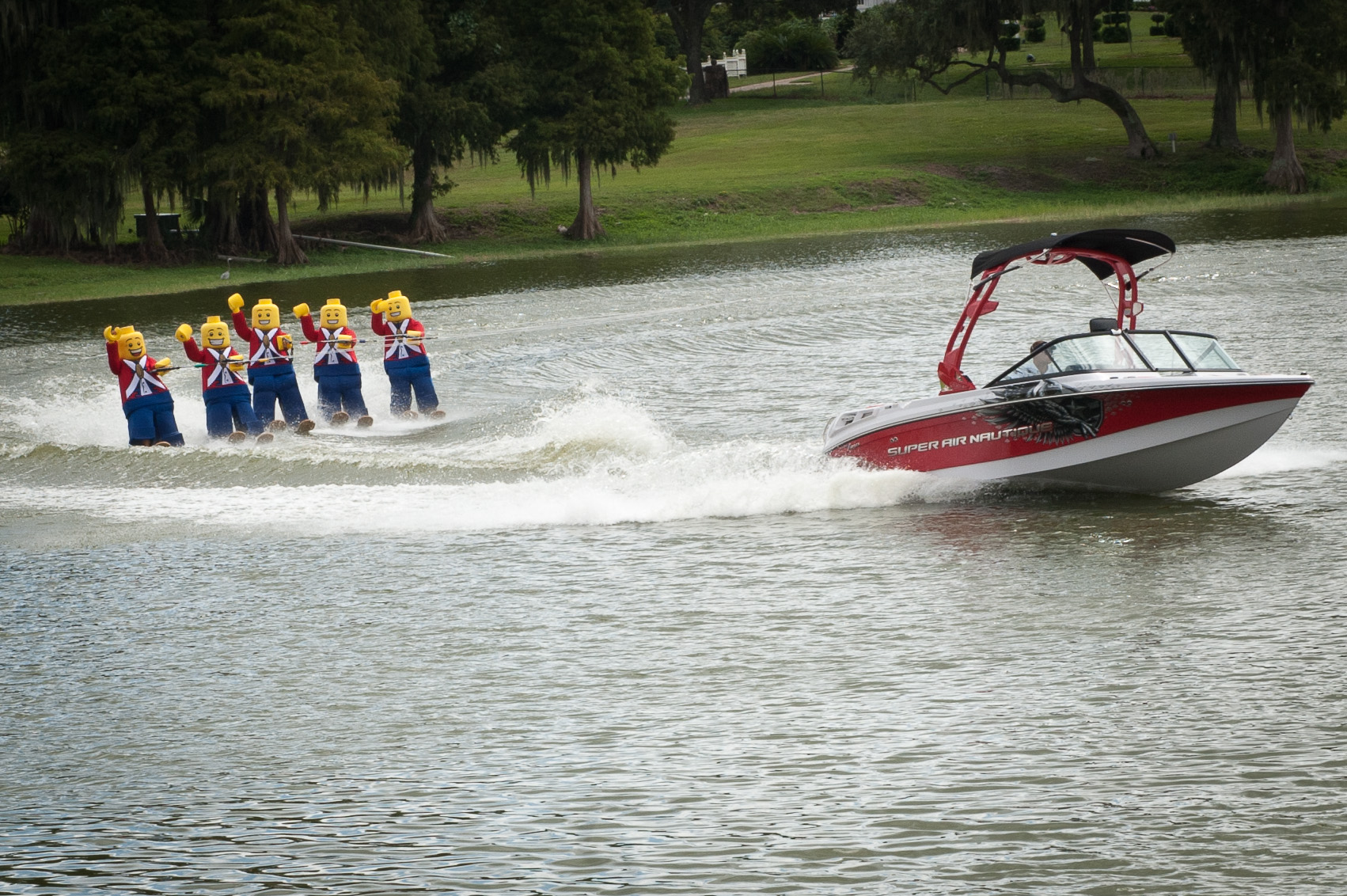
Lake Eloise

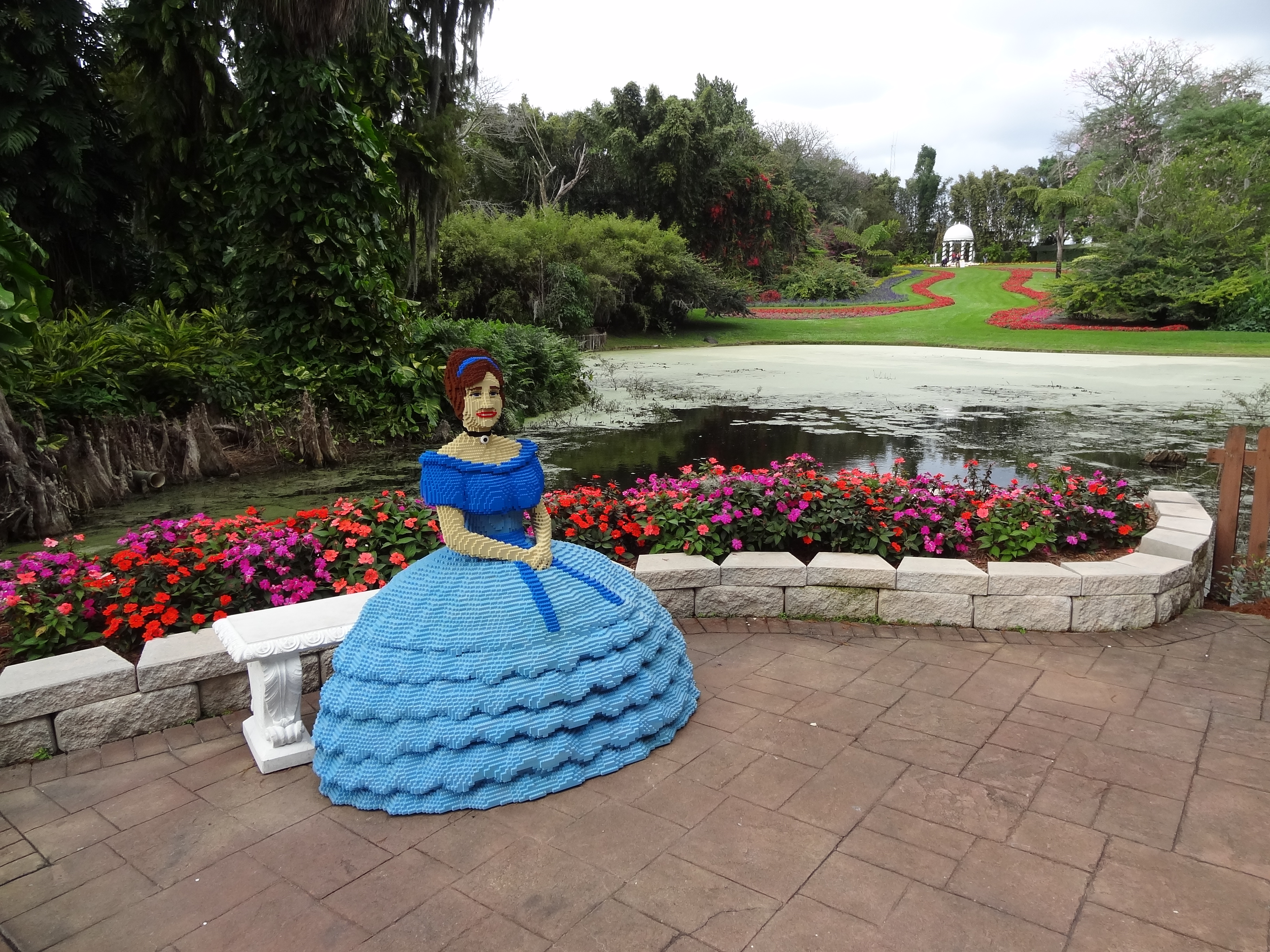
Cypress Gardens

== See also ==
- 2011 in amusement parks
- Bok Tower Gardens
- Universal Orlando
- Walt Disney World
