= Lost Kingdom Adventure =

Theme park ride

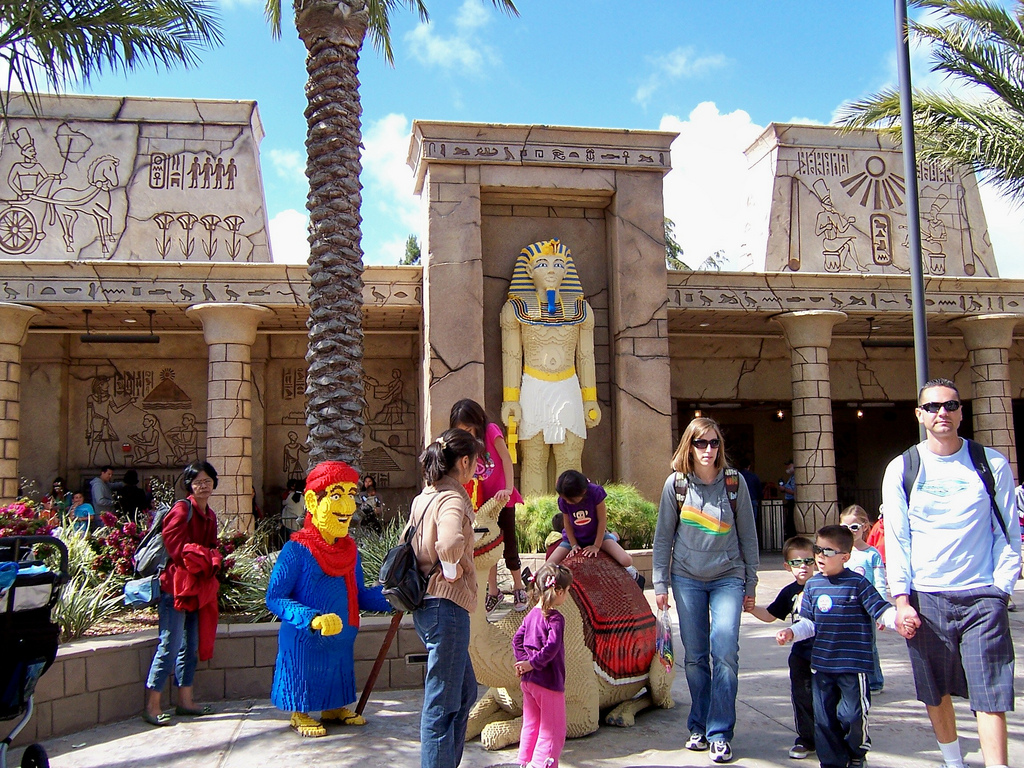
- The entrance of the Lost Kingdom Adventure at Legoland California

Legoland California
- Area: Land of Adventure
- Status: Operating
- Opening date: April 2008

Legoland Deutschland
- Area: Land der Phraraonen
- Status: Operating
- Opening date: March 23, 2013

Legoland Florida
- Area: Land of Adventure
- Status: Operating
- Opening date: October 15, 2011

Legoland Japan
- Area: Adventure
- Status: Operating
- Opening date: 2017

Legoland Malaysia
- Status: Operating
- Opening date: September 15, 2012

Legoland Windsor
- Name: Laser Raiders
- Area: Kingdom of the Pharaohs
- Status: Operating
- Opening date: March 20, 2009

Legoland Billund
- Name: The Temple
- Area: Adventureland
- Status: Operating
- Opening date: 2010

Ride statistics
- Attraction type: Shooting dark ride
- Manufacturer: Sally Corporation
- Designer: Legoland California and Sally Corporation
- Model: Interactive Dark Ride
- Theme: Lego Adventurers – Egypt
- Length: 338 ft (103 m)
- Capacity: 600–1000 riders per hour
- Vehicle type: Lego-style Jeeps
- Vehicles: Bertazzon, Mack Rides (Germany)
- Riders per vehicle: 4
- Rows: 2
- Riders per row: 2
- Duration: Approximately 3 minutes
- Virtual queue: Reserve 'N' Ride available

Lost Kingdom Adventure is a Sally Corporation Interactive Dark Ride located at Legoland theme parks around the globe. Locations include Legoland California, Legoland Windsor (where it is known as Laser Raiders), Legoland Billund (where it is known as The Temple), Legoland Florida, Legoland Deutschland, and Legoland Malaysia.

== History ==
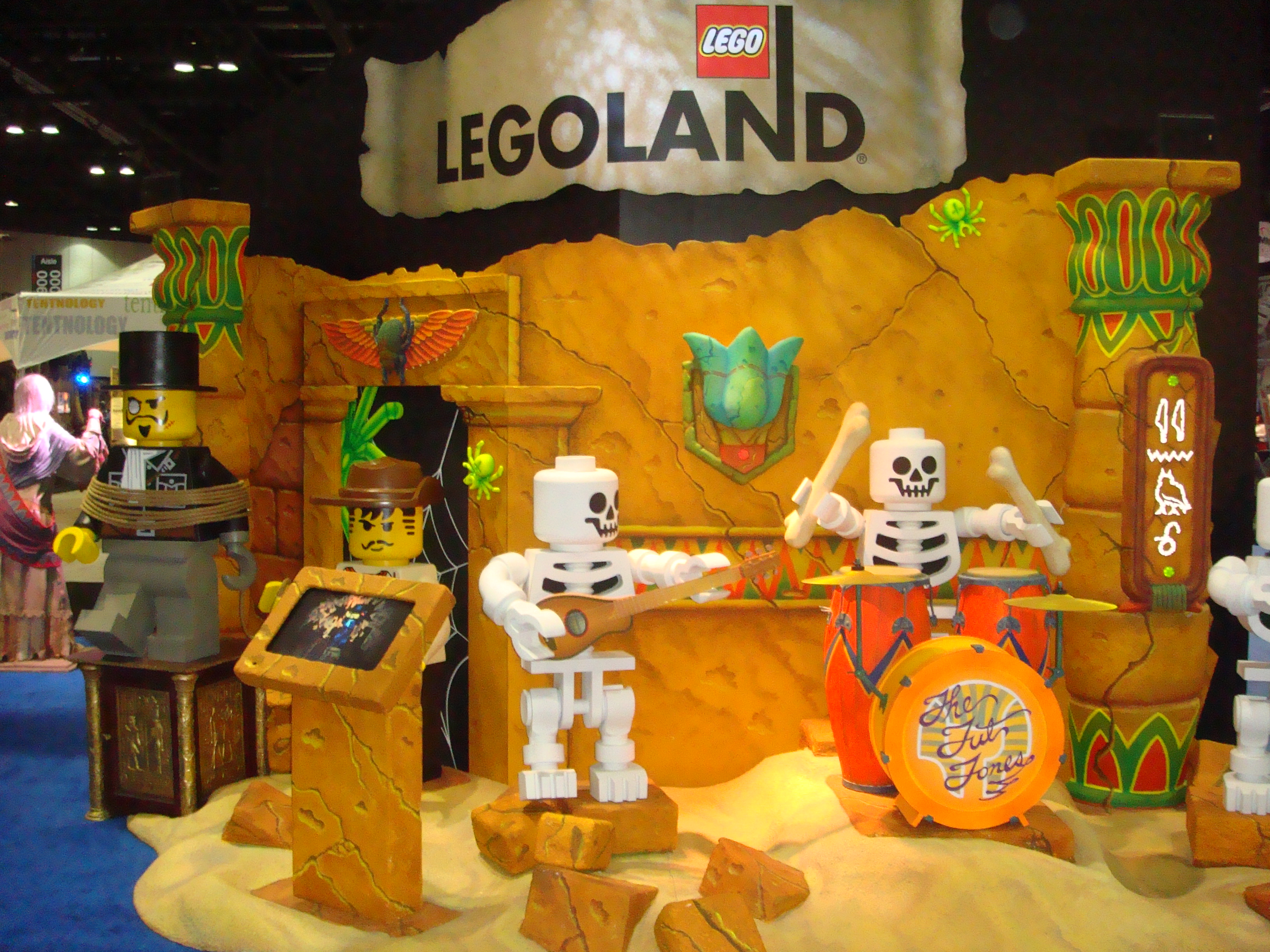
One of the ride's sets on display at IAAPA's trade show in 2011

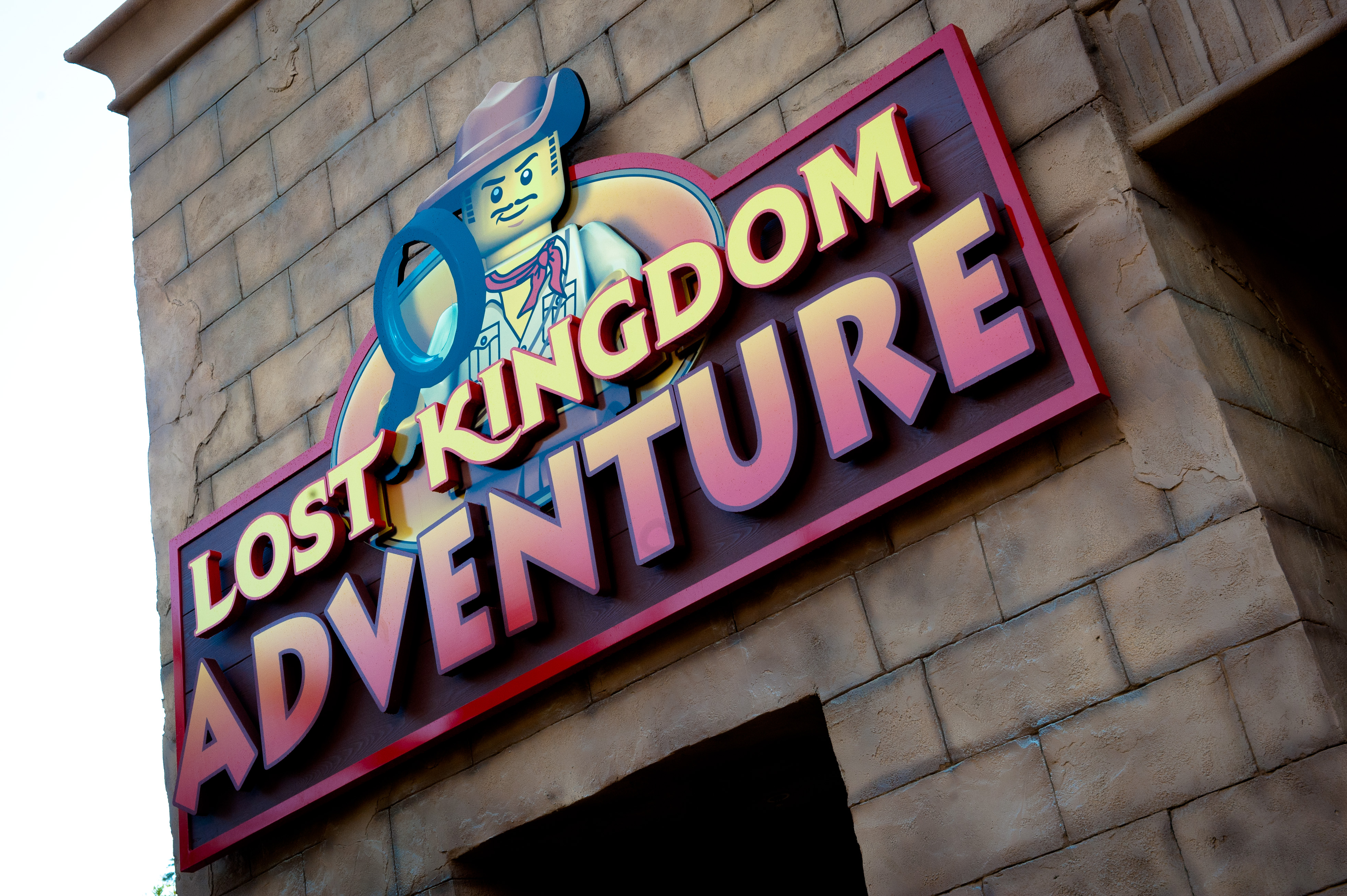
Lost Kingdom Adventure at Legoland Florida

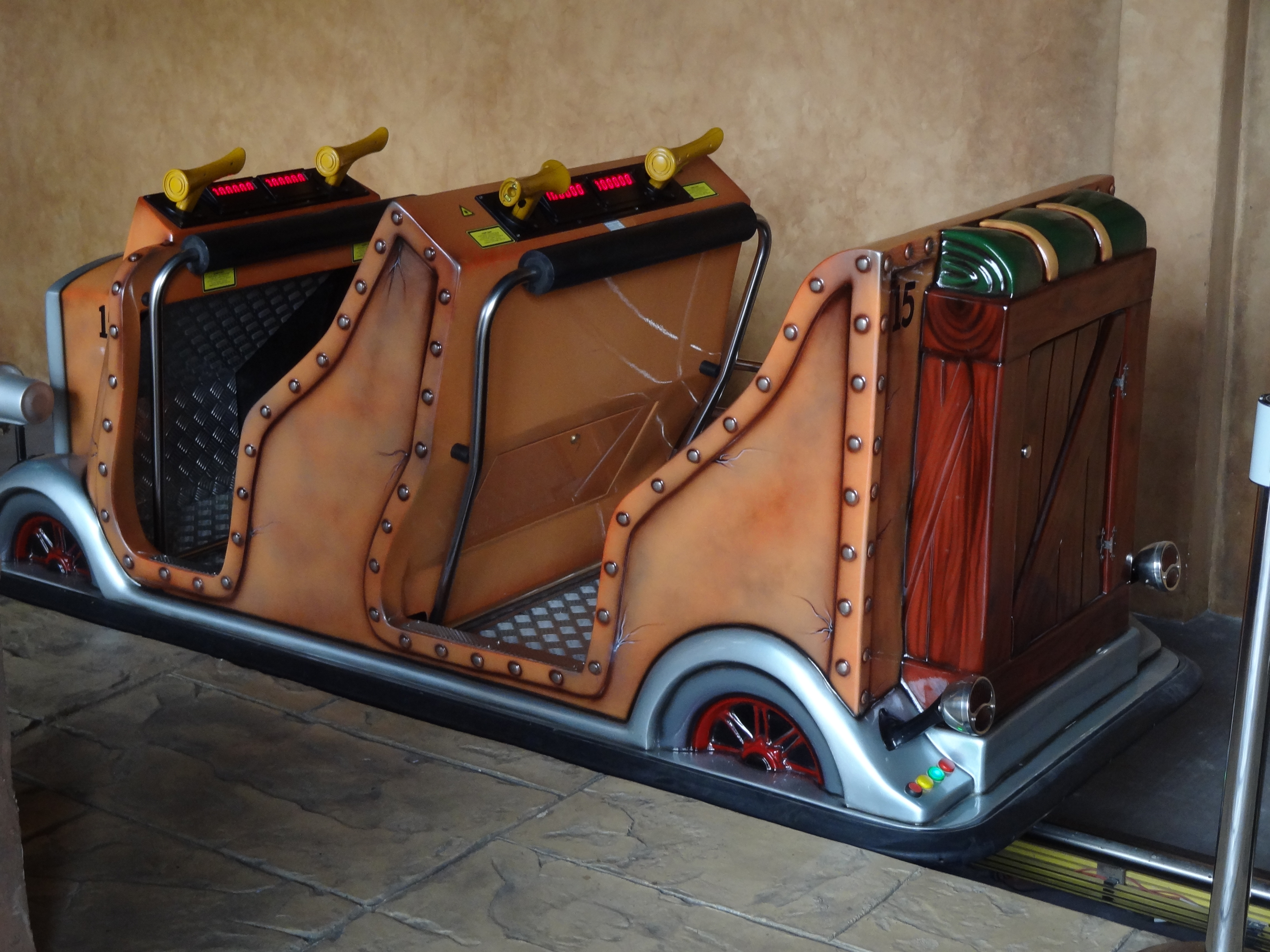
Vehicle at Legoland Malaysia

In late 2007, Merlin Entertainments announced that they would be adding Lost Kingdom Adventure to their Legoland California theme park in early 2008. In April 2008, the ride officially opened to the public. Nearly one year later on March 20, 2009, Laser Raiders (a near duplicate of Lost Kingdom Adventure) opened in Legoland Windsor. Following the success of the two rides, Merlin Entertainments signed a deal in 2011 with Sally Corporation to bring Lost Kingdom Adventure to both Legoland Florida and Legoland Malaysia. The two attractions opened on October 15, 2011, and September 15, 2012, respectively. All of these installations featured animatronics by Sally Corporation and ride systems by Bertazzon Rides.

In 2012, it was announced that Legoland Deutschland would be receiving a duplicate of the ride for 2013. The ride officially opened at the start of the 2013 season on March 23. The animatronics and ride system were provided by Mack Rides. Another clone opened at Legoland Billund under the name: The Temple for the 2010 season.

== Ride experience ==
Lost Kingdom Adventure is themed to the Lego Adventurers Egypt theme of Lego sets. The story consists of Pippin Reed being kidnapped by Sam Sinister. Riders join Johnny Thunder to save Pippin Reed and defeat Sam Sinister. Riders board their vehicle and pass through many scenes including a spider's lair, dancing hieroglyphics, a professor's lab, a mummy, a gauntlet, and a treasure room. Riders earn points for shooting specified items with the highest score reported as being around 90,000. Many animatronics also feature in the ride.

== Ride system ==
Lost Kingdom Adventure is manufactured by United States-based Sally Corporation. The ride vehicles are manufactured by Bertazzon or Mack Rides and seat four people in two rows of two. The vehicles are themed to be Lego-style Jeeps and feature lap bar restraints. Each rider has a laser blaster mounted in front of them. This is used to shoot at objects throughout the ride and gain points. Each rider's points tally is displayed on a small screen next to the laser blaster. These vehicles run along a guide rail which is 338 feet (103 m) long. The ride itself is located within a show building between 6,000 and 8,600 square feet (560 and 800 m^{2}) in area. A total of ten black-lit scenes are featured in the ride. The capacity of the ride varies between 600 and 1000 riders per hour depending on the number of vehicles in operation which is usually between 10 and 17 vehicles.

== See also ==
- Scooby-Doo's Haunted Mansion
- Ghost Blasters
- Justice League: Alien Invasion 3D
- Tomb Blaster
