= Legoland Deutschland Resort =

Lego theme park in Bavaria, Germany

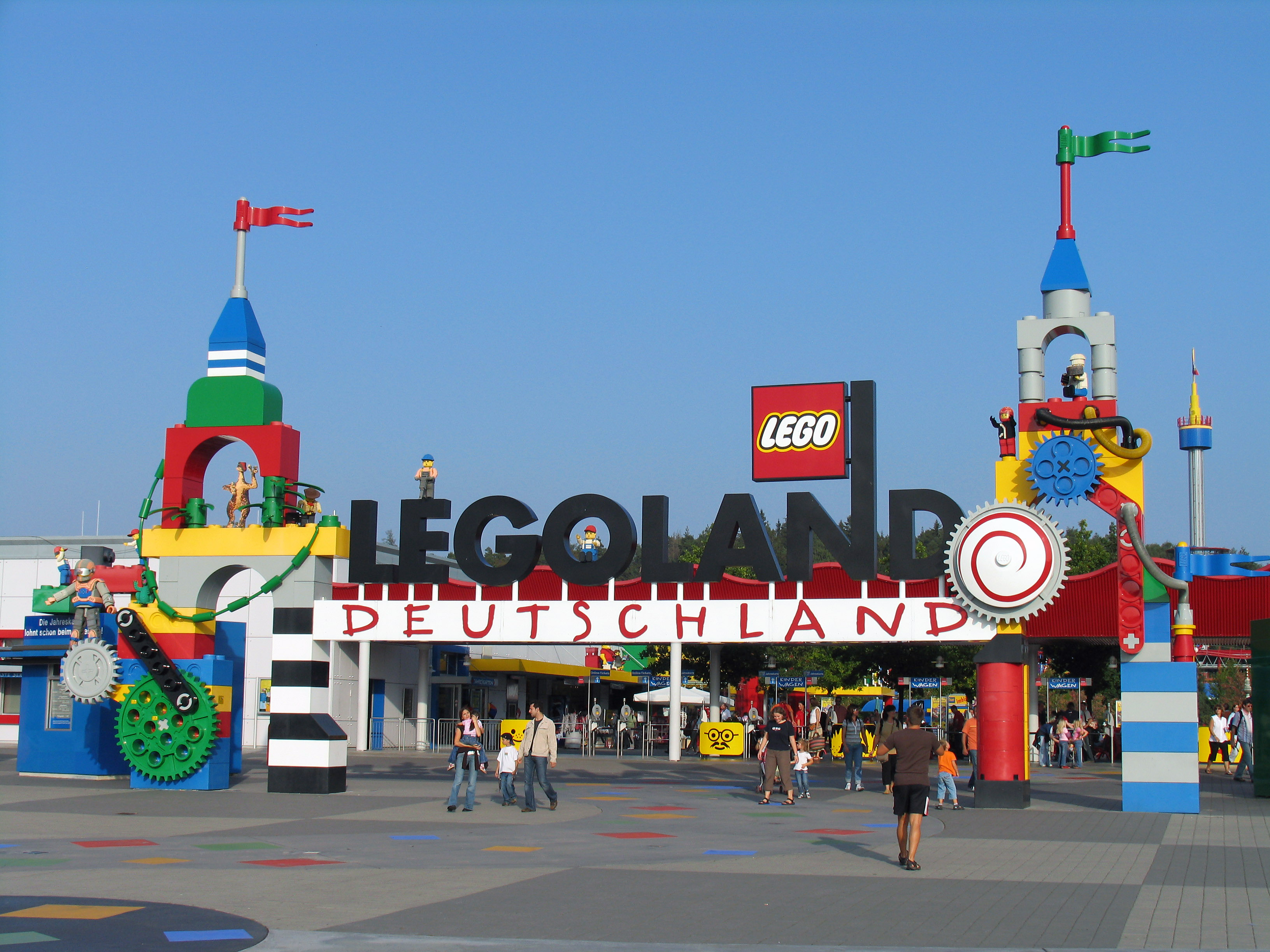
- Interactive map of Legoland Deutschland Resort
- Location: Günzburg, Germany
- Coordinates: 48°25′28″N 10°17′59″E
- Status: Operating
- Opened: May 17, 2002; 24 years ago
- Owner: Merlin Entertainments
- General manager: Manuela Stone
- Operating season: April–November
- Attendance: 1.7 million (2019)
- Area: 107 acres (43 ha)
- Website: www.legoland.de

Legoland Deutschland Resort (known in English as Legoland Germany) is a Legoland park located in Günzburg in Bavaria, roughly halfway between Munich and Stuttgart, which opened in 2002. At opening it was 43.5 hectares (107 acres) in area, and it is one of the four most popular theme parks in Germany. The Miniland contains Lego reproductions of various German and European cities and rural landscapes.

== History ==
Legoland Deutschland was opened by the LEGO Group on May 17, 2002, in Günzburg, Germany, nine months earlier than planned. During the initial operating year, the park welcomed 1.35 million visitors. In 2005 the four Legoland parks were sold to Merlin Entertainments in a 375 million Euro deal. Although generally credited as the fourth Legoland park to open and the first in Germany, an earlier theme park (now Hansa-Park) in Sierksdorf used the Legoland branding under licence from the Lego Group from 1973 to 1976.

All of the lighting for the park was done by Gallegos Lighting Design which had done the lighting for Legoland California and the sound and video production for the park was done by Edward Technologies Inc. The park features Lego explore centers, roller coasters, water attractions and shows. When it opened in 2002, it contained 40 attractions, 7 themed lands and was made out of 50 million Lego bricks. 10 years later, the park expanded to eight “adventure worlds” with 50 attractions and 55 million Lego bricks. Legoland Deutschland is home to the world's largest Lego building, representing Munich's Allianz Arena and weighing 1.5 tons with dimensions of 5 meters in width and 1 meter in height. Legoland Deutschland also contains many other world records such as the largest Lego flower bed (2007), largest amount of energy generated through cycling underwater (2010), highest Lego tower (2010), largest Lego mosaic (2011), longest Lego millipede (2002), and the largest Lego brick (2005).

The park celebrated its ten-year anniversary in 2012: in that occasion, the attraction Flying Ninjago debuted, and six scenes in Miniland based on the Lego Ninjago toy series were added.

On April 22, 2013, Merlin Entertainments Group introduced an app entitled “LEGOLAND Deutschland” available for Android and Apple devices. The app features an interactive park map, ticket purchasing, a “Find my car” feature, and a day planner that has all of the day's events listed for visitors. Legoland Deutschland also introduced the electronic “express pass” which allows guests to purchase either a Standard, Premium or Gold express pass, allowing guests reserve a spot in the queue line for select attractions. In 2013, the CEO of the park, Aksel Pedersen, announced the largest expansion in the history of Legoland Deutschland and consisted of 86,000 Lego bricks. The park expanded by building the “Kingdom of the Pharaohs” themed land within Adventure Land which added the ride "Temple X-pedition". Additionally in 2013, the park expanded the Star Wars Miniland Model Display when they added a Yoda Lego model display. In 2014, Legoland Deutschland introduced the 5 million Lego block X-Wing Model Display which used to be in the theme park in the Hero Factory attraction hall for a limited time. Also Legoland introduced the new Königsburg hotel with 68 rooms. On March 28, 2015, Martin Kring, the then new general manager of Legoland, introduced the LEGO City Polizeistation, a walkthrough maze with special effects. The attraction was built into an existing building in the Imagination themed area. In 2016 High Five in Miniland and the new Drachenburg at Holiday Village were opened. In 2017 Ninjago World was opened based on the Lego Ninjago theme. The area includes LEGO Ninjago: The Ride and Lloyd’s Spinjitzu Spinner (opened in 2020). The following year, Legoland opened its next hotel. The Pirateninsel Hotel (Pirate Island Hotel) is based on a pirate theme and was constructed at a price of 26,6 million Euros. The building offers place for up to 594 guests.

On May 10, 2019, Manuela Stone, the former F&B director, took over the position as general manager from Martin Kring. In 2020, because of the COVID-19 pandemic, the park opened late on May 30 with only half of the normal capacity. On August 11, 2022, two roller coasters at the theme park collided with one another, causing more than thirty injuries.

In September 2022, it was announced that the park would be receiving €15.5 million investment for the creation of a new area to open at the start of the 2023 season. The new area would follow the LEGO Mythica theme first found at Legoland Windsor Resort. Spanning 1.2 hectares the new area would be the largest and most expensive expansion of the park since its opening in 2002. It would feature a drop tower, roller coaster and a children's playground. The drop tower is named Fire & Ice Tower and stands at 9 meters tall, this attraction also featured as a part of the original LEGO Mythica installment at Legoland Windsor Resort. The rollercoaster is a Bolliger & Mabillard Wing coaster named Maximus - Der Flug des Wächters (Maximus - The Guardians Flight) currently the only one of its type in a Legoland park, the ride features two inversions and is also the only Legoland roller coaster to feature inversions. The area's opening coincided with the beginning of the 2023 season on the March 25, 2023.

On June 30, 2023, it was announced that a second park would open in the resort in 2024, based on the animated television series Peppa Pig called Peppa Pig Park Günzburg. It will be located next to the Legoland Deutschland theme park and is the second Legoland resort to receive a non-Lego attraction and Peppa Pig theme park after Florida. The park opened on May 19, 2024.

== Rides and attractions ==
=== Roller Coasters ===
| Ride name | Manufacturer | Type | Year opened | Themed land | Status |
|---|---|---|---|---|---|
| Feuerdrache; Fire Dragon | Zierer | Family Sit Down | 2002 | Knights Kingdom | Operating |
| Drachenjagd; Dragon Hunt | Gerstlauer | Family Sit Down | June 2003 | Knights Kingdom | Operating |
| Das Große LEGO Rennen The Great Lego Race | Mack Rides | Wild Mouse | 2002 | Lego X-treme | Operating |
| Maximus - Der Flug des Wächters MAXIMUS – The Guardian’s Flight | Bolliger & Mabillard | Wing Coaster | March 2023 | Mythica | Operating |

Themed areas and key locations within Legoland Deutschland Resort

=== Lands ===
==== Entrance Area/Eingangsbereich ====
The entrance area is where the guests first enter the park through one of twenty entrance gates. There are three shops and one food outlet in this area, and it is also where guests can purchase an Express Pass and visit tourist information booths. At the information booths, guests can find out more information about the park. At the reception outside of the park, guests are able to check in the Holiday Village.

==== Miniland ====
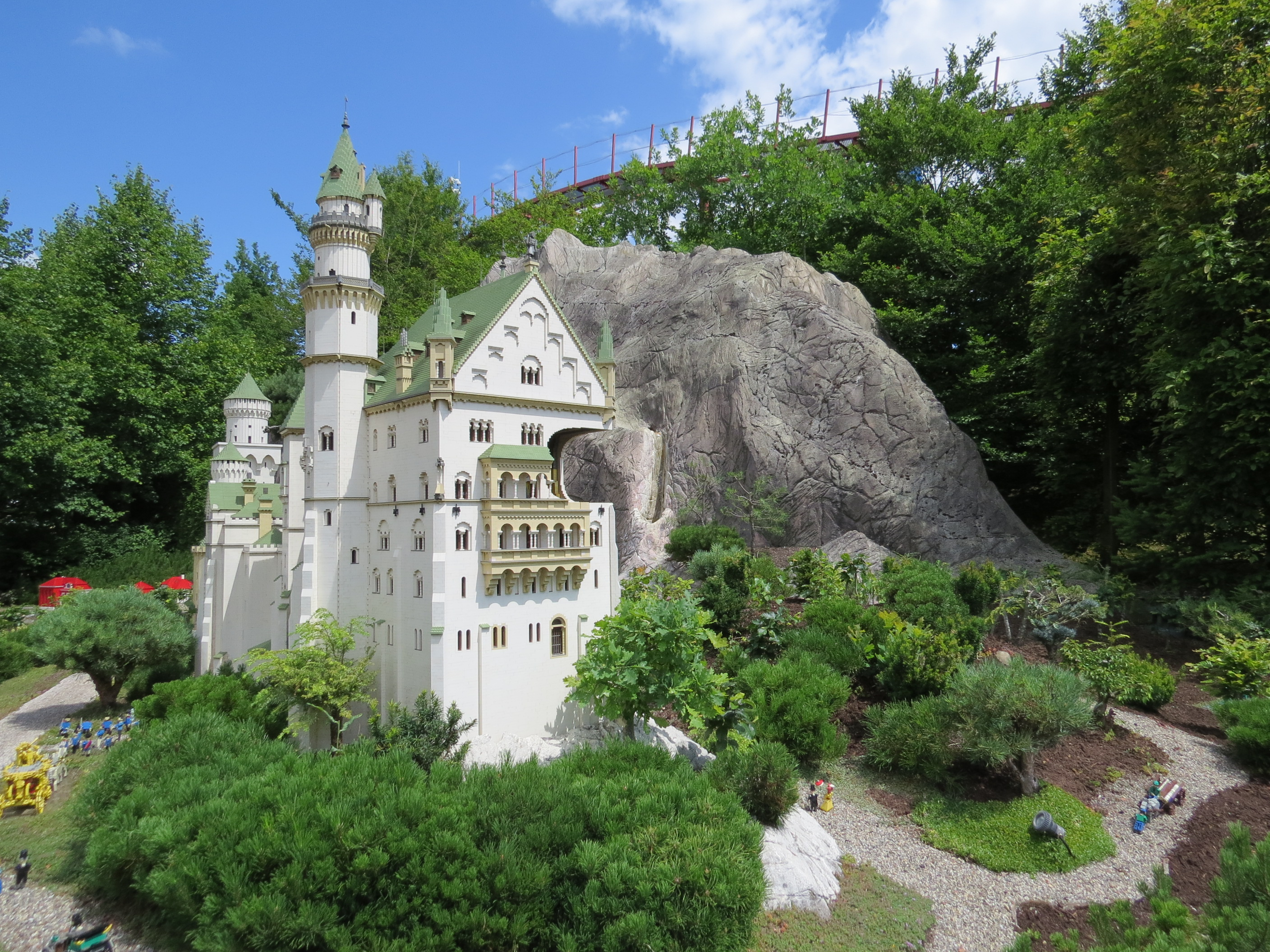
Neuschwanstein Castle model (2017)

Miniland contains 1:20 scale recreations of various European cities and landscapes such as Berlin, Frankfurt, Venice, Swabian Village, The Netherlands, Hamburg Harbour, the Neuschwanstein Castle and several tall buildings from around the world including Legoland's own observation tower which is also to scale. All of the recreations were built entirely of 25 million Lego bricks. Many of the people, animals and vehicles can be moved by hitting a button. Miniland also housed several Star Wars models: seven scenes reproduced from the franchise, including large Yoda and Darth Vader models. These Star Wars models were removed after the 2019 season.

==== Lego City ====
- Airport (Flughafen): Riders will ride in rotating Lego airplanes that move in a circular motion and riders control how high they go.
- Harbour Cruise (Hafen Rundfahrt): A boat ride where riders get to steer themselves around a monitored pond.
- Hyundai Legoland Driving School (Hyundai LEGOLAND Fahrschule): Children 7-13 get to drive around a test track and potentially receive a Legoland drivers license. This attraction has an additional fee.
- Hyundai Legoland Junior Driving School (Hyundai LEGOLAND Junior Fahschule): The Hyundai Legoland Driving School made for children under 7. This attraction has an additional fee.
- Lego Factory (LEGO Fabrik): A tour of how Lego bricks are produced as well as the manufacturing process behind Lego.
- Legoland Express: A train ride around Legoland Deutschland.
- Power Builder: Riders get on a modified industrial robot and get a wild or mild ride. The ride is a modified Kuka robot.
- Shipyard Playground (Die Werft): Children can climb and crawl around a playground designed to look like a pirate ship.

==== Little Asia ====
- Flying Ninjago: This ride is based on the Lego Series Ninjago. The attraction takes riders 22 m in the air as the ride spins horizontally and rotates vertically back and forth. This ride was the first sky fly tower built by Gerstlauer

==== Knights Kingdom/Land der Ritter ====
- Caterpillar Ride (Raupenritt): A fast spinning carrousel for any age.
- Royal Joust (Ritterturnier): Children ride on a Lego designed horse around a single track.
- Fire Dragon (Feuerdrache): It is a roller coaster with the vehicle designed as a dragon travelling through a medieval castle.
- Dragon Hunt (Drachenjagd): A smaller roller coaster themed to mine carts.
- Gold Panning (Goldsuche): Guests can pan for gold and trade in gold for a golden medallion.

==== Imagination ====
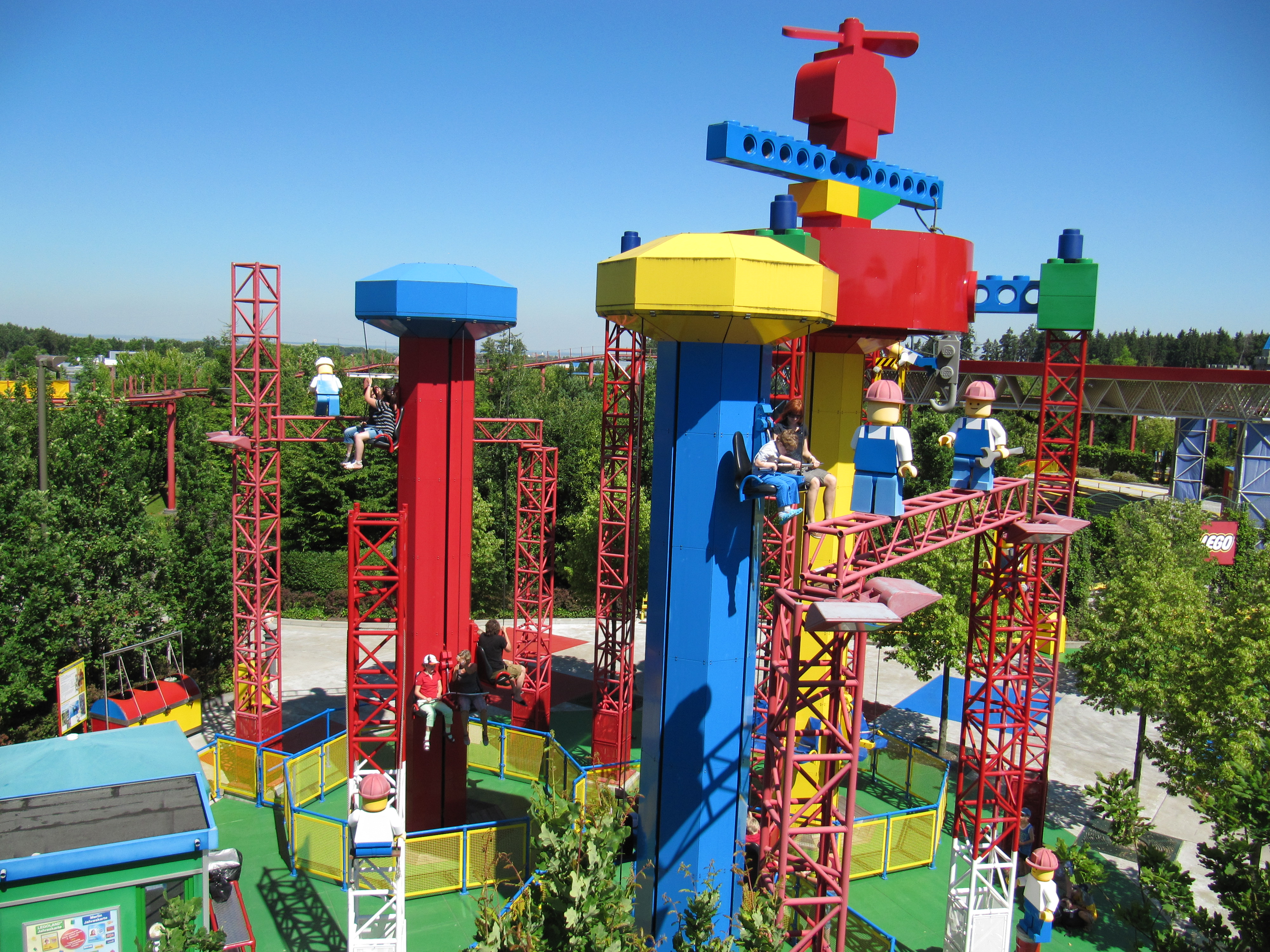
Kids Power Tower (2010)

- Pedal-A-Car (Tret-O-Mobil): Riders have to pedal a vehicle around a track.
- Duplo Express: A train ride made specifically for younger children.
- Duplo Playground (DUPLO Spielplatz): A playground for younger children.
- Duplo Splash Area: A splash pad for younger children.
- Lego City Police Station Maze (LEGO CITY Polizeistation): Maze with special effects.
- Observation Tower (Aussichtsturm): A 50 meter high rotating tower giving riders a view over Legoland Deutschland.
- Kids Power Tower: An attraction where riders have to pull their way up to the top of the tower using a rope and their own strength.
- Gallery of Football Stars (Gallerie der Fußballstars): A gallery of football stars made out of Lego.

==== Kingdom of the Pharaohs/Land der Pharaonen ====
- Temple X-pedition (Tempel X-pedition): Riders ride on a Jeep vehicle and go on an interactive treasure hunt.
- Pyramid Rallye (Pyramiden Rallye): Competitive team attraction where groups propel a hand pumped truck in a race down a street to douse a simulated building "fire" and return the truck.
- Desert X-cursion (Wüsten X-kursion): Balloon ride.
- Holiday Village Entrance/Exit

==== Adventure Land/Land der Abenteuer ====
- Jungle X-pedition (Dschungel X-pedition): A log ride for guests of all ages ending in a 12-meter drop over a waterfall.
- Canoe X-pedition (Kanu X-pedition): Younger children can ride a small canoe around a track of water.
- Safari Tour: Riders ride on a track and take a tour of 90 Lego created animal displays.
- Adventure Playground (Abenteuer Spielplatz): Built out of wood and offers obstacles for children to climb, crawl and swing from.

==== Pirate Land/Land der Piraten ====
- Captain Nick's Splash Battle (Käpt'n Nicks Piratenschlacht): A boat ride where riders have to shoot various targets using a water gun.
- Pirates School (Piratenschule): A swinging Pirate ship ride.
- Pirates’ Playground (Piratenspielplatz): A climbing obstacle course designed for younger children.

==== Lego X-treme ====
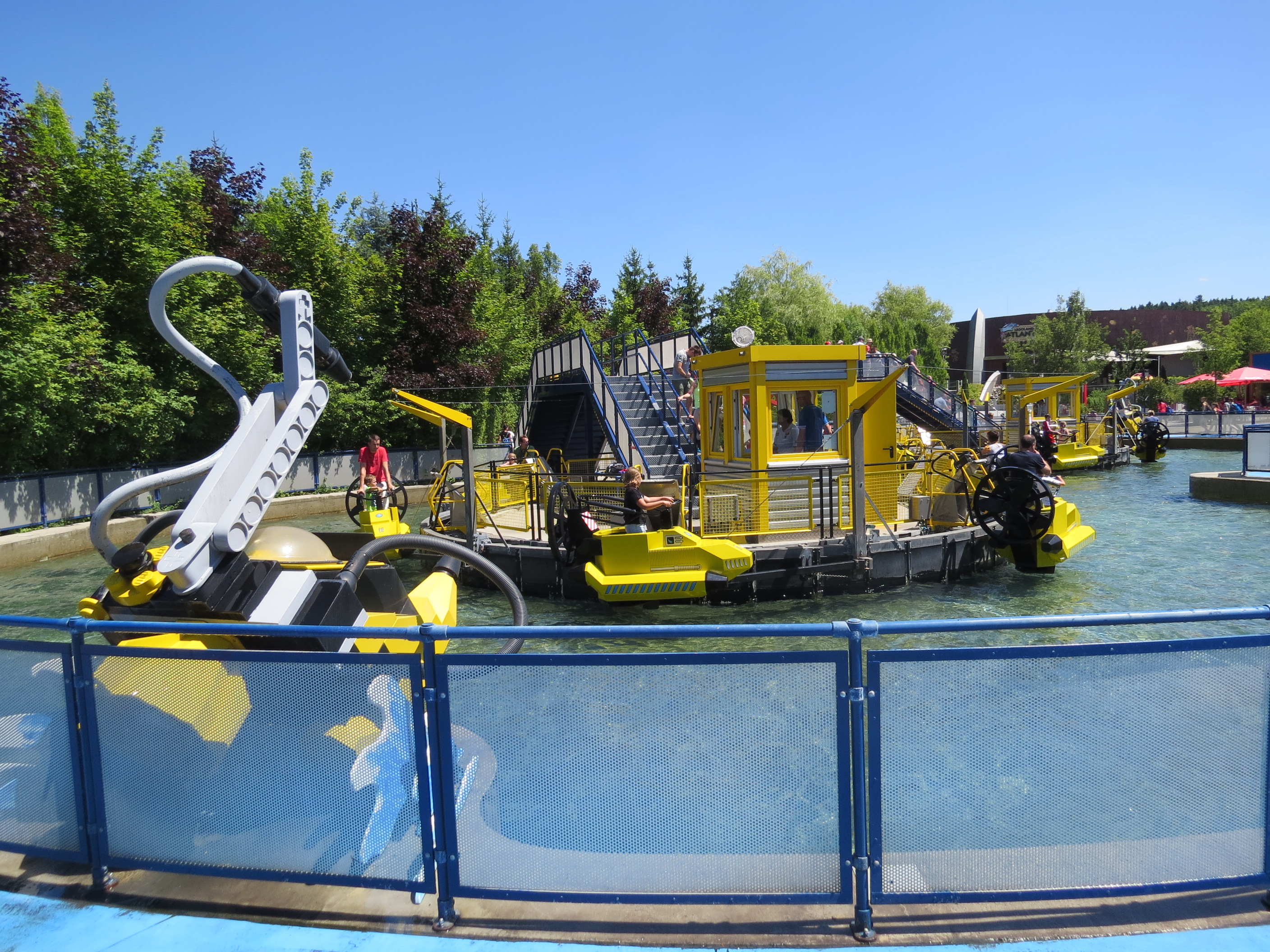
Wave Racers (2017)

- Legoland Atlantis by Sea Life: Indoor aquarium containing over 2,000 fish and a million Lego bricks.
- Stepping Tones: A fountain decorated with musical instruments made out of Lego bricks.
- Water Works (Wasserspielplatz): Splash pad with jets of water shooting from the ground.
- Wave Racers (Wellenreiter): Riders ride on a vehicle going over waves and jets of water.
- The Great Lego Race (Das Große LEGO Rennen): An 18 meter high wild mouse roller coaster.
- Lego Mindstorms Center (LEGO Akademie): An educational workshop using Lego. This attraction has an additional fee.
- Techno Tea Cup (Techno Schleuder): A Teacups ride designed to look like it was made out of Lego.
- Drive Your Monster Truck: Guests can steer a remote controlled monster truck around an obstacle course. This attraction has an additional fee.

==== Lego Ninjago World ====
- Lego Ninjago The Ride: Interactive 4-D Ride
- Lloyd's Spinjittzu Spinner: Heege Loopster

==== Lego Mythica ====
- Maximus - The Guardian's Flight
- Fire & Ice Tower
- Lavaland Playground

== Legoland Holiday Village ==
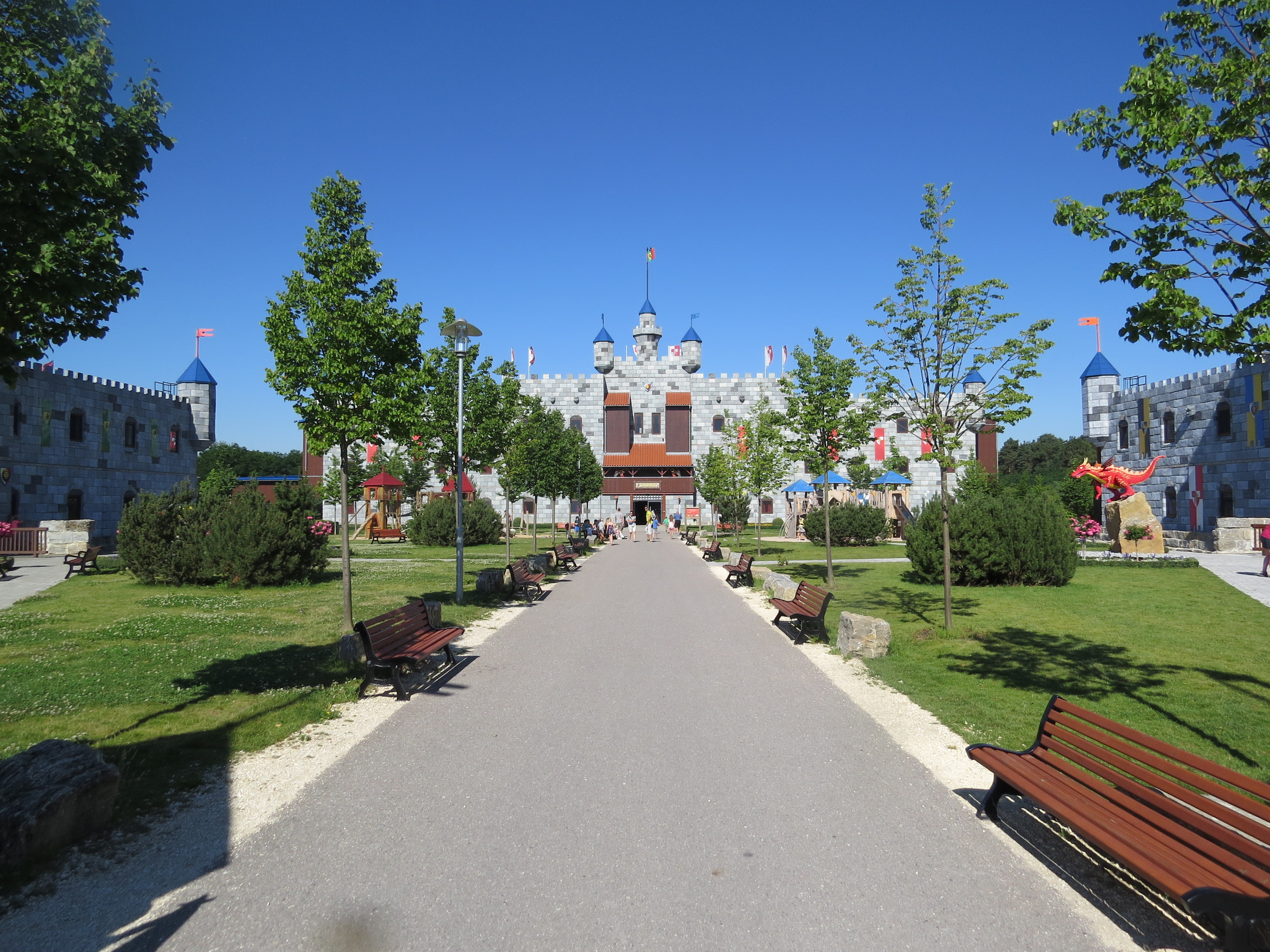
Legoland Holiday Village Castle area

In 2008, Legoland opened the first ever Legoland Holiday Village directly across from the Legoland Deutschland theme park. Holiday Village is an 11-hectare village with 72 holiday houses, 4 hotels, 39 camping barrels and a campsite.

=== Accommodations ===
Legoland Deutschland Resort offers the following accommodations at Legoland Holiday Village:

- Pirate Island Hotel (142 rooms)
- Castles
  - King's Castle (68 rooms)
  - Dragon's Castle (34 rooms)
  - Knight's Castle (34 rooms)
- Themed Houses (72 rooms)
- Camping Barrels (39 rooms)
- Campsite
- Ninjago Quarter (72 rooms)

=== Restaurants & Shopping ===
- Pirates Tavern Restaurant & Smugglers' Bar (Family-Style dinner)
- The Round Table Restaurant & King's Tavern
- Jungle Buffet Restaurant (all you can eat buffet)
- Steak House Restaurant
- Holiday Village Shop (Lego shop)

=== Attractions ===
- Pirate Golf (12 hole miniature golf course)
- Bowling Center
- High Ropes Course (six different courses with 41 components)
- Themed Playgrounds
- Hot Air Balloon ride

== Awards ==
In 2011 and 2012, Legoland Deutschland won the Parkscout Award of "Germany's Most Child-Friendly Theme Park". In 2012/2013, Legoland Deutschland won another Parkscout Award for the "Best Family Amusement park". Additionally in 2013, Legoland Deutschland received the Tripadvisor Travellers' Choice 2013 Award.

== Incidents ==
On August 11, 2022, two trains from the Fire Dragon ride collided. Of the 38 people aboard the trains, 31 received minor injuries with 14 of those requiring hospitalisation and one requiring further treatment. The accident was caused by the first train becoming stationary on the track. A sensor then warned the ride technicians and prevented the second train from continuing through the layout. The ride technicians then overrode the sensor allowing the second train to progress throughout the layout. The technicians in question were then made to pay a fine said to be "a mid or low four-digit amount”.

== See also ==
- Lost Kingdom Adventure
