= Pirate Cove =

Pirate Cove, Pirates Cove, Pirate's Cove, Pirates' Cove, or variation, may refer to:

- a cove used as a base by pirates

== Places ==
=== United States ===
- Pirates Cove, a bay and a clothing-optional beach in San Luis Obispo County, California
- Pirates Cove, Florida, an unincorporated community on Sugarloaf Key
- Pirates Cove Waterpark, a water park in Arapahoe County, Colorado
- Pirate's Cove Waterpark at Pohick Bay, in Virginia
- Pirate Cove, an area developed as a fish station on Popof Island, Alaska

=== Elsewhere ===
- Pirates Cove Marine Provincial Park, British Columbia, Canada
- Pirates' Cove, a zone at Chessington World of Adventures amusement park in London, England, UK

== Games ==
- Tropico 2: Pirate Cove, a 2003 video game
- Pirate Cove (video game), a 1978 video game
- Pirate's Cove, a 2002 board game
- Pirate Cove, a fictional local in the Freddy Fazbear's Pizza in Five Nights at Freddy's

== See also ==
- Pirates of Black Cove, a 2011 RTS game
- Pirate (disambiguation)
- Cove (disambiguation)
