= Dark ride =

Type of amusement ride

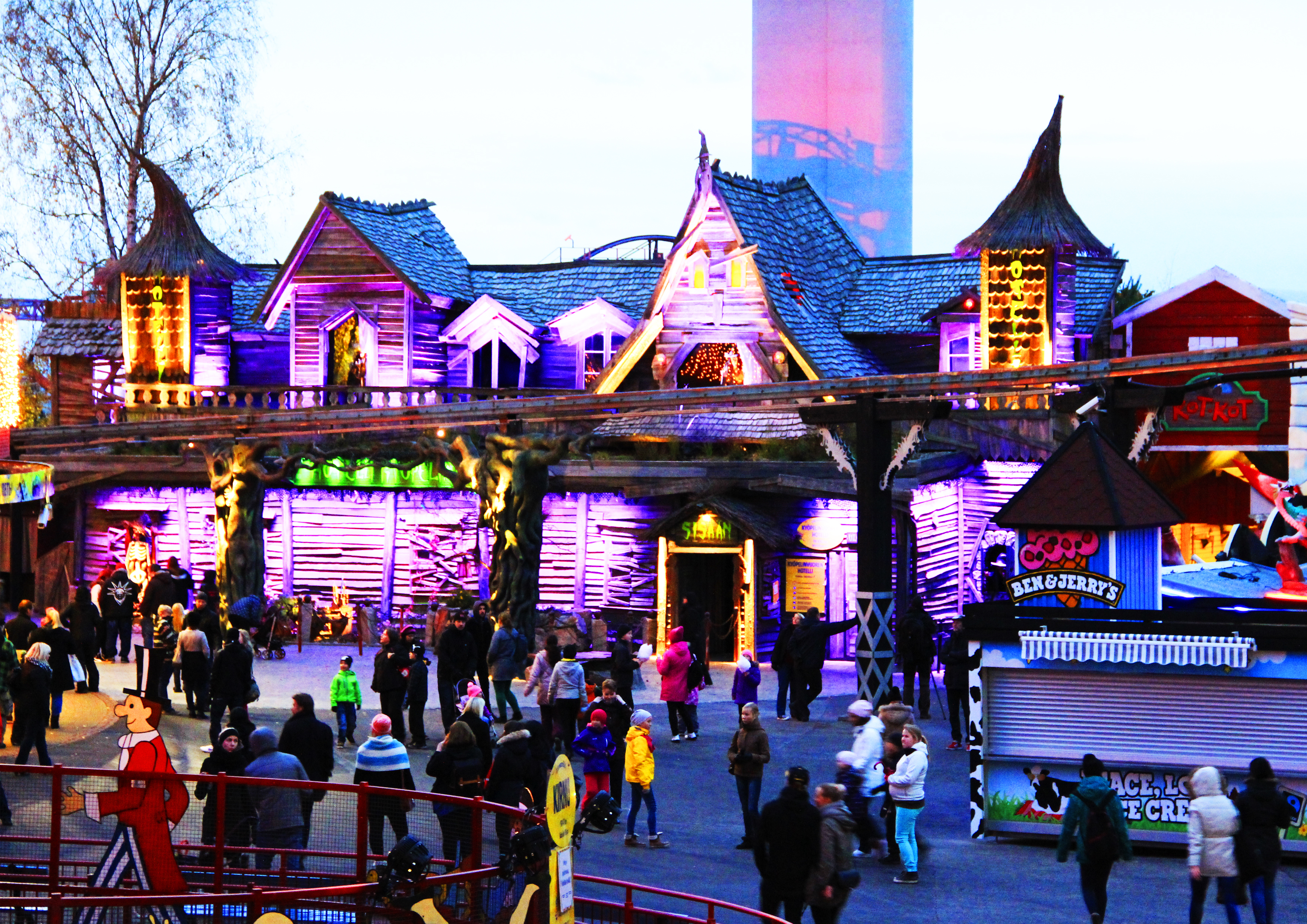
Kyöpelinvuoren hotelli (literally "Hotel of the Phantom Mountain"), a dark ride at the Linnanmäki amusement park in Helsinki, Finland

A dark ride—or ghost train when horror themed—is an indoor amusement ride on which passengers aboard guided vehicles travel through specially lit scenes that typically contain animation, sound, music and special effects. Appearing as early as the 19th century, such exhibits include tunnels of love, scary themes and interactive stories. Dark rides are intended to tell stories, with thematic elements that immerse riders, which unfold throughout the course of the attraction.

== Terminology ==
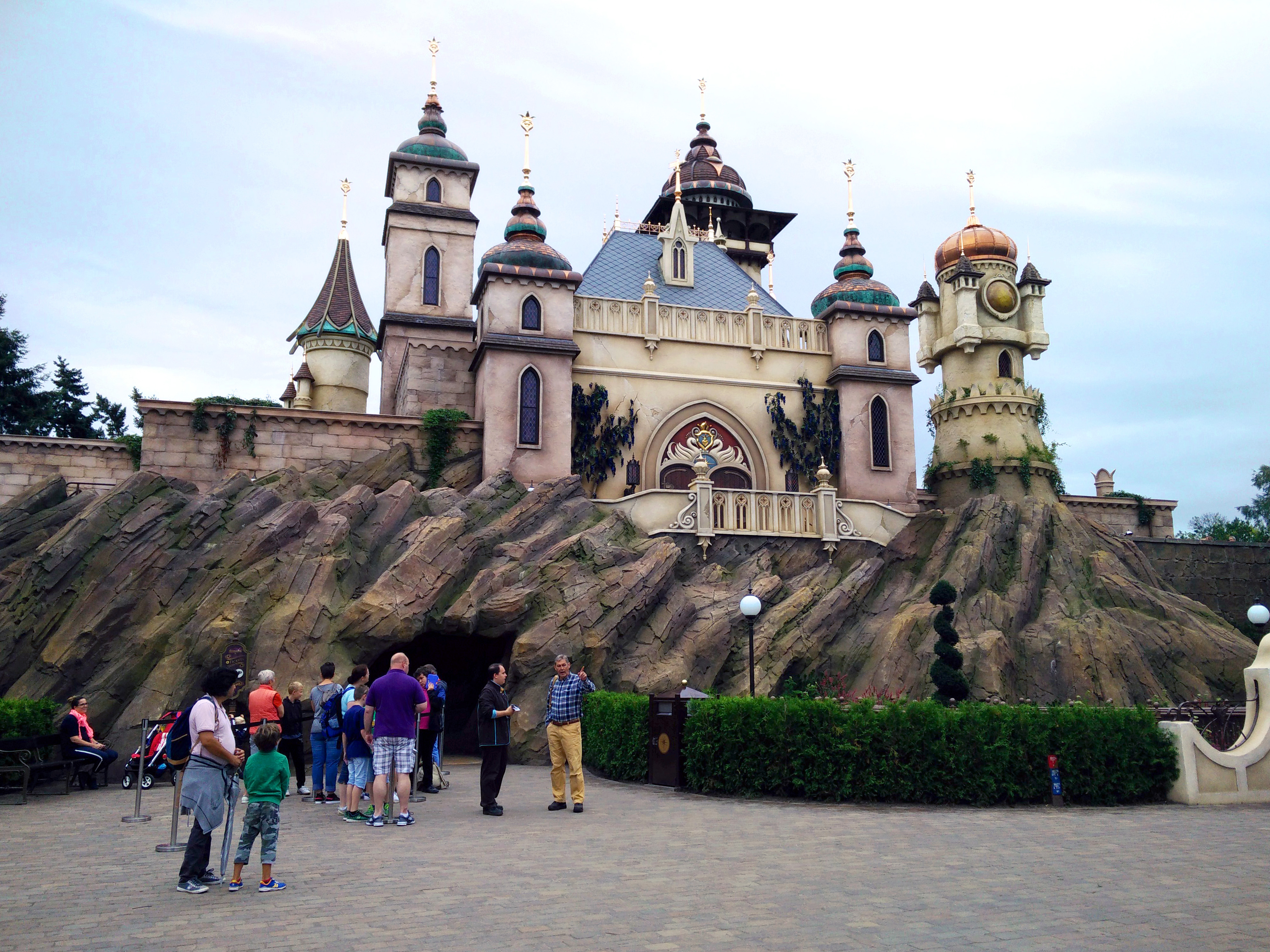
Symbolica is the most expensive attraction in the largest amusement park in the Netherlands, Efteling

In its most traditional form, the term dark ride refers to ride-through attractions with scenes that use black lights, whereby visible light is prevented from entering the space, and only show elements that fluoresce under ultraviolet radiation are seen by the riders. The size of each room containing a scene or scenes is thus concealed, and the set designer can use forced perspective, Pepper's ghost and other visual tricks to create the illusion of distance. Typically, these experiences also use a series of opaque doors between scenes to further control riders' views within a space-constrained building. Prominent examples include Disneyland's Snow White's Scary Adventures, Pinocchio's Daring Journey, Peter Pan's Flight, Mr. Toad's Wild Ride and Alice in Wonderland, which all rely on the use of blacklights in almost every scene.

== History ==
The first dark rides appeared in the late 19th century and were called "scenic railways" and "pleasure railways". A popular type of dark ride commonly referred to as an old mill or tunnel of love used small boats to carry riders through water-filled canals. A Trip to the Moon began operation at the 1901 Pan-American Exposition. Marvin Rempfer and Leon Cassidy of the Pretzel Amusement Ride Company patented the first single-rail electric dark ride in 1928. Historically notable dark rides include Futurama at the 1939 New York World's Fair, and Pirates of the Caribbean and The Haunted Mansion at Disneyland.

Modern attractions in this genre vary widely in technical sophistication. Smaller-scale rides often feature the same sorts of simple animation and sounds used since the genre's early days, while more ambitious projects feature complex animatronics, special effects and ride vehicles utilizing cutting-edge technology.

To improve the effect and give a sense of journey, passages in dark rides frequently change direction. Sudden curves give a sense of disorientation and allow new scenes to surprise the rider. The rides may also feature sudden ascents or descents to further the excitement.

== Empirical research ==
Although ever increasing investments are made in dark rides, empirical research in this area is relatively scarce. Based on a systematic literature review, a team of researchers from the University of Liechtenstein developed a model that illustrates the underlying effect mechanism that attendees of Dark Rides experience. The model suggests that "Storytelling" in Dark Rides influences an attendee's "emotional attachment" to the ride through the mediator of "Immersion". It is assumed that a person's prior knowledge about the ride's story and a person's cultural background have moderating effects on the relationship between "storytelling" and "immersion".

== Variations ==
Dark rides have a number of variations that are not necessarily mutually exclusive.

=== Ghost train ===
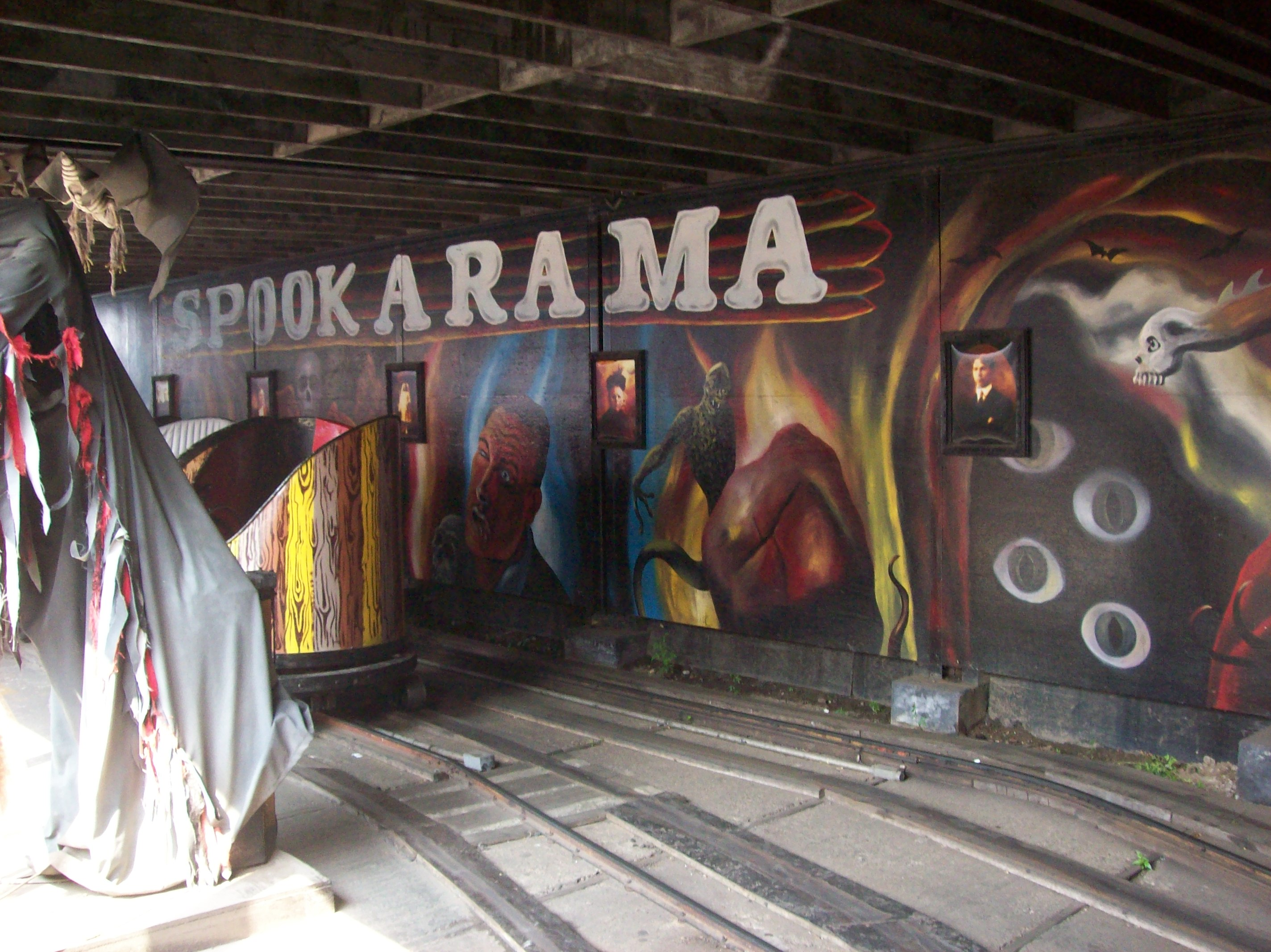
A ghost train ride

In the United Kingdom, Ireland, New Zealand, China and Australia, dark rides with a scary theme are called ghost trains.

The first ride to use the name "Ghost Train" was that of Blackpool Pleasure Beach. The ride was imported in 1930 and originally called The Pretzel (due to the curving shape of its track layout); but as pretzels were little-known in Britain, it was soon renamed after The Ghost Train, a play which ran for a year in London, a film adaptation of which was showing in 1931. It was rebuilt in 1936 and has remained unchanged since. Blackpool Pleasure Beach is also home to Valhalla, a large indoor dark ride.

In Australia, a dark ride is named The Ghost Train at Luna Park, Melbourne, and a similarly named ride was destroyed by fire in 1979 at Luna Park Sydney.

The concept is also popular in the United States. One notable ghost train from the country is The Haunted Mansion, first opened in Disneyland in Anaheim, California, on August 9, 1969.

=== Interactive dark ride ===
Interactive dark rides feature a component that allows riders to be involved in the attraction's story. The first interactive dark ride ever built is El Paso at the Belgium theme park Bobbejaanland.

The vast majority of interactive dark rides are shooting dark rides, which require riders to aim and shoot at targets throughout the ride using handheld or vehicle-mounted light guns. Successfully shooting a target usually triggers special animation, such as flashing lights or moving the target. The more targets riders hit, the higher their scores at the end of the ride. The use of light guns varies between rides, from killing aliens on Men in Black: Alien Attack at Universal Studios Florida to calling turkeys on Gobbler Getaway at Holiday World & Splashin' Safari. The ride systems of conventional dark rides can be easily converted into shooting dark rides. Such conversions include Duel: The Haunted House Strikes Back! at Alton Towers (until 2023 when the ride was altered) and Buzz Lightyear's Space Ranger Spin at Disney's Magic Kingdom. The latter uses facilities that previously housed If You Had Wings, Delta Dreamflight, and Take Flight. A recent dark ride, Wonder Mountain's Guardian at Canada's Wonderland, has the world's longest interactive screen at over 500 feet (150 m).

Among non-shooting interactive dark rides, Etnaland's award-winning Haunted School is described by Park World magazine as "one of the most idiosyncratic dark rides". It is themed to a school exam, with riders individually answering multiple-choice questions throughout it. Riders are graded on their responses, and each receives a school report at the end of the ride. While technically a coaster, the Gekion Live coaster at Joypolis had elements of a dark ride. It used to have a shooting element, only for it to be refurbished with a dance element (tapping buttons on the restraints) later.

=== Trackless dark ride ===
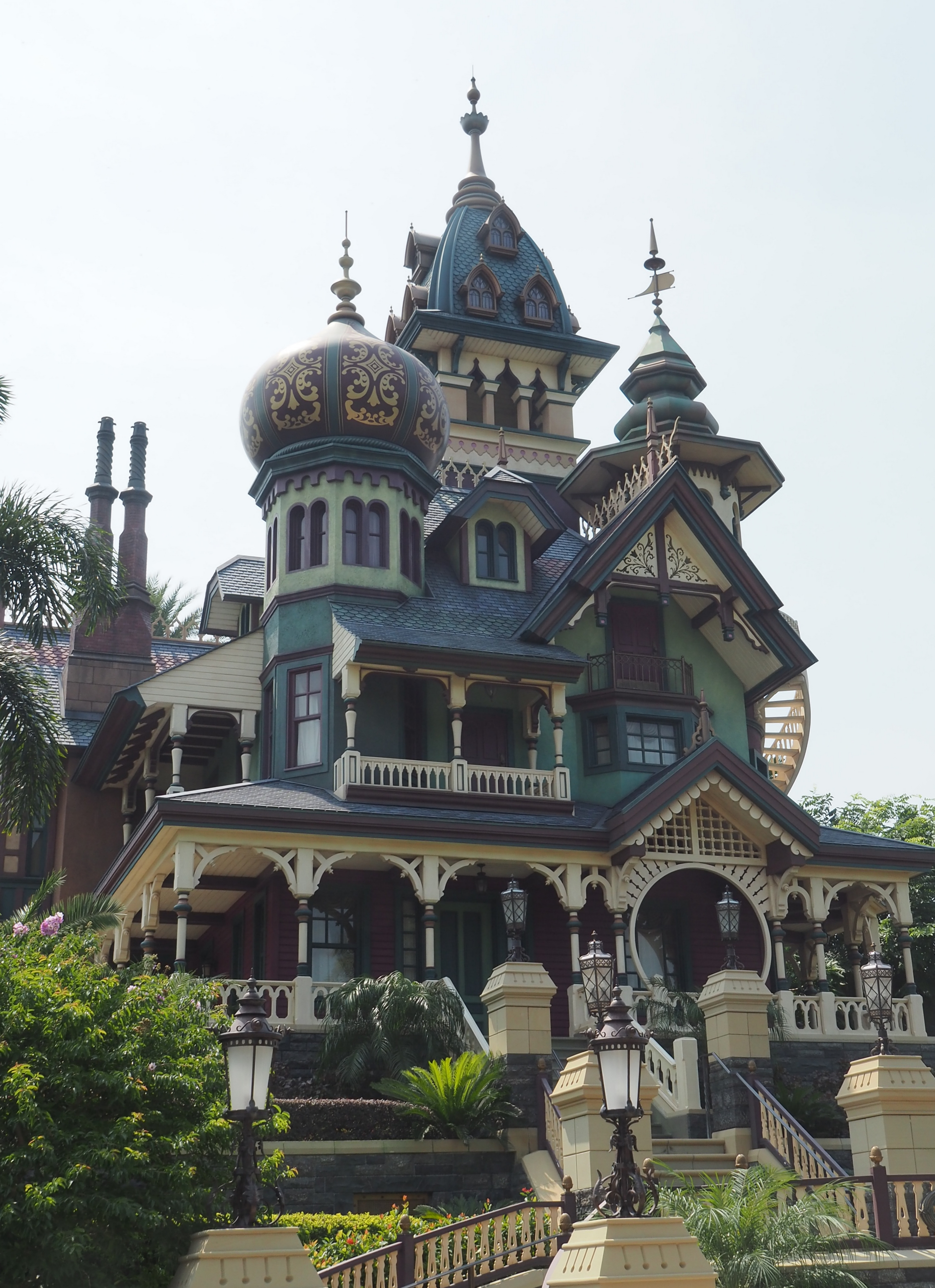
Mystic Manor at Hong Kong Disneyland

The Walt Disney Company is the first to develop a trackless ride system for its dark ride attractions. Trackless dark rides utilize automated guided vehicles that do not require guide rails, and thus are able to cross existing paths, reverse, and rotate. Some trackless dark rides, such as the Big Red Car Ride at Dreamworld, relied on a buried wire for navigation. Others, such as Star Wars: Rise of the Resistance at Disney's Hollywood Studios and Disneyland Park, Mystic Manor at Hong Kong Disneyland or Ratatouille: L'Aventure Totalement Toquée de Rémy at Disneyland Paris and Epcot, use Wi-Fi and RFID-based local positioning systems. The system provides more versatility for the vehicles to move in randomized patterns. The magnets in the attractions' floor keep the vehicles "on track" with a guiding master computer system telling the vehicles where to go. The earliest form of this technology existed in warehouses, where electric box lifts robotically moved across the floor to transport boxes. In addition, the technology has been used in autonomous vacuum robots that rely on motion sensors to freely roam the floor since 1996. The trackless dark ride system as it is known today, debuted in 2000 at Tokyo Disneyland's "Pooh's Hunny Hunt" attraction– a dark ride based on Disney's 1977 hit animated feature film The Many Adventures of Winnie the Pooh. However, while Pooh's Hunny Hunt pioneered the trackless ride system, it was Hollywood Studio's Tower of Terror and Epcot's Universe of Energy attractions that first utilized the technology.

The use of virtual reality in the development of trackless technology is often overlooked. The Disney VR Studio, founded in 1992, allowed the exploration of virtual reality technology for theme park rides. Before its role in the development of the trackless system, the VR Studio used virtual prototypes to model attractions such as California Screamin' at Disney's California Adventure Park. Disney has used virtual simulations to allow designers to experience roller coasters before they are built and as a means of previewing complex new ride vehicles such as the free-ranging vehicles used in "Pooh's Hunny Hunt". Moreover, this computer visualization is a powerful tool for transcending language barriers. Showing a virtual prototype of "Pooh's Hunny Hunt" to Japan was a cause of the implementation of the ride at Tokyo Disneyland due to its use of imaging over speech.

==== Social barriers ====
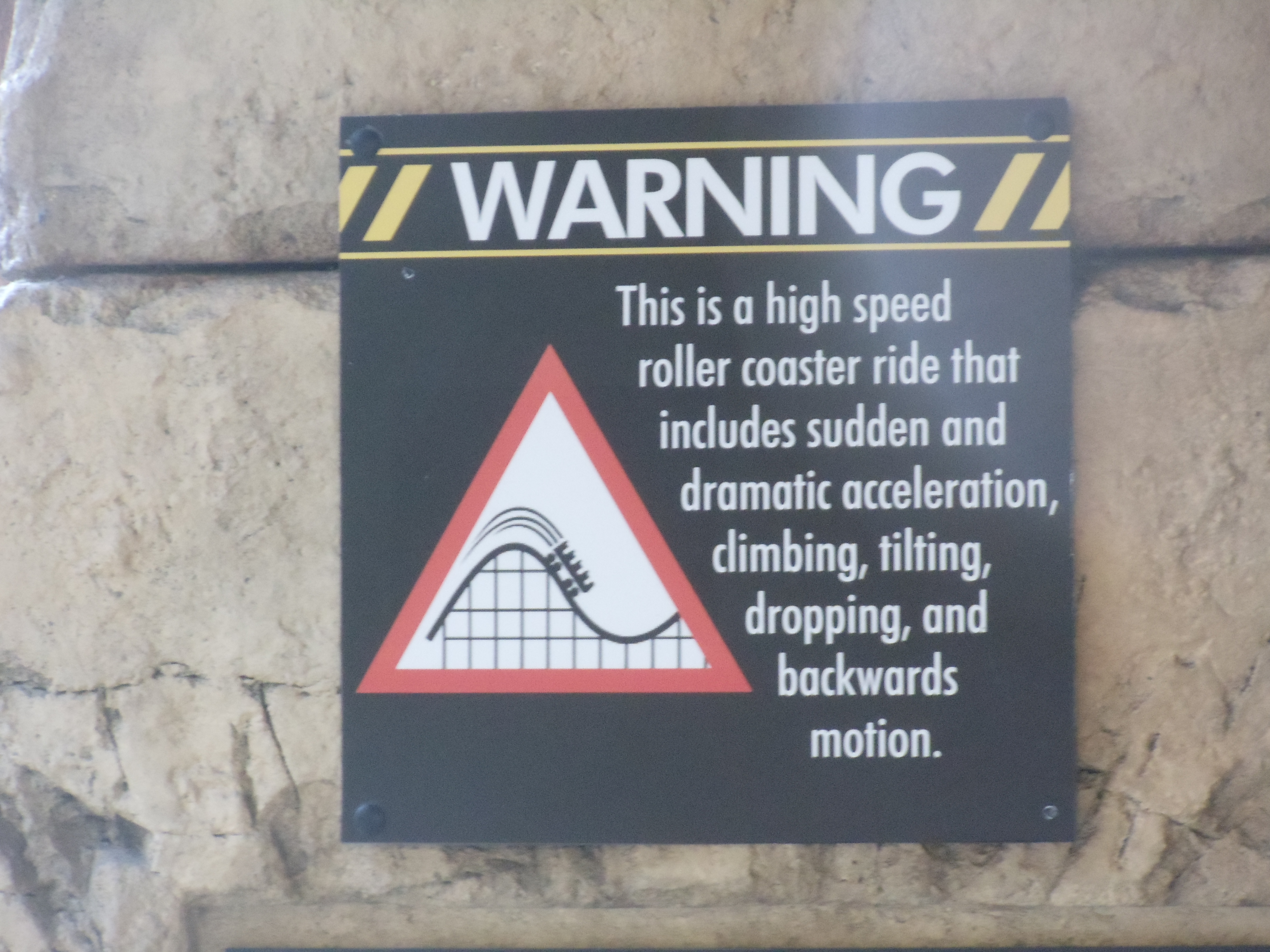
The Mummy ride warning sign at Universal Studios

Some dark rides are intense for riders, as they contain vigorous themed elements such as flashing lights, black light effects, sudden drops, stoppages, or other turbulent movements that may be harmful to impaired riders. As more thrill rides are created, the number of attractions that limit riders with disabilities increases. Most commonly, guests who are prohibited from riding are those who are too overweight for the ride vehicle to safely hold the guest's weight or prevent the safety harness from locking in place. Other ride restrictions include those who do not meet a certain height requirement or are too tall to clear the attractions' set pieces, or those who lack a certain number of arms and legs. Ride requirements are created to ensure all guests' safety throughout the ride and are posted throughout the attractions' queue to prevent the companies' liability if a rider is physically harmed. However, according to Title III of the Americans Disability Act it is illegal for amusement parks to discriminate against any persons with disabilities from equal enjoyment of goods of services in a public place of accommodation. Therefore, companies such as The Walt Disney Company are required by law to accommodate any person with a physical disability who still meets the ride requirements. This often includes guests who use wheelchairs or crutches.

Services such as the Disability Access Service (DAS) at Disney theme parks instates equality between disabled and non-disabled riders in its theme parks and resorts, making these attractions largely accessible for its guests. Companies such as Universal Studios offer similar services such as the Attractions Assistance Pass (AAS). The DAS pass allows guests to reserve a spot in an attraction's line, select a time to board the attraction, and return at their scheduled time. This allows guests who cannot physically wait in a trackless dark ride queue to still ride without being present at the queue, but still wait the same amount of time as other abled guests. Many trackless dark ride queues are tight, enclosed spaces for guests to wind through, which are often difficult for people with wheelchairs or aids to navigate.

Moreover, as the trackless ride systems are complex and the vehicles run constantly, more ride breakdowns and stoppages occur. Due to the many elements of these attractions, breakdowns occur more frequently and take more time to address. Hollywood Studio's Star Wars: Rise of the Resistance had more than 540 unplanned stoppages in 2022, breaking down more than any other attraction at Walt Disney World that year. This can be frustrating for guests as trackless rides are some of the most popular, yet break down the most often. Trackless dark rides often have some of the longest wait times at theme parks. Wait time data from Walt Disney World in 2022 shows that Star Wars: Rise of the Resistance has an average wait time of 127 minutes at Disney's Hollywood Studios park, whereas the average wait time for other Disney World, non-trackless attractions is just 36 minutes. Long wait times coupled with frequent ride stoppages can be vexing for guests, but may be well worth it to those who prefer trackless dark rides to other experiences.

=== Enclosed roller coaster ===
While some roller coasters may be indoors, simply enclosing a roller coaster does not make it a dark ride. Dark coasters are roller coasters that feature heavily themed layouts, special effects (such as animated characters, fire, smoke, and sound/lighting effects), and a dark ride portion that abruptly transitions into a roller coaster-style layout with heavily banked turns, sharp turns, steep drops, and helices. Some of them include backward motion, and many have launch mechanisms rather than lifts. Examples include:

- Flight of Fear at Kings Island and Kings Dominion
- Blazing Fury at Dollywood
- Revenge of the Mummy at many of the Universal Destinations & Experiences (themed to The Mummy film franchise, featuring a launch from the dark ride section into the coaster section)
- Seven Dwarfs Mine Train at the Magic Kingdom and Shanghai Disneyland
- Scooby-Doo Spooky Coaster at Warner Bros. Movie World (a wild mouse roller coaster with a ghost-train section, vertical lift and backwards drop)
- Space Mountain at Disney World, Disneyland Park, Magic Kingdom, Tokyo Disneyland, and Hong Kong Disneyland
- Star Wars Hyperspace Mountain at Disneyland Park (Paris)
- Verbolten at Busch Gardens Williamsburg (themed to an escape from the haunted Bavarian Black Forest, with a free-fall track section)
- Guardians of the Galaxy: Cosmic Rewind at EPCOT

Test Track at Epcot, Journey to the Center of the Earth at Tokyo DisneySea, and Radiator Springs Racers at Disney California Adventure each use a slot car track rather than that of a roller coaster, but they provide a similar pairing of dark ride scenes with a high-speed thrill ride.

Saw – The Ride at Thorpe Park features an enclosed dark section with strobe lighting and special effects, before the car enters the outdoor section of the ride.

=== Other attractions incorporating dark ride elements ===
Particularly in Disney-built or -influenced parks, a number of attractions use traditional dark-ride features, such as animatronics and theatrical lighting, but are not "dark rides" in that patrons do not board vehicles. Examples include the walk-through dioramas in Disneyland's Sleeping Beauty Castle, and theater-based Disney attractions like Great Moments with Mr. Lincoln, The Hall of Presidents, The American Adventure and Walt Disney's Enchanted Tiki Room. Walt Disney's Carousel of Progress (and its now-closed Disneyland replacement America Sings) had four auditoriums that rotated audiences around a stationary core with show scenes.

The Tomorrowland Transit Authority PeopleMover in the Magic Kingdom at Walt Disney World and the Disneyland Railroad both include brief dark-ride scenes, but for the most part transport guests outdoors. Expedition Everest at Disney's Animal Kingdom, Matterhorn Bobsleds at Disneyland, Big Thunder Mountain Railroad and Space Mountain at several Disney parks, and Big Grizzly Mountain Runaway Mine Cars at Hong Kong Disneyland likewise include some dark-ride elements, but function primarily as indoor/outdoor roller coasters.

Eatrenalin in Europa-Park is an attraction that combines dark ride elements, such as trackless ride vehicles and themed rooms, with a fine dining experience.

== List of dark rides ==
- Name in italics means that it has been closed; date of closure follows "−".

Title	Open	Location	Notes
Op Reis Met Bumba	2023	Plopsaland De Panne	
20,000 Leagues Under the Sea: Submarine Voyage	1971−1994; 2001	Magic Kingdom; Tokyo DisneySea	
Adventure Thru Inner Space	1967−1985	Disneyland	Replaced in 1985 by Star Tours
Alice in Wonderland	1961	Blackpool Pleasure Beach	
Alice in Wonderland	1958	Disneyland	
The Amazing Adventures of Spider-Man	1999 2004-2024	Universal Islands of Adventure Universal Studios Japan	Refurbished with new 3-D scenes and effects in 2012; USJ version closed in 2024 due to license termination
Animal Crisis	2014	Quancheng Euro Park	
Apiland	2000	Parc du Bocasse	
Apirama	1979−1999	Meli Park	8-min. water dark ride with one drop; Transformed by new owner into Het Bos van Plop (Plopsaland)
Atlantis Adventure	2007	Europa-Park	
Antarctica: Empire of the Penguin	2013-2020	SeaWorld Orlando	A first-of-its-kind motion-based trackless dark ride developed by Oceaneering International
Bermuda Triangle	1994−2010	Sea World	Replaced by Storm Coaster
Big Red Car Ride	2005-2020	Dreamworld	
Blå Tåget	1935	Gröna Lund	Renovated 2011
Boo Blasters on Boo Hill	2010; 2010-2025	Canada's Wonderland; Carowinds; Kings Island; Kings Dominion	Formerly a Scooby-Doo-themed ride, rebranded after the parks did not renew the licence
Bubbleworks	1990−2016	Chessington World of Adventures	Water dark ride, originally Prof. Burp's Bubble Works, later called Imperial Leather Bubbleworks. Replaced in 2016 by the Gruffalo River Ride Adventure.
Buzz Lightyear Astro Blasters	2005; 2005−2017	Disneyland; Hong Kong Disneyland	Hong Kong Disneyland version closed to make way for Ant-Man and The Wasp: Nano Battle!
Buzz Lightyear's Astro Blasters	2004	Tokyo Disneyland	
Buzz Lightyear Laser Blast	2006	Disneyland Park (Disneyland Paris)	
Buzz Lightyear Planet Rescue	2016	Shanghai Disneyland Park	
Buzz Lightyear's Space Ranger Spin	1998	Magic Kingdom	
Calico Mine Ride	1960	Knott's Berry Farm	
Capitán Balas	2007	Isla Mágica	
Carnaval Festival	1984	Efteling	
Castillo del Terror		Tivoli World	
Cave Train	1961	Santa Cruz Beach Boardwalk	
Challenge of Mondor	2008	Enchanted Forest	
Challenge of Tutankhamon	2001	Walibi Belgium	
Charlie and the Chocolate Factory: The Ride	2006−2015	Alton Towers	Formerly Around The World In 80 Days (1981-1993), then Toyland Tours (1994-2005). Currently closed
Chocolate Tour at Hershey's Chocolate World	1973	Hersheypark	
Crush's Coaster	2007	Walt Disney Studios Park	This attraction is also a roller coaster
Cueva de las Tarántulas	2006	Parque de Atracciones de Madrid	Replacing The Old Mine 1910
Cueva del Horror		Parque de Atracciones de Zaragoza	
The Curse at Alton Manor	1992	Alton Towers	Formerly The Haunted House (1992-2003), then Duel - The Haunted House Strikes Back (2003-2023). Refurbished again in 2023 to The Curse at Alton Manor.
Curse of DarKastle	2005−2017	Busch Gardens Williamsburg	
DASA-Drom		DASA (German work safety exhibition)	This is a dark ride which is part of the exhibition of a museum.
Den Flyvende Kuffert	1993	Tivoli Gardens	
The Den of Lost Thieves	1998	Indiana Beach	Previously opened in 1969 as the Mystery Mansion
Derren Brown's Ghost Train	2016; 2023	Thorpe Park	An attraction that incorporates virtual reality headsets and motion simulation. Reopened in 2023 as Ghost Train.
Devil's Den	1968	Conneaut Lake Park	Haunted house-style dark ride with illusions, stunts, and spooky murals. One of only five Pretzel rides still operating.
Dinolandia		Tivoli World	
Dinosaur	1998-2026	Disney's Animal Kingdom	
Dracula's Castle	1974	Lagoon Amusement Park	Refurbished with new scenes in 2007; featured in episode 27 ("Blind Luck") of the 1987-88 television series Werewolf
Dream River	2019	Parque de Atracciones de Zaragoza	Formerly Río Misterioso
Droomvlucht	1993	Efteling	
Dwarf City	1975	Europa-Park	
Eatrenalin	2022	Europa-Park	Hybrid dark ride and restaurant.
El Rescate de Ulises	2001	Terra Mítica	Boat ride. The longest dark ride in Europe
El Laberinto del Minotauro	2000	Terra Mítica	
El Rescate de Ulises	2001	Terra Mítica	Boat ride. The longest dark ride in Europe
El Rio del Tiempo	1982−2007	Epcot	Changed to Gran Fiesta Tour Starring The Three Caballeros
El Último Minuto	2006	Dinópolis	
Elf Ride	1979	Europa-Park	
Escape from Pompeii	1996	Busch Gardens Williamsburg	
E.T. Adventure	1990; 1991−2003; 2001−2009	Universal Studios Florida; Universal Studios Hollywood; Universal Studios Japan	
Fantasía	1999−2016	Parque de Atracciones de Madrid	
Fata Morgana	1986	Efteling	
Finding Nemo Submarine Voyage	2007	Disneyland	Re-theming of the Submarine Voyage
Fire in the Hole	1972	Silver Dollar City	The original Fire in the Hole is closing permanently at the end of 2023. A new Fire in the Hole will debut at the park in 2024.
Flying Witch	2025	Niagara Amusement Park & Splash World	A multi-story tracked dark ride through haunted house scenes with old-school props and scene displays. It previously ran at Playland from 1971 to 2021.
Frozen Ever After	2016	Epcot	Replaced Maelstrom
Ghost Train	1930	Blackpool Pleasure Beach	
Ghostwood Estate	2008	Kennywood	
Gobbler Getaway	2006	Holiday World	
Gran Fiesta Tour Starring The Three Caballeros	2007	Epcot	Formerly El Rio del Tiempo dark ride (1982)
The Great Movie Ride	1989−2017	Disney's Hollywood Studios	
The Great Pistolero Roundup	1999	Family Kingdom Amusement Park	
Harry Potter and the Forbidden Journey	2010; 2014; 2016	Universal Islands of Adventure; Universal Studios Japan; Universal Studios Hollywood	
The Haunted Mansion	1969; 1971; 1983	Disneyland; Magic Kingdom; Tokyo Disneyland	
Haunted Mansion	1973	Knoebels Amusement Resort	
Het Bos van Plop	1999	Plopsaland	8-minute boat dark ride with one drop, on track of former Apirama
High Dive	1994	Wakayama Marina City | Porto Europa	Arrow Dynamics flume ride
I Corsari: la Vendetta del Fantasma	1992	Gardaland	Opened as I Corsari in 1992, in 2018 was renovated and changed the name
If You Had Wings	1972−1989	Magic Kingdom	
Indiana Jones Adventure: Temple of the Crystal Skull	2001	Tokyo DisneySea	
Indiana Jones Adventure: Temple of the Forbidden Eye	1995	Disneyland	
It's a Small World	1964; 1966; 1971; 1983; 1992; 2008	1964 New York World's Fair; Disneyland; Magic Kingdom; Tokyo Disneyland; Disneyland Park (Disneyland Paris); Hong Kong Disneyland	
Jocco's Mardi Gras Madness	2000−2005	Six Flags New Orleans	
Journey to Atlantis	1998; 2004; 2007	SeaWorld Orlando; SeaWorld San Diego	Refurbished in Orlando in 2017; elevator segment in San Diego version
Jumanji - The Adventure	2022	Gardaland	
Justice League: Alien Invasion 3D	2012	Warner Bros. Movie World	
Justice League: Battle for Metropolis	2015; 2015; 2016; 2017; 2017; 2017	Six Flags Over Texas; Six Flags St. Louis; Six Flags Great America; Six Flags Over Georgia; Six Flags Great Adventure; Six Flags Magic Mountain	Six Flags Over Texas installation replaced Adventure Theater; Six Flags St. Louis installation replaced Scooby-Doo! Ghostblasters: The Mystery of the Scary Swamp; Six Flags Great America installation replaced Southwest Amphitheater and was converted into a 2D interactive ride in the 2020s
Kärlekstunneln	1917	Gröna Lund	Refurbished in 1987
Kingdom of the Dinosaurs	1987−2004	Knott's Berry Farm	Replaced by Voyage to the Iron Reef
Knott's Bear-y Tales	1975−1987	Knott's Berry Farm	Replaced by Kingdom of the Dinosaurs, revived in 2021 as Knott's Bear-y Tales: Return to the Fair
Kong x Godzilla: The Ride	2026	Lotte World	
Kosmikar		Mount Igueldo Amusement Park	
Kyöpelinvuoren Hotelli	2013	Linnanmäki	
La Aventura de Scooby-Doo	2005	Parque Warner Madrid	
La Furia de los Dioses	1999−2010	Isla Mágica	
The Little Mermaid ~ Ariel's Undersea Adventure	2011; 2012	Disney California Adventure Park; Magic Kingdom	Magic Kingdom installation opened as "Under the Sea ~ Journey of the Little Mermaid".
Living with the Land	1982	Epcot	
Looney Tunes River Ride	1991−2011; 1996−2004	Warner Bros. Movie World; Warner Bros. Movie World Germany	
Los Piratas	1984−1996	Parque de Atracciones de Madrid	Replaced by The Old Mine 1910
Madame Freudenreich Curiosités	2018	Europa-Park	Replaced Universe of Energy, being a retheme of that ride
Maelstrom	1988−2014	Epcot	Closed for conversion to Frozen Ever After
Magical Powder	2002	Lagunasia	
The Many Adventures of Winnie the Pooh	1999; 2003; 2005	Magic Kingdom; Disneyland; Hong Kong Disneyland	Magic Kingdom installation replaced Mr. Toad's Wild Ride, Disneyland installation replaced Country Bear Jamboree
Monsters, Inc. Mike & Sulley to the Rescue!	2006-2026	Disney California Adventure Park	
Monsters, Inc. Ride & Go Seek	2009	Tokyo Disneyland	
Men in Black: Alien Attack	2000	Universal Studios Florida	
Mickey & Minnie's Runaway Railway	2020; 2022	Disney's Hollywood Studios; Disneyland	
The Mine of Lost Souls	1985	Canobie Lake Park	Refurbished in 1992 by the Sally Corporation
Minen	2003	Tivoli Gardens	
Monster Mansion	2009	Six Flags Over Georgia	Tales of the Okefenokee 1967-1980; Monster Plantation 1981-2009
Le Moulin de la Sorcière	1972−2004	La Ronde	
Mr. Toad's Wild Ride	1955; 1971−1998	Disneyland; Magic Kingdom	Magic Kingdom installation replaced by The Many Adventures of Winnie the Pooh
Mysterious River		Monte Igueldo Amusement Park	
Mystic Manor	2013	Hong Kong Disneyland	
Mystic Motel	2013	Ladera Ranch	Notable for being homemade, Mystic Motel contains a small walkthrough section as well as the 60-ft ride
The Old Mine 1910	1997−2004	Parque de Atracciones de Madrid	Replaced by Cueva de las Tarántulas
Peter Pan's Flight	1955; 1971; 1983; 1992; 2016	Disneyland; Magic Kingdom; Tokyo Disneyland; Disneyland Park (Disneyland Paris); Shanghai Disneyland Park	
Phantasmagoria	1973−2007	Bell's Amusement Park	Was one of the largest and longest haunted amusements in the country with a two-story track and 27 tricks and surprises, ride was demolished June 19, 2007 when Bell's Amusement Park was permanently closed
Phantom Fantasia	1983−2000	Thorpe Park	Later Wicked Witches Haunt; closed in 2000 by fire.
Phantom Manor	1992	Disneyland Park (Disneyland Paris)	
Phantom Theater	1972−2002	Kings Island	Replaced with Scooby-Doo's Haunted Mansion, then Boo Blasters on Boo Hill, and later Phantom Theater: Opening Nightmare
Piccolo Mondo	1982	Europa-Park	Before 2011 refurbishment was called Ciao Bambini
Pinocchio		Tivoli World	
Pinocchio's Daring Journey	1983; 1983; 1992	Tokyo Disneyland; Disneyland; Disneyland Park (Disneyland Paris)	
Pirates in Batavia	1987−2018	Europa-Park	Boat ride with one big drop
Pirate's Cove	1972	Waldameer & Water World	
Pirates of the Caribbean	1967; 1973; 1983; 1992	Disneyland; Magic Kingdom; Tokyo Disneyland; Disneyland Park (Disneyland Paris)	
Pooh's Hunny Hunt	2000	Tokyo Disneyland	
Popcorn Revenge	2019	Walibi Belgium	
Puppet Boat Ride	1992	Europa-Park	
Ratatouille: L'Aventure Totalement Toquée de Rémy	2014; 2020	Walt Disney Studios Park; Epcot	
Reese's Xtreme Cup Challenge	2006-2018	Hersheypark	
Río Misterioso	1978-2018	Parque de Atracciones de Zaragoza	Reopened as Dream River
River Caves	1905	Blackpool Pleasure Beach	
Rock 'n' Roller Coaster Starring Aerosmith	1999; 2002—2019	Disney's Hollywood Studios; Walt Disney Studios Park	This attraction is also a roller coaster. This attraction also existed at Walt Disney Studios Park, in Paris. The roller coaster closed for the construction of the new Marvel theme area Avengers Campus
Roger Rabbit's Car Toon Spin	1994; 1996	Disneyland; Tokyo Disneyland	
Scooby-Doo's Haunted Mansion	2000−2009; 2001−2009; 2002−2018; 2003−2014; 2004−2009; 2005−2009	Canada's Wonderland*; Carowinds*; Six Flags Fiesta Texas***; Six Flags St. Louis**; Kings Island*; Kings Dominion*	* indicates replaced by Boo Blasters on Boo Hill ** indicates replaced by Justice League: Battle for Metropolis *** indicates replaced by Pirates of the Deep Sea
Shootout at the Flooded Mine	1968	Silver Dollar City	
Sinbad's Storybook Voyage	2001	Tokyo DisneySea	
Snow White's Scary Adventures	1955; 1971−2012; 1983; 1992	Disneyland; Magic Kingdom; Tokyo Disneyland; Disneyland Park (Disneyland Paris)	Magic Kingdom installation replaced by Princess Fairytale Hall
Snowflake Sleigh Ride	1998	Europa-Park	
Spaceship Earth (Epcot)	1982	Epcot	
Spectacolo	2005	Wiener Prater	Free-fall dark ride
Splash Mountain	1989-2023; 1992-2023; 1992	Disneyland; Magic Kingdom; Tokyo Disneyland	
Star Wars: Rise of the Resistance	2019; 2020	Disney's Hollywood Studios; Disneyland	
Submarine Voyage	1959−1998	Disneyland	Reopened as Finding Nemo Submarine Voyage in 2007
The Swiss Chocolate Adventure	2014	Swiss Museum of Transport (Verkehrshaus), Lucerne	Covers an area of 700 square metres (7,500 sq ft)
Symbolica	2017	Efteling	Dark ride about Efteling's mascot, Pardoes; system delivered by Dutch company ETF, developed from cancelled project Hartenhof
Terroride	1967	Lagoon Amusement Park	Refurbished with all-new scenes and updated animatronics in 2017. Temporarily renamed Terroride: A Classic Reimagined for its 50th season operating.
Timber Mountain Log Ride	1969	Knott's Berry Farm	
Tomb Blaster	2002	Chessington World of Adventures	Formerly Terror Tomb, refurbished in 2002 with new scenes and laser-gun game system; replaced The 5th Dimension in 1994
Toy Story Midway Mania!	2008; 2008; 2012	Disney California Adventure Park; Disney's Hollywood Studios; Tokyo DisneySea	
Transformers: The Ride 3D	2011; 2012; 2013; 2021	Universal Studios Singapore; Universal Studios Hollywood; Universal Studios Florida; Universal Studios Beijing	
TV's Family Favourites	1995−1998	Crinkley Bottom at Cricket St Thomas	
The Twilight Zone Tower of Terror	1994	Disney's Hollywood Studios	
Universe of Energy	1994−2017	Europa-Park	Rethemed as Madame Freudenreich Curiosités
Valhalla	2000	Blackpool Pleasure Beach	
Viaje al Centro de la Tierra	1970−1979	Parque de Atracciones de Madrid	
Viaje en el Tiempo	2001	Dinópolis	
Viaje Galáctico	1970−1986	Parque de Atracciones de Madrid	Replaced by Los Piratas
Volkanu: Quest for the Golden Idol	2022	Lost Island Theme Park	
Voyage to the Iron Reef	2015-2020	Knott's Berry Farm	Replaced by Knott's Bear-y Tales: Return to the Fair
Wacky Factory	2010	Lake Winnepesaukah	Formerly Castle
Wallace & Gromit's Thrill-O-Matic	2013	Blackpool Pleasure Beach	
Whacky Shack	1982	Joyland Amusement Park	Has since been removed
Whacky Shack	1970	Waldameer & Water World	The last remaining Bill Tracy Whacky Shack left in operation
Wild West Adventure	2000	Attractiepark Slagharen	
Wonder Mountain's Guardian	2014	Canada's Wonderland	

== See also ==
- Black light theatre
- Old Mill (ride)
