= Terror Tomb =

Dark ride at Chessington World of Adventures

Coordinates: 51°20′57″N 0°19′10″W

Chessington World of Adventures
- Area: Forbidden Kingdom
- Status: Closed
- Opening date: March 25, 1994
- Closing date: 2001
- Replaced: The 5th Dimension
- Replaced by: Tomb Blaster

Ride statistics
- Attraction type: Dark ride
- Manufacturer: Mack Rides
- Designer: Farmer Studios
- Theme: Ancient Egypt
- Capacity: 1,200 riders per hour
- Vehicles: 5
- Rows: 24
- Riders per row: 3
- Duration: 7 minutes

Terror Tomb (later renamed Forbidden Tomb) was a dark ride attraction at Chessington World of Adventures in southwest London, England, themed as an adventure inside a haunted tomb. The ride opened in March 25, 1994 along with the Forbidden Kingdom area.

== Ride information ==
The ride was created as a replacement for The 5th Dimension, using the same ride system and show building. The ride featured animatronics and theatrical effects with an Ancient Egyptian theme, mixing adventure, humour and horror. The story followed a corrupt tour guide named Abdab plotting to steal treasure from within the tomb, before he is captured by mummies and killed in a hard rock concert finale. The ride was produced by Farmer Studios for Chessington and its musical score was produced by Graham Smart.

Terror Tomb operated for seven years before closing in 2001, as the horror content was considered at odds with Chessington new family target audience. Most the ride's scenes were recycled for the replacement attraction Tomb Blaster, with the removal of most the characters.

== See also ==
- Chessington World of Adventures Resort
- The 5th Dimension
- Tomb Blaster
