= Tomb Blaster =

Dark ride

Coordinates: 51°20′57″N 0°19′10″W

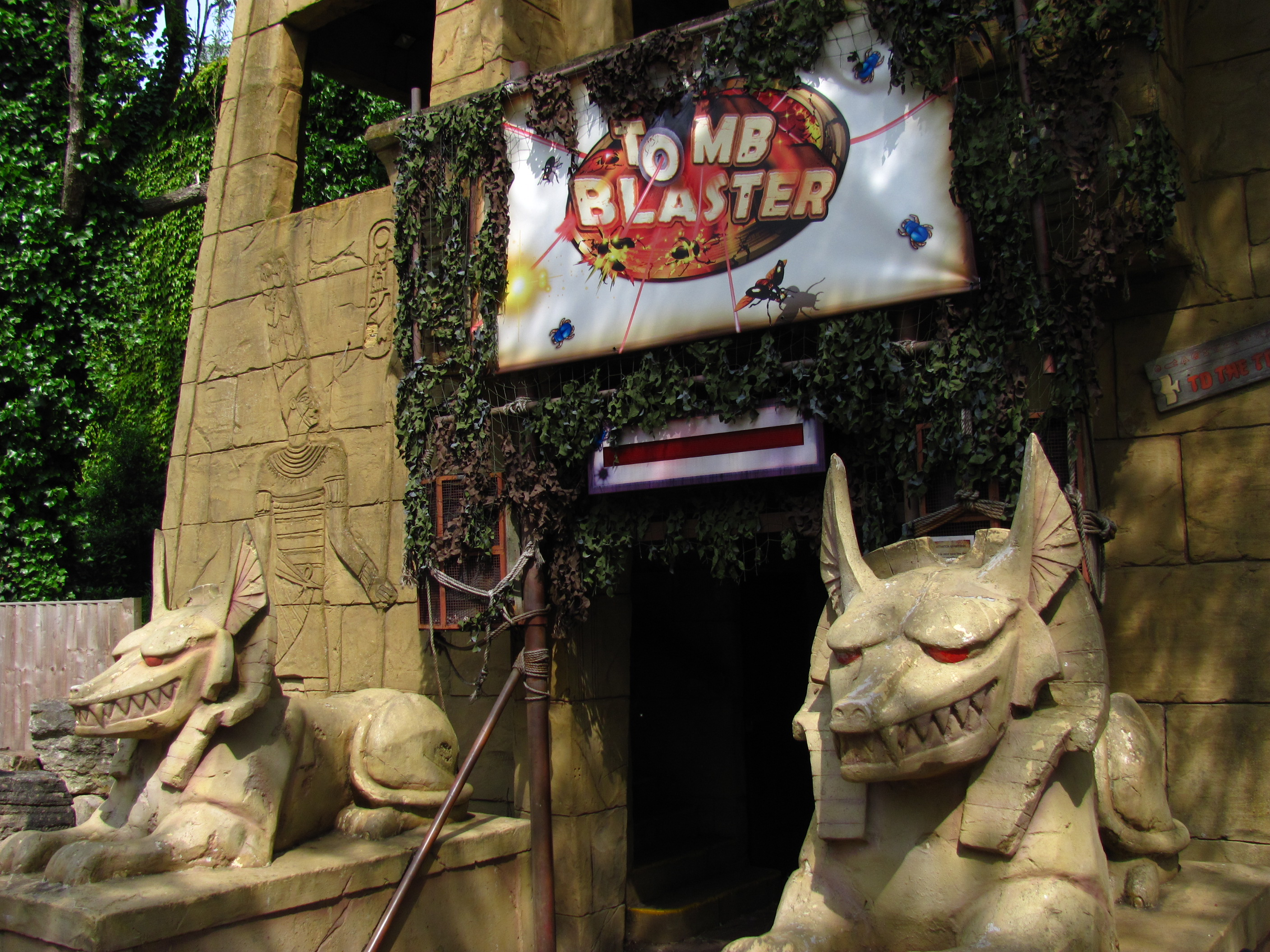

Chessington World of Adventures
- Area: Forbidden Kingdom
- Status: Operating
- Opening date: 2002
- Replaced: Terror Tomb

Ride statistics
- Attraction type: Dark ride
- Manufacturer: Mack Rides
- Designer: Tussauds Studios
- Theme: Ancient Egypt
- Capacity: 4 Trains - 500 riders per hour
- Vehicles: 5
- Rows: 12
- Riders per row: 2 in Front, 3 in Back
- Duration: 8 minutes
- Fast Track available
- Wheelchair accessible
- Must transfer from wheelchair

Tomb Blaster is a dark ride that opened in 2002 at Chessington World of Adventures Resort in London. Riders travel in trains through a series of crypts, shooting laser guns at targets for high scores.

== History ==
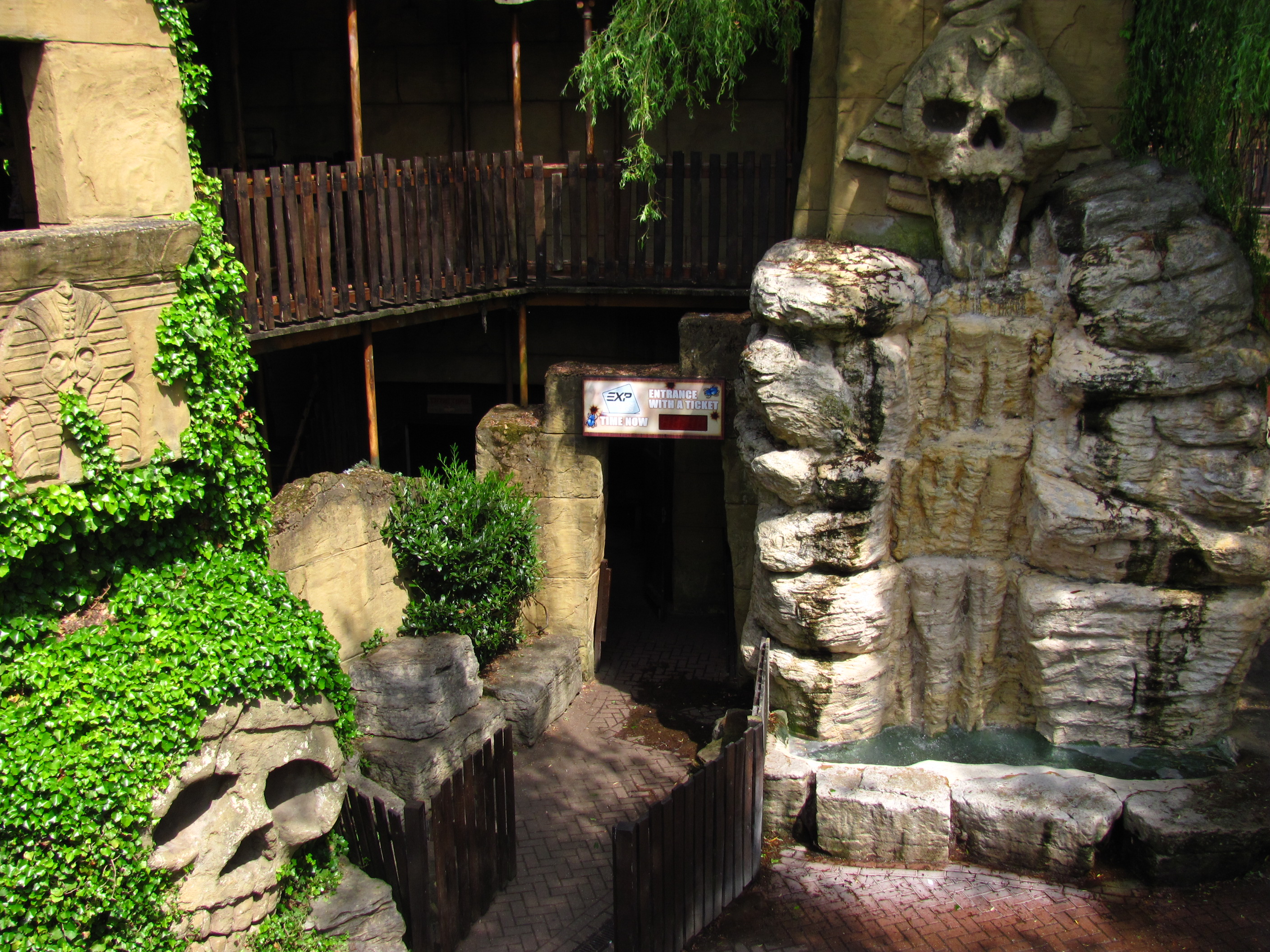
Scenic features in the queue line for Tomb Blaster, originally from Terror Tomb.

Tomb Blaster is a dark ride in the Forbidden Kingdom area of Chessington World of Adventures Resort. It originally opened as The 5th Dimension, a dark ride based on a story of a TV repair robot that operated from 1987 to 1993. The ride system was manufactured by Mack Rides.

The area was rethemed as the Forbidden Kingdom in 1994, and the ride became Terror Tomb, a horror ride in the dark.

In 2002 Tomb Blaster launched as a retheme of the old terror tomb ride utilising many of the sets but with some animatronics being replaced. In the dark ride riders shoot laser guns at targets. In August 2015, Tomb Blaster closed for undisclosed reasons. It then underwent a minor refurbishment during the closed season, with a new laser gun system, an ultraviolet scenic treatment and altered audio. The refurbished ride debuted during the annual pass preview weekend of 2016 to a negative response. General response from guests as well as fans of the ride criticised the "unprofessional" nature of the new lighting and audio alterations, citing missing sound effects, many animations still broken, missing pieces of the sets and excessive light spillage that revealed the areas intended to be covered by darkness.

In 2020, the attraction was revamped again with a new story overlay, new soundtrack created by Nick Hutson and new lighting, with some of the targets removed. The new story for the attraction is that guests are being recruited to rid the tomb of the curse of the high priest.

== Description ==
Anyone under 1.1 metres must be accompanied by an adult.

Riders sit in "utility vehicles" and travel through a tomb, shooting mummies and monsters with laser guns, and competing for top scores. Among the scenes are a crypt, a revolving tunnel, and snake pits. Many of the original set pieces from Terror Tomb remain in the Tomb Blaster ride with the exclusion of the Abdab animatronics and the entirety of the final concert scene, located where a giant cobra is now.

== Incident ==
On 7 June 2012, a four-year-old girl entered a near month-long coma after falling 14 ft from the ride's raised queue line. Severe injuries occurred, including broken ribs, a cracked skull, and bleeding on the brain.

The queue line's protective wooden fence panelling was both untreated and positioned in an area which was subject to rainwater runoff from a nearby roof. It had over the years become rotten due to weathering. Palings had previously fallen from the fence and had been nailed back into place despite their rotten nature. No formal records of the repairs were kept. A paling from the fence had fallen out on the day of the incident, leaving a gap through which the girl fell. Chessington World of Adventures was fined £150,000 after pleading guilty to breaching the Health and Safety Act (1974).

== Gallery ==
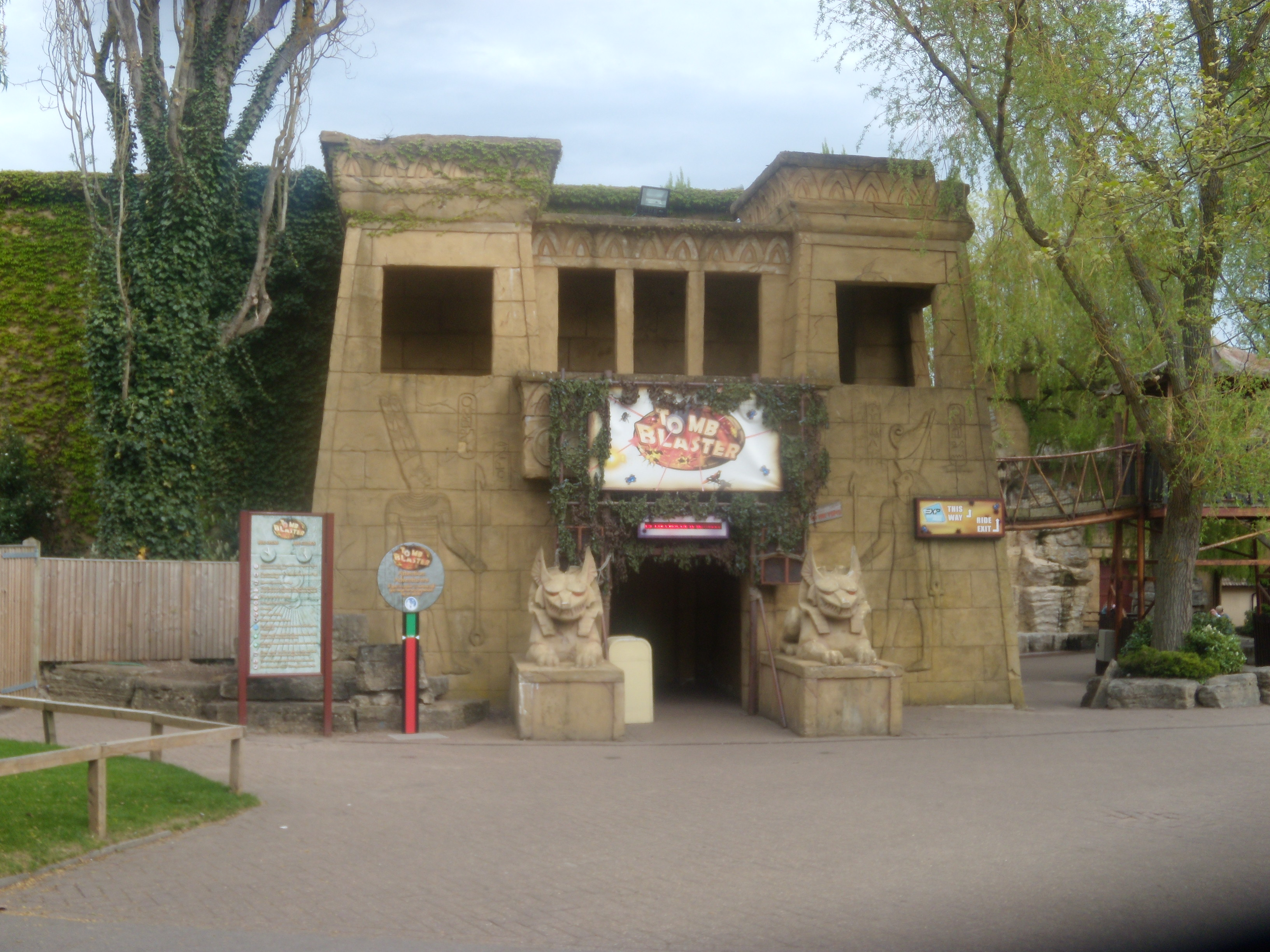
Image of the exterior

== See also ==
- Chessington World of Adventures Resort
- Terror Tomb
- The 5th Dimension
