= Mystic Motel =

Mystic Motel is a homemade dark ride based on an abandoned motel, found in Southern California, USA. It was built by game designer Scott D'Avanzo and his family in their garage and courtyard, and is notable for the media attention it received between 2013 and 2015.

== History ==
Construction of the dark ride began in August 2013 with no plan to open it for Halloween the same year. The first version of the ride had no walkthrough component but after a second Kickstarter campaign, the walkthrough motel was added.

== Kickstarter Campaign ==
A Kickstarter campaign was launched in 2013 aiming for $1000. It was successfully funded, with $1,355 by October 31, 2013. A second campaign was launched on October 7, 2014 for another $1000. It was also successfully funded by October 17, 2014. Most recently, a third campaign in 2015 also raised a further $1000.

== Backstory ==
The ride uses the following text as its backstory:

Mystic Motel was a motel built in 1955 located in the sun bathed and cactus infested desert along US Route 66. A hot spot through the 1970s, the motel was eventually abandoned and forgotten until Jack Turner (fictional character) purchased it for its mysterious activities. Jack knew he could make a buck off folks daring enough to take a ride through its mysterious basement. With parts of the motel actually caving through the basement ceiling, some of the motel's visitors have never left. Jack kept one of the original maintenance workers (Charlie) on staff to scare off any vandals. Only riders of Mystic Motel will figure out why Charlie has gone so crazy!

== Ride ==
The ride is divided up into two sections: a walkthrough of the motel and the ride itself, set in the motel's basement.

=== Pre-ride Experience ===
In front of the queue, there is a mock newscast video with Jack Turner explaining the backstory. There are two queues: a normal speed queue and a queue reserved for sponsors only.

=== Walkthrough ===
The ride starts in a darkened room with a voice over explaining the backstory. A light turns on, illuminating a door handle. Walking through the door, the rider comes in front of the motel receptionist. They invite you to look at an old woman through a hole in a wall. The rider is warned not to disturb any of the motel's guests. Continuing on through the corridor, the rider comes to a casino, seen through a hole in the wall. There are various shouts. A face in the wall peers through at the rider. Going past two room doors, the rider come to a third, which is ajar. Going in, a woman in bed asks the rider to get her husband out of the shower. In the bathroom, the husband jumps out at, shouting at the rider to get out. The receptionist comes to calm the guests and chase the rider along. The rider is shouted at by other guests. They then come to the ride loading area

=== Ride ===
As the ride starts, the rider first comes to the room of Charlie, the maintenance worker, where his TV turns on suddenly, displaying static. Continuing on, the rider comes in front of the furnace, and a large simulated fireball explodes in front of the rider. In the next section, various different faces hang down. Finally, a face comes up on a screen in front of the rider and vomits up blood. The rider then comes back into the loading area.

== Ride In 2013 ==
The original version of the ride in 2013 had no walkthrough section. In front of the queue, there was a mock newscast video with Jack Turner explaining the backstory. There were two queues: a normal speed queue and a FastPass queue. Coming in through the double doors, the rider first came to the maintenance worker Charlie, whose vicious dog jumped up at the rider. An old woman above the rider rocked back and forth seen through a caved in ceiling. Various faces hung down. Finally, a large simulated fireball blasted at the rider. The rider then came back into the loading area.

== Ride in 2015 ==
The ride is currently being updated for 2015; in the Mystic Motel Twitter feed, D'Avanzo has stated that they are currently shooting short teasers for Mystic Motel for release in the summer of 2015. On the 27th of June, behind-the-scenes photos were released of these teasers. D'Avanzo has stated that the ride itself will be significantly longer, and that three ride vehicles have been constructed, to cut the previous two hour long waiting times. He's also said that 2015 will be Mystic Motel's last year as a home haunt, and will hopefully become commercial afterwards.

== Technical Details ==
The track is approximately 60 feet long. The single remotely controlled ride vehicle is based on a mobility scooter. Motion sensors trigger props.

== Media Attention ==
Mystic Motel has been featured in various different publications, online and offline, as well as podcast CoasterRadio. ABC News also shot footage there for Good Morning America, but it was never aired.

== Long Term Aims ==
D'Avanzo has stated that in future he would like to build a larger scale version of Mystic Motel for commercial use.
