= Wakayama Marina City =

Resort town in Wakayama, Japan

- Interactive map of Wakayama Marina City
- Location: 1527, Kemi, Wakayama-shi, Wakayama-ken, Japan
- Coordinates: 34.16114333°N 135.1797904°E
- Status: Operating
- Opened: July 16, 1994
- Owner: Wakayama Marina City Company, Limited
- Area: 49 ha (120 acres)
- Website: https://www.marinacity.com/eng/

Wakayama Marina City is a resort town built on an artificial island of 49 hectares (120 acres) in size, in Wakaura Bay, part of the larger Osaka Bay. It is also part of Wakayama-shi (City) Wakayama-ken (Prefecture) on the Kansai Peninsula, about a forty-minute train ride south of the Kansai International Airport, which is itself built on an artificial island. The nearest large city is Osaka, Japan, about an hour by train to the north.

== History ==
Wakayama Marina City is one of ten artificial islands in Wakaura Bay, a feature of the larger Osaka Bay. It was built from fill removed from a nearby mountain, and is disconnected from the coastline, except for two bridges to the mainland. There are also two saltwater canals crossing the island. Construction of the island began in April, 1989. It opened to the public in 1994. Marina City was originally developed by Matsushita Investment and Development Company, Ltd. (MID) and Wakayama Prefecture. It now supports a large marina, run by the Wakayama Marina City Yacht Club, the Wakayama Marina City Hotel (sometimes called the Royal Pines Hotel), the Kuroshio Ichiba (fish market), the Kuroshio Onsen (spa) and Porto Europa, a theme park created by MCA (Universal Studios). At that time, both MID and MCA were owned by Matsushita Electric Industrial Company (MEI), which has been rebranded to Panasonic since 2008. MEI bought MCA in 1989.

== Porto Europa ==
The Porto Europa theme park was created by MCA Planning and Development (P&D), which was Universal Studios' creative arm prior to its renaming as Universal Creative in 1997. The park was built using American specialty vendors and Japanese construction companies, and opened in July 1994. With a footprint of 4.5 acres (1.8 hectares), Porto Europa consists of three themed areas: a French, an Italian and a Spanish town. There are three major attractions, a flume ride/dark ride combination, a motion simulator/film ride, and an indoor stunt show which is now closed, with the theater space empty. The smaller attractions at opening included a jazz club, disco, cinema, laser tag, and virtual reality installation. There are also retail outlets, restaurants, and street shows.

=== High Dive ===
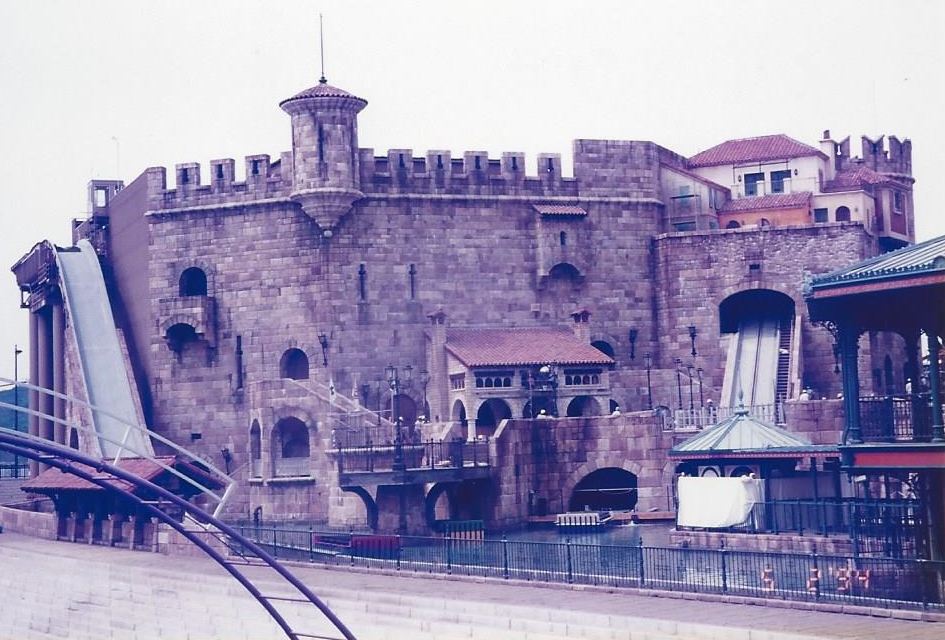
High Dive ride under construction

The High Dive ride is located in the Spanish Castle portion of the park. The load platform and splashdown pool are located outdoors, below the castle, with an observation deck/splash zone overhead. The ride vehicles ascend into the building, through an automated guillotine door, and into a spiraling fog vortex. Once at the top, the vehicle splashes down into a flume, which curves through the upper story of the building. This is the dark ride portion, which features a number of special effects including fog, blacklight effects, wind, animated figures and a 20-foot high parting waterfall. The vehicles then exit the building and curve around the rear of the castle before being released down the 65-foot slide into the splash pool. The ride system is by Arrow Dynamics. The ride is shown in the photograph reproduced to the right.

=== Seafari ===
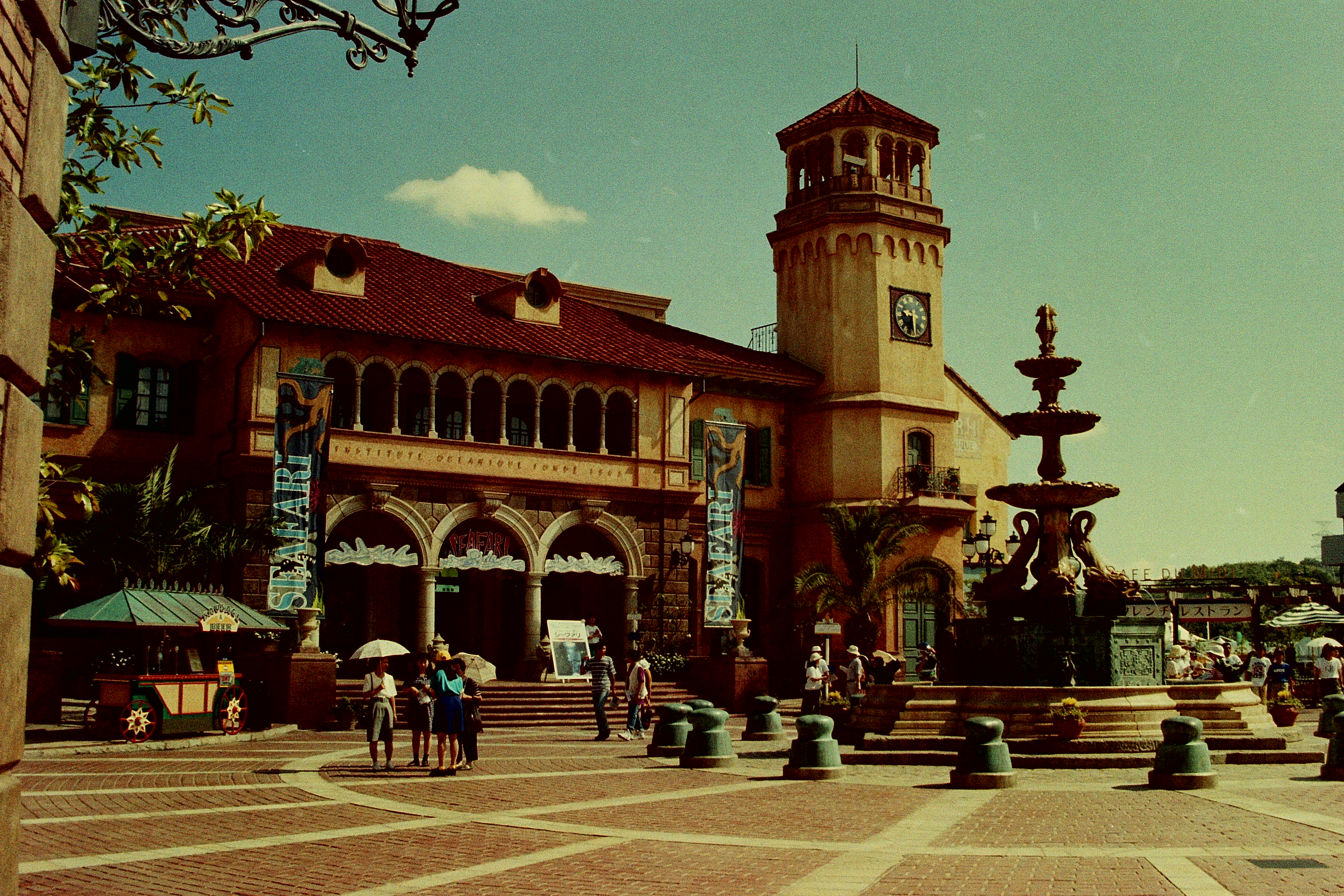
Looking across plaza at Seafari Entry, French facade

The Seafari simulator ride is in the French-themed village, and occupies the majority of the space in the main building. It features an extensive preshow, including a moon pool with a 29-foot submarine hanging over it, as if it has been launched and recovered from the deep below. Guests move from the moon pool area to the Aqualab where they meet Sammy, a CGI dolphin who appears to be swimming in a 13-foot tank at guests' eye level. From this space, guests move into a 15-passenger themed submarine, which is in the actual motion base theater. The Seafari motion bases are by Hughes Training. The ride film is a 3.5 minute Computer-generated imagery (CGI) short, in color, produced by Rhythm & Hues. At the time, it was considered one of the best CGI animated films ever made. The film was later used at PortAventura Park in Spain, renamed Sea Odyssey. It opened there in 2000. Universal Studios owned PortAventura World at the time.

=== Viking Adventure ===
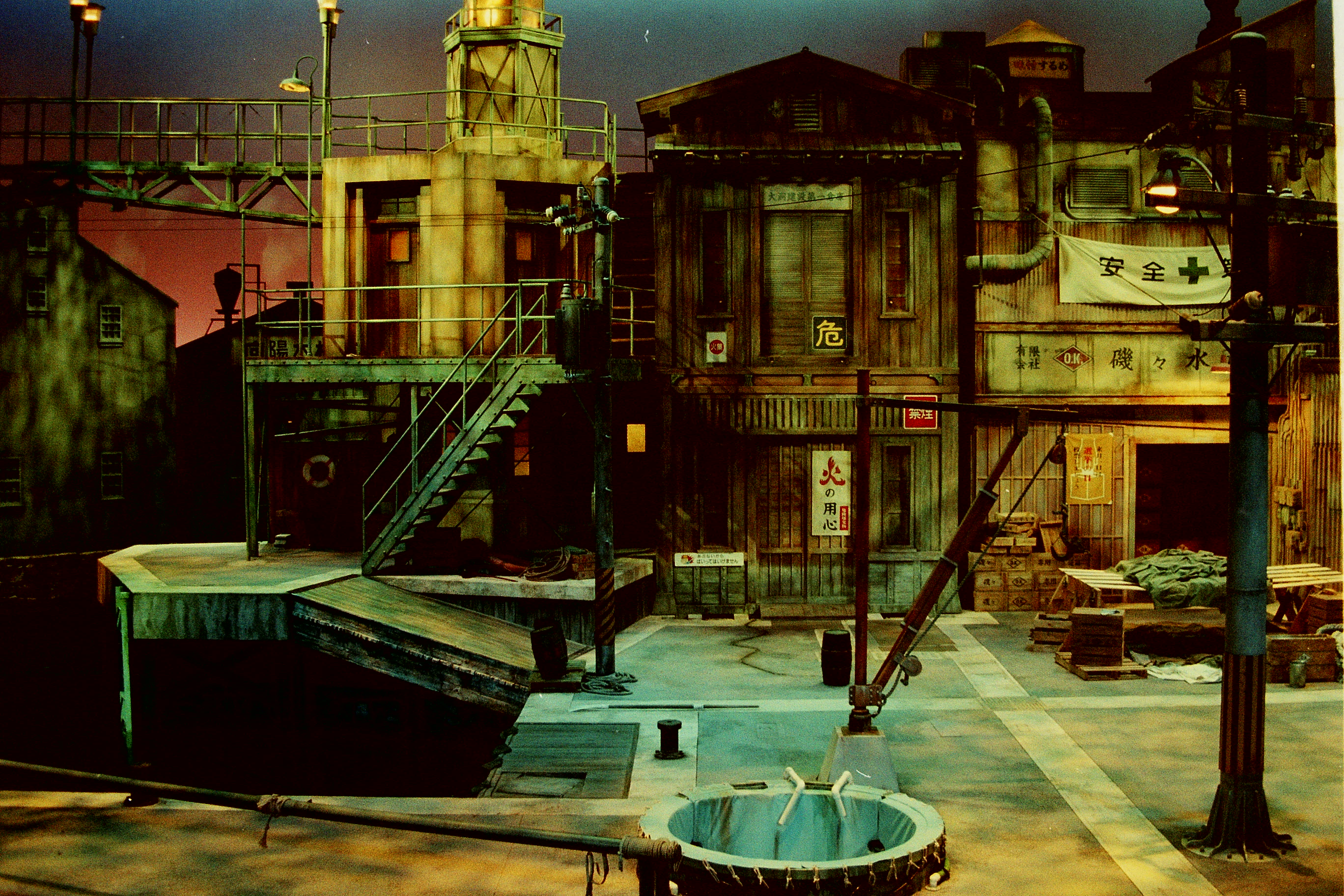
Viking Adventure set under stage lighting, center stage portion

The Viking Adventure Stunt Show is also located inside the Spanish Castle, occupying four floors, from the basement to the third level, the same level as the dark ride portion of the High Dive. The theatre space is an indoor amphitheater, featuring curved, steeply raked seating. Immediately opposite is a 110-foot wide curved plaster cyclorama approximately three stories high. The stage and set sits between the two. The rendering in the center left of the opening program gives some sense of the scale. The show itself is actually an adaptation of the Western Stunt Show, formerly at Universal Studios Hollywood and Universal Studios Florida. Some of the recycled stunts include the 8.5 ton falling wall, a rotating swaypole which swings an actor over the audience, an exploding well, a slide-for-life, again over the audience, and a high fall onto a wood pile. In the case of Viking Adventure, each stunt is larger and more extreme-looking than their predecessors. New are the moving iceberg, fast elevator, high bridge, and the pool and diving well. The action is supported by massive lighting, sound, pyrotechnic and special effects systems. The lighting, sound and show control systems were advanced state-of-the-art installations at the time. While theme park show control systems have long made use of industrial automation, such as programmable logic controllers (PLCs), Viking Adventure was the first to make full use of MIDI Show Control to completely synchronize the mechanical effects, atmospheric effects, lighting console, pyrotechnic controller, and audio system.

=== Minor attractions ===
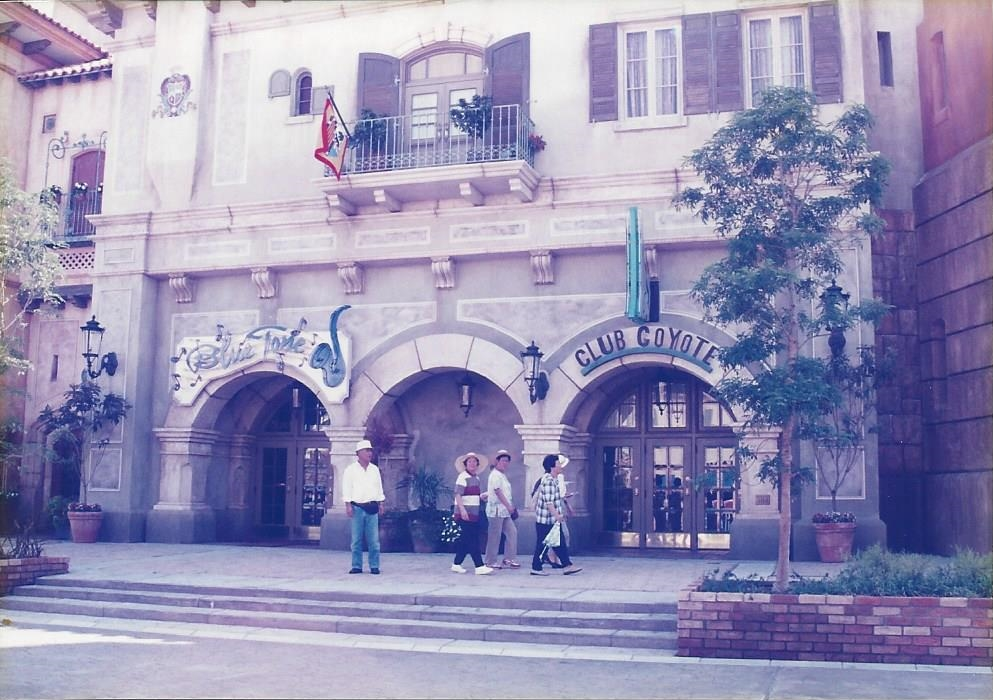
Entry to Blue Tone and Club Coyote, Italian village facade

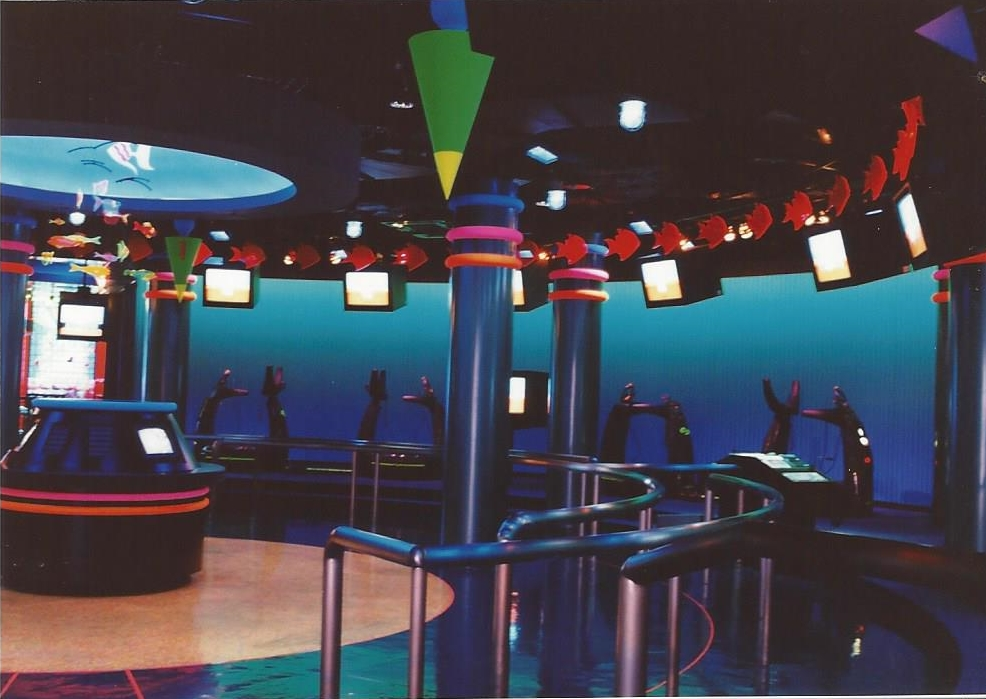
Interior of Virtuality (virtual reality attraction) Porto Europa

The smaller attractions in the French-themed area include Laser Tech, a laser tag installation, the International Cinema, which featured a 20-minute custom-produced cartoon at opening, and a large French restaurant. The Italian village, located between the French and Spanish buildings, contains the bulk of the retail, an Italian restaurant, Virtuality, a virtual reality gaming space, Monte Carlo, an arcade, Club Coyote, a western-themed discothèque, and Blue Tone, a live jazz venue. The Spanish castle, with two major attractions, houses only an American casual restaurant on the deck above High Dive.

== Iron Ride Park & Japan Expo ==
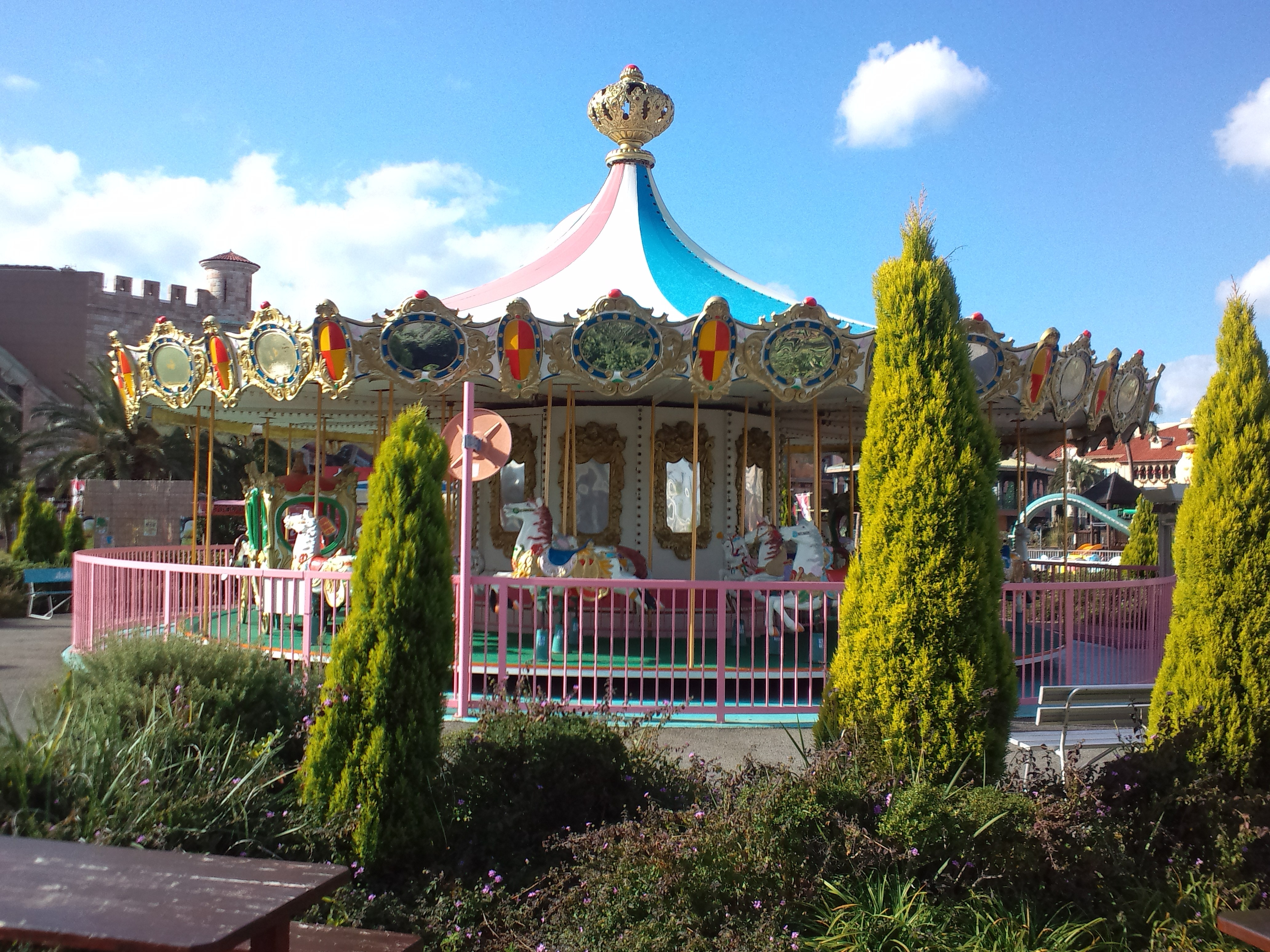
Part of Iron Ride Park

At the time Porto Europa was completed, the area immediately behind the site and across the canal, was empty. During the grand opening, the Japan Expo was held on this site for 72 days. The owner has since installed a non-themed ride park, which is often confused with Porto Europa proper. This newer area has more in common with an American state fair and carnival than a theme park. This area features iron rides, including two coasters, merry-go-rounds, water slides, and a Ferris wheel. The coasters are Round and Round (Meisho) and Pinestar (Vekoma).

== Kuroshio Ichiba ==
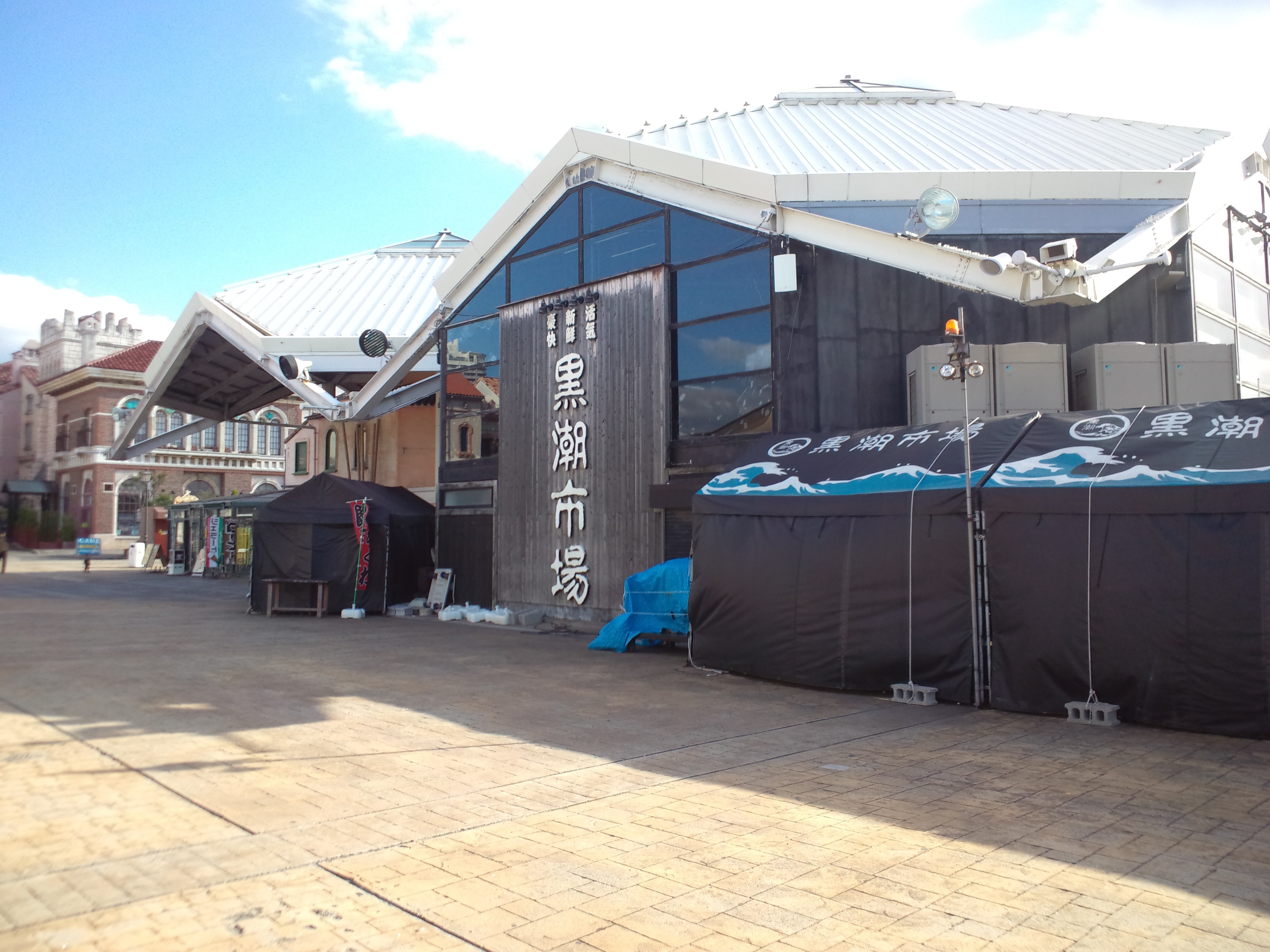
Kuroshio-Ichiba

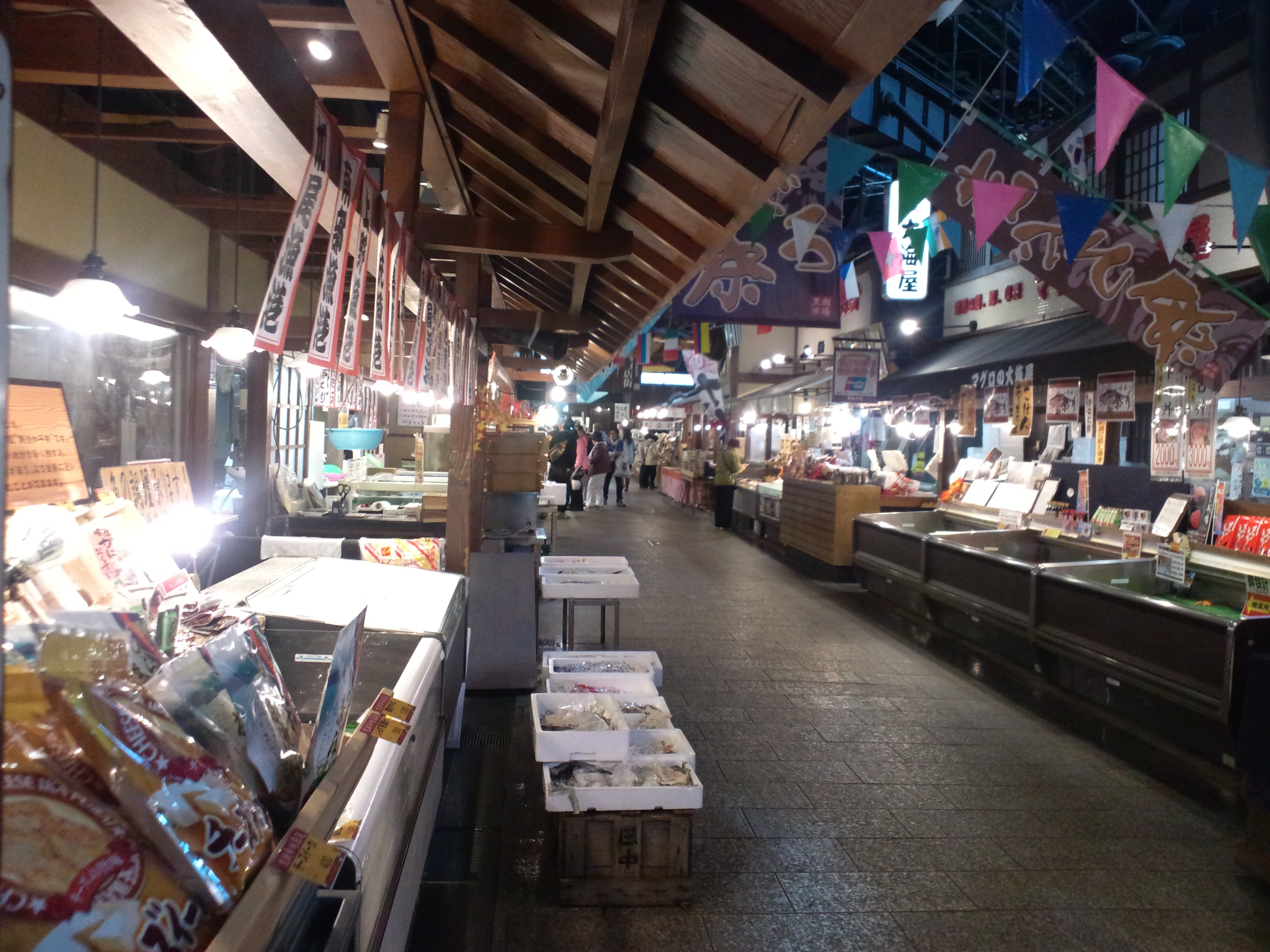
Kuroshio-Ichiba

An ichiba is a market, of which there are two in Marina City. The larger is a "fisherman's wharf"-style fish market, which sells both fresh-caught fish and cooked fish dishes. There are small fire pits available both inside and outside to allow guests to cook their purchases on site. Aside from the food, the principal attraction is a whole tuna filleting show. The building itself features 6,767.08 square meters of floor space on four levels. The smaller market is an outdoor farmers market, featuring fruit and vegetables from the local farmers.

== Kuroshio Onsen ==
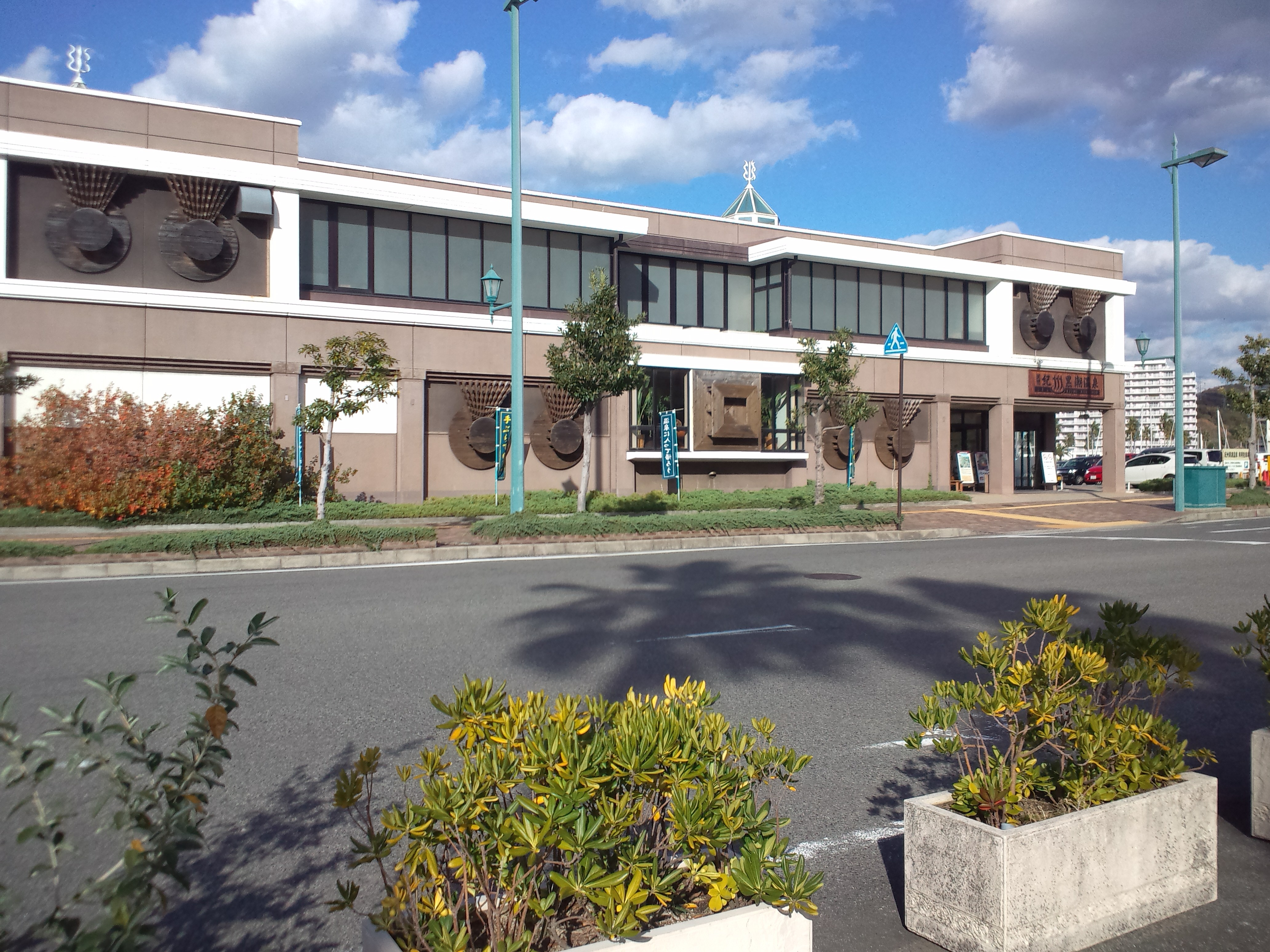
Kishû Kuroshio Onsen

An onsen is a Japanese hot spring bathing facility that can have freestanding facilities or be associated with a nearby inn or hotel. The facility at Marina City (sometimes referred to as Kishu Kuroshio Onsen) is a large stand-alone attraction which can be used independent of the island's hotel and theme park. It features both indoor and outdoor facilities, which includes a sauna and rock bath. The hot spring water comes from a 1500-meter-deep well.

== Wakayama Marina City Yacht Club ==
The marina consists of approximately 1,100 in-water berths for craft up to 80 feet in length, and on-shore storage for smaller craft on trailers. The usual marina facilities are available, along with amenities including water, fuel, waste disposal and a powered boat lift. The marina opened in July, 1995. The harbor, and island generally, is protected by an extensive breakwater of approximately 920 meters in length. This breakwater is unique in Japan, as public access is permitted on extensive walkways and other public spaces, including a fishing pier. The design is called a "water-affinity" breakwater by the designer, and features vertical slit caissons and other safety features to allow safe access.
