= The 5th Dimension (ride) =

Dark ride at Chessington World of Adventures (1987 - 1993)

Coordinates: 51°20′57″N 0°19′10″W

5th Dimension

Chessington World of Adventures
- Status: Removed
- Opening date: 1987
- Closing date: 1993
- Replaced by: Terror Tomb

Ride statistics
- Attraction type: Dark ride
- Manufacturer: Mack Rides
- Designer: Tussauds Studios
- Model: Prototype dark ride transit
- Theme: Cyberspace
- Capacity: 1,200 riders per hour
- Vehicles: 5
- Rows: 24
- Riders per row: 4
- Duration: 7 minutes

The 5th Dimension was a dark ride at the Chessington World of Adventures Resort in southwest London, England, which debuted with the opening of the theme park in 1987. The ride closed at the end of the 1993 season and was replaced by Terror Tomb, which in turn has been replaced by Tomb Blaster. The ride was designed with cars that could stop and rotate to face what was happening in the scene; the same transit system is in use today.

== History ==
The ride opened in the summer of 1987, designed and produced by Madame Tussauds Studios and originally sponsored by Hitachi. The ride followed the character of "computer trouble shooter" robot Zappomatic, through a series of eclectic scenes set inside a malfunctioning computer-generated reality, with large-scale animations and special effects. The transit system was manufactured by Mack Rides from a bespoke concept by John Wardley.

The ride was extensively redesigned for its second season to make it more appealing to younger visitors, including rewriting Zappomatic as a TV repair robot on a mission to defeat a virus named "The Gorg". The ride operated for another six seasons, until being replaced by Terror Tomb in 1994.

== See also ==
- Chessington World of Adventures Resort
- Terror Tomb
- Tomb Blaster
