= Pirates Cove =

Bay in California, United States of America

Coordinates: 37°51′06″N 122°33′50″W

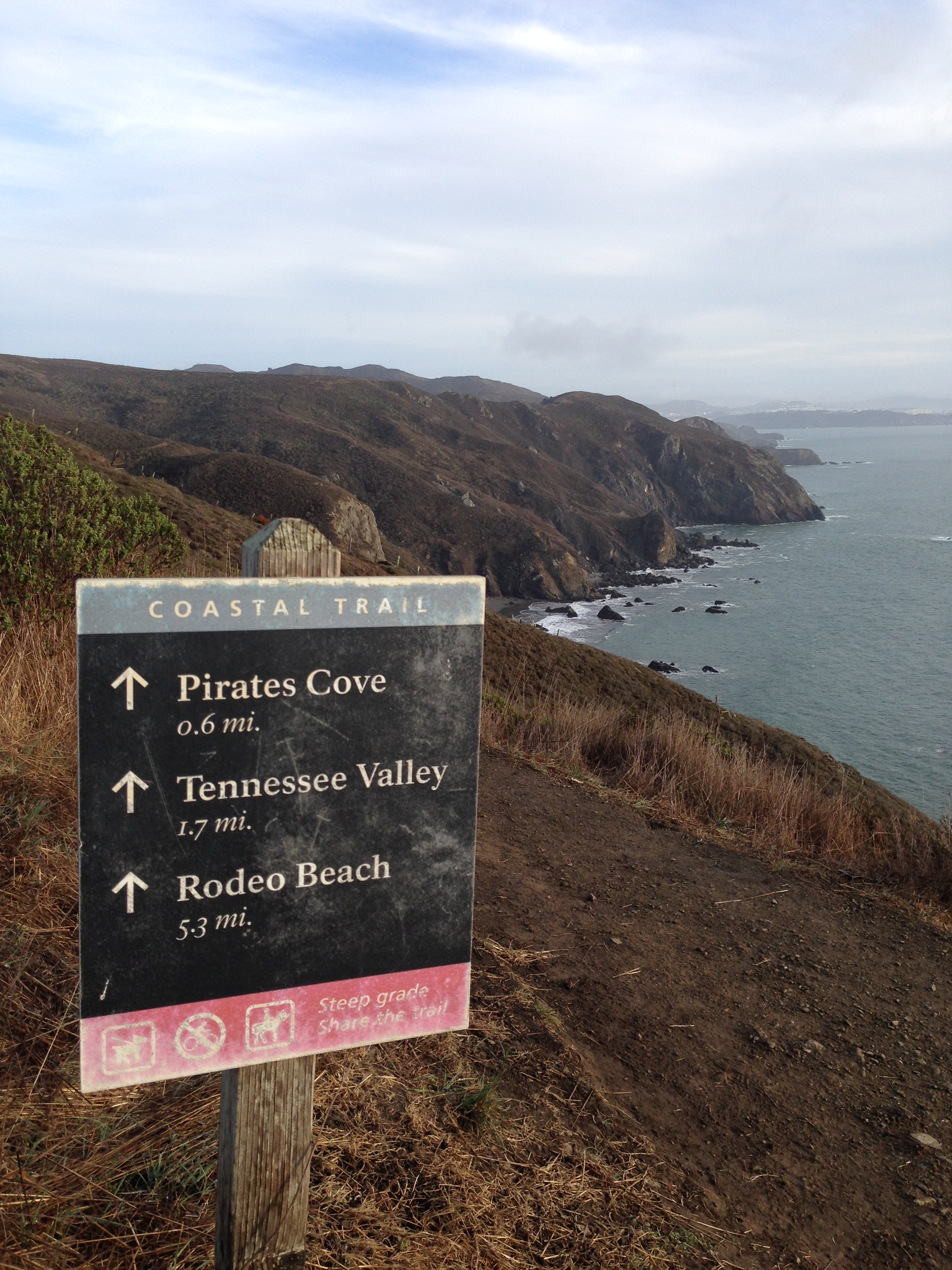
The sign at the trailhead to Pirates Cove, just past Muir Beach

Pirates Cove is an embayment in Marin County, California, United States, between Muir Beach and Tennessee Cove. A trail leads from the terminus of the California Coastal Trail to a small beach area, surrounded by steep hills and coastal scrub.

There is also a nude beach called Pirates Cove 5 miles west north west of Pismo Beach and 6.7 miles south south west of Madonna Inn, San Luis Obispo, CA.
