= Tutuki Splash =

Water ride in Spain

Coordinates: 41°05′06″N 1°09′28″E

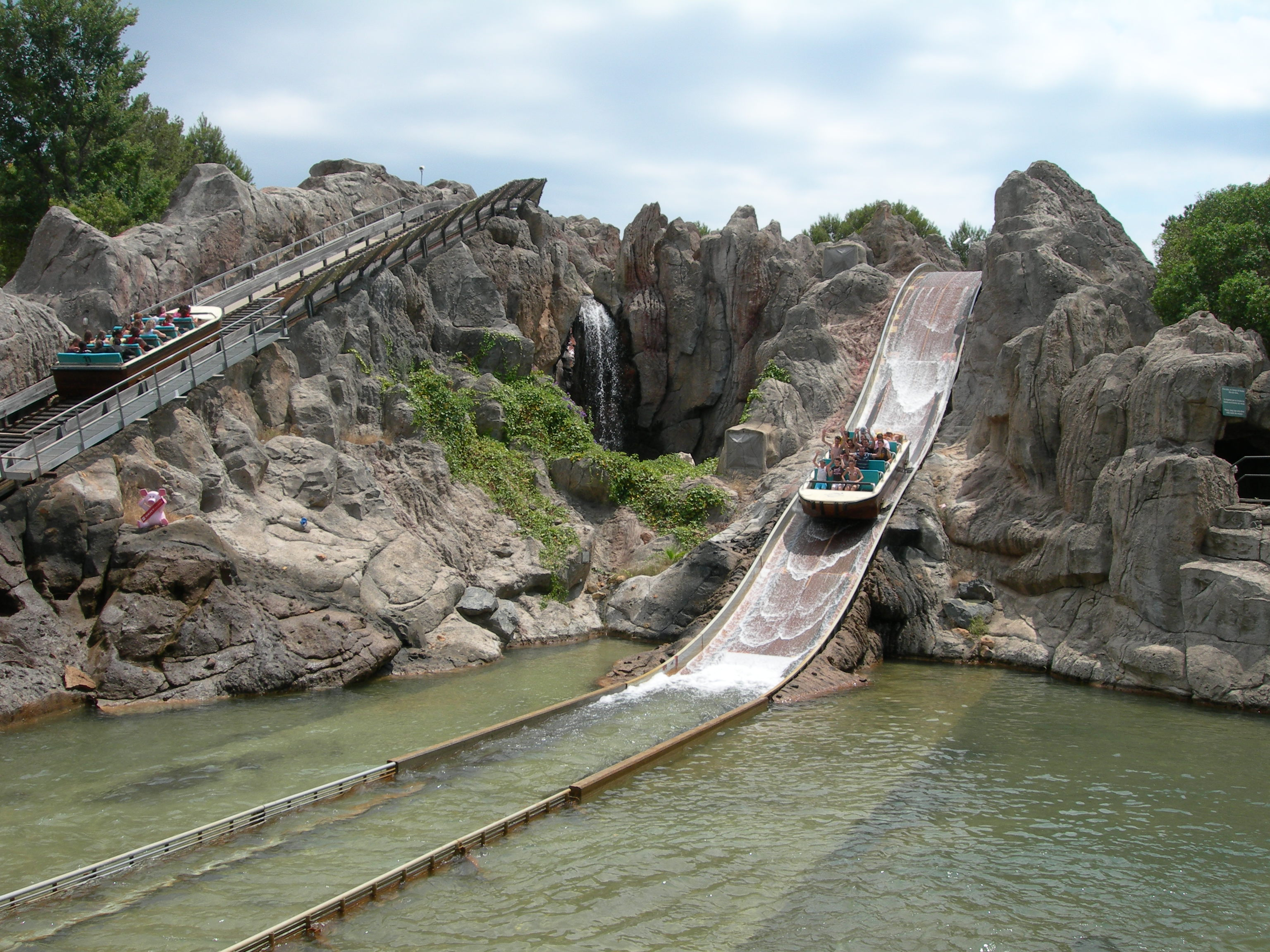

PortAventura Park
- Area: Polynesia
- Status: Operating
- Opening date: 1995

General statistics
- Type: Shoot the Chute
- Manufacturer: Intamin
- Model: Shoot the Chute
- Lift system: Chain lift hill
- Drop: 50 ft (15 m)
- Speed: 35 mph (56 km/h)

Tutuki Splash is a water ride, opened in 1995 at PortAventura Park in the resort PortAventura World, Salou, Spain. It is located on an artificial volcano in the Polynesia section of the park. The ride begins with a slow, gentle river, followed by a dark tunnel around a bend, and a small drop where a photograph of the passengers is taken. There is no lift needed for the drop as the station is on elevated ground. There is another slow river and a steep lift hill. At the top, the raft plunges down a drop reaching the highest speed of the ride (35 mph). It floats back to the station while onlookers can spray passengers with water from the bridge above.

== See also ==
- PortAventura World
- Water ride
- Tidal Wave (Thorpe Park)
