= Uncharted: The Enigma of Penitence =

Launched roller coaster

PortAventura Park
- Location: PortAventura Park
- Park section: Far West
- Coordinates: 41°05′22.3″N 1°09′18.5″E
- Status: Operating
- Opening date: 17 June 2023

General statistics
- Type: Steel – Enclosed – Launched
- Manufacturer: Intamin
- Designer: Sally Corporation
- Lift/launch system: LSM
- Height: 12.0 m (39.4 ft)
- Length: 700 m (2,300 ft)
- Inversions: 0
- Duration: 1.48
- Capacity: 900 riders per hour
- Height restriction: 130 cm (4 ft 3 in)
- Trains: 3 trains with a single car; riders arranged 4 across in 3 rows for a total of 12 riders per train
- Website: Official website
- Uncharted: The Enigma of Penitence at RCDB

Uncharted: The Enigma of Penitence is a launched enclosed roller coaster at PortAventura Park in Salou, Spain. The ride is based on the Uncharted franchise.

== History ==
In November 2022, PortAventura World announced they had closed an agreement with Sony Pictures to build a dark ride roller coaster which was based on the film Uncharted. The ride was built by Intamin and Sally Corporation. The costs for the new roller coaster were 25 million euros. The ride opened on June 17, 2023.

== Theme ==
Visitors to the roller coaster experience the discovery of explorers Nathan Drake and Sully as they search for a large Aztec treasure that was hidden 500 years ago in "Penitence Mountain". The story of the attraction is told to visitors in a number of waiting areas.

== Ride ==
The roller coaster has a total of five launches, one of which is sideways.
