= PortAventura World =

Family holiday resort in Spain

PortAventura World Parks & Resort
- Previously known as * Universal Mediterranea (2002–2004) * PortAventura (2005–2012) * PortAventura: European Destination Resort (2013–2015)
- Interactive map of PortAventura World Parks & Resort
- Location: Salou and Vila-seca, Catalonia, Spain
- Coordinates: 41.086839°N 1.157272°E
- Opened: 13 June 2002; 24 years ago (resort); 1 May 1995; 31 years ago (first park)
- Owner: Investindustrial; KKR
- Operated by: Investindustrial
- General manager: David Garcia Blanco
- Slogan: Made To Remember
- Operating season: Spring through winter
- Attendance: 5.2 million (2019)
- Area: 119 ha 294 acres

Attractions
- Total: 53
- Roller coasters: 10
- Water rides: 5
- Website: Official website

PortAventura World is an entertainment resort in Salou and Vila-seca, Tarragona, on the Costa Daurada in Catalonia, Spain. It was built around the PortAventura Park theme park, which attracts around 5.3 million visitors per year, making it the most visited theme park in Spain and the sixth most visited theme park in Europe. The resort consists of PortAventura theme park, Ferrari Land theme park, and Caribe Aquatic Park

In 2017, with the opening of Ferrari Land, the resort rebranded to PortAventura World. The resort has three theme parks, six hotels, a convention center, and an RV park. Reus Airport lies within 15-minute drive, and Barcelona Airport is within an hour. The train station Salou-Port Aventura is 750m from the resort entrance and features line R17 trains to Barcelona and Tarragona.

== History ==
When Port Aventura opened in 1995 in Salou, The Tussauds Group owned 40.0% of the park, while La Caixa had 33.2%, Anheuser-Busch had 19.9%, and FECSA had 6.7%. In 1998, the majority of Tussauds Group's shares in the park were sold to Universal and the park was rebranded as 'Universal's Port Aventura', which made it the first Universal Studios theme park in Europe.

In 2002, a water park (Costa Caribe) and two hotels (Hotel PortAventura and Hotel El Paso) were constructed, and the resort was further rebranded as 'Universal Mediterranea'. In 2004, NBCUniversal (Universal Studios' parent) sold all interest in PortAventura. It is owned and operated by La Caixa Banking Group's investment vehicle Criteria, but as of 2005, the Universal name has been dropped from the branding, and the resort was once again named 'PortAventura' (the space in the name is deliberately left out for trademark reasons). In 2009, the resort hosted 3,310,000 visitors.

In December 2013, private equity firm KKR picked up a 49.9% stake in PortAventura from Investindustrial, which still owned 50.1%. In 2016, the resort was renamed 'PortAventura World Parks & Resort'. The second theme park, Ferrari Land, was inaugurated on April 7, 2017.

PortAventura Dream Village, which hosts families of children with serious illnesses with free therapeutic stays, opened in 2017.

Annual visits
	2012	2013	2014	2015	2016	2017	2018	2019
Visits to the parks	3,703,217	3,700,000	3,819,474	3,940,444	3,896,901	4,715,088	4,962,512	
Visits to PortAventura Park	3,439,444		3,494,998	3,499,375	3,528,908	3,607,937	3,589,918	≈3,700,000
Visits to PortAventura Caribe Aquatic Park	263,773		324,476	313,831	367,993	335,351	326,611	
Visits to Ferrari Land	–	–	–	–	–	713,421	1,045,983	
Visits to Cirque du Soleil	–	–	100,000	127,238	–	58,379	–	
International visits	35%	38%	36%	33%	33%	33%	36%	
Rooms occupied			323,723	334,409	337,219	376,026	390,200	
Participants at Convention Centre		44,461	64,536	81,352	72,461	68,782	73,671	
Events at Convention Centre			154	184	226	259	201	
Total visits (parks, hotels, convention centre)				4,984,092	4,946,389	5,837,509	6,130,308	
Balance sheet figures (thousands of euros)								
Non-current assets			913,867	934,196	968,483	997,964	988,362	
Current assets			31,939	19,802	27,320	44,740	58,822	
Equity and liabilities			945,806	953,998	995,803	1,042,704	1,047,184	
Current and non-current liabilities			500,990	492,577	515,062	548,418	543,028	
Income statement results (thousands of euros)								
Equivalent turnover	181,200	181,800	194,682	191,160	203,055	234,957	230,349	

== PortAventura Park ==
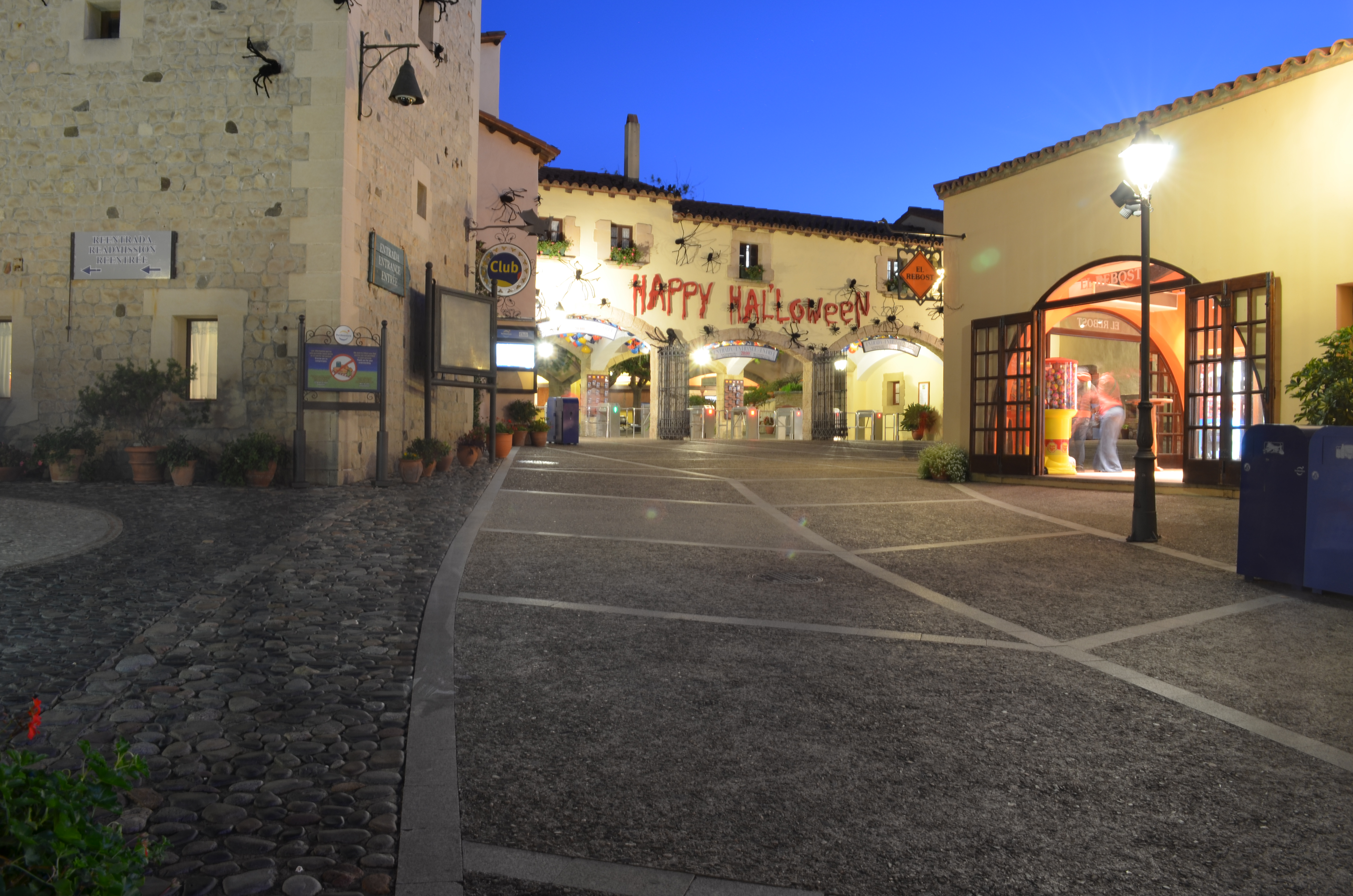
Entrance to the park

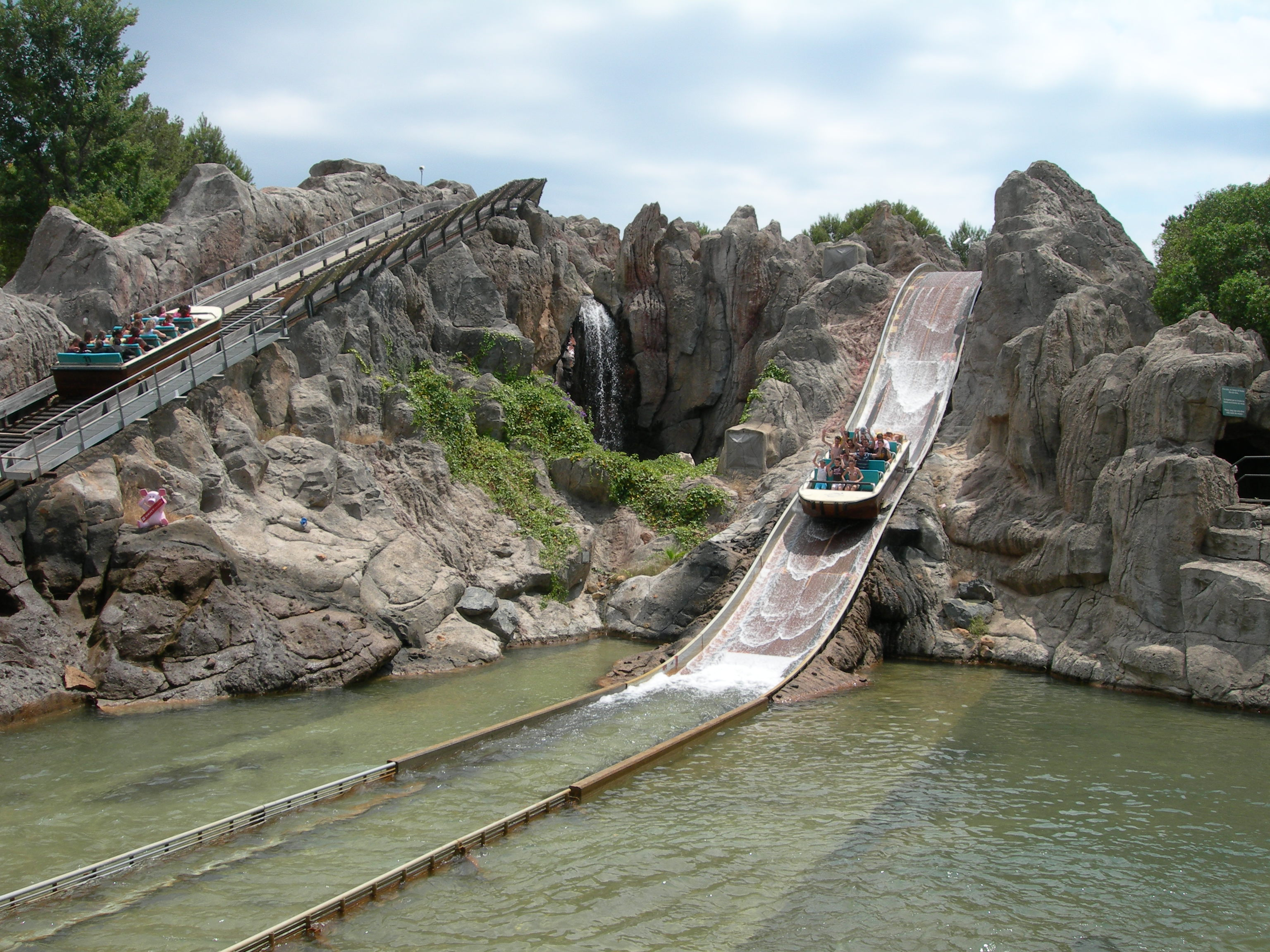
The Tutuki Splash water ride

The park features five theme areas based on civilizations (Mediterrània, Far West, México, China and Polynesia), and one theme area based on Sesame Street. Mediterrània is the main entrance area of the park.

Main rides

- Furius Baco, an Intamin Accelerator Coaster with winged seating, which opened in June 2007. It has a top speed of 83.9 mph (135 km/h).
- Uncharted: The Enigma of Penitence, an Intamin Multi-Dimension Coaster with rotating seats and special track effects that opened in 2023.
- Stampida, a dueling wooden roller coaster.
- Tomahawk, a junior version of Stampida and which runs parallel to it.
- Silver River Flume, a traditional log flume.
- Grand Canyon Rapids, a whitewater river rapids ride along the Grand Canyon.
- Hurakan Condor, an Intamin drop tower ride. This ride is one of the tallest in the world at 330 ft.
- El Diablo – Tren de la Mina, an Arrow Dynamics mine train roller coaster. The top speed of the coaster is around 60 km/h.
- Dragon Khan, with 8 inversions this formerly held the record as having more inversions than any other roller coaster. It also held the world record for the tallest vertical loop on any roller-coaster. The ride built by Bolliger & Mabillard was one of the two roller coasters that Port Aventura had when it opened. It consistently ranks among the world's best roller coasters in polls.
- Shambhala, this B&M hypercoaster beat three European records as it was the fastest (134 km/h) and tallest roller coaster in Europe. It is 76 m tall and had longest drop in Europe at 78 m (2 m underground).
- Angkor, a large splash battle themed in the Angkor ruins that opened in 2014.
- Tutuki Splash, a Shoot the Chute themed along an erupting volcano.
- Tami Tami, a roller coaster for children.
- Street Mission, an interactive Sesame Street dark ride.

=== Roller coasters ===
Name	Manufacturer	Speed	Height	Length	Location	Opened
Shambhala	Bolliger & Mabillard	83 miles per hour (134 km/h)	249 feet (76 m)	5,410 feet (1,650 m)	China	2012
Dragon Khan	Bolliger & Mabillard	65 miles per hour (105 km/h)	148 feet (45 m)	4,165 feet (1,269 m)	China	1995
Furius Baco	Intamin	83.9 miles per hour (135.0 km/h)	15 feet (4.6 m)	2,789 feet (850 m)	Mediterrània	2007
Uncharted: The Enigma of Penitence	Intamin, Sally Dark Rides	43 miles per hour (70 km/h)	39.4 feet (12 m)	2,300 feet (700 m)	Far West	2023
Stampida	CCI	46 miles per hour (74 km/h)	84 feet (26 m)	3,127 feet (953 m)	Far West	1997
Tomahawk	CCI	30 miles per hour (48 km/h)	44 feet (13 m)	1,444 feet (440 m)	Far West	1997
El Diablo – Tren de la Mina	Arrow Dynamics	37 miles per hour (60 km/h)	54 feet (16 m)	3,306 feet (1,008 m)	México	1995
Tami Tami	Vekoma	21.7 miles per hour (34.9 km/h)	28 feet (8.5 m)	679 feet (207 m)	SésamoAventura	1998

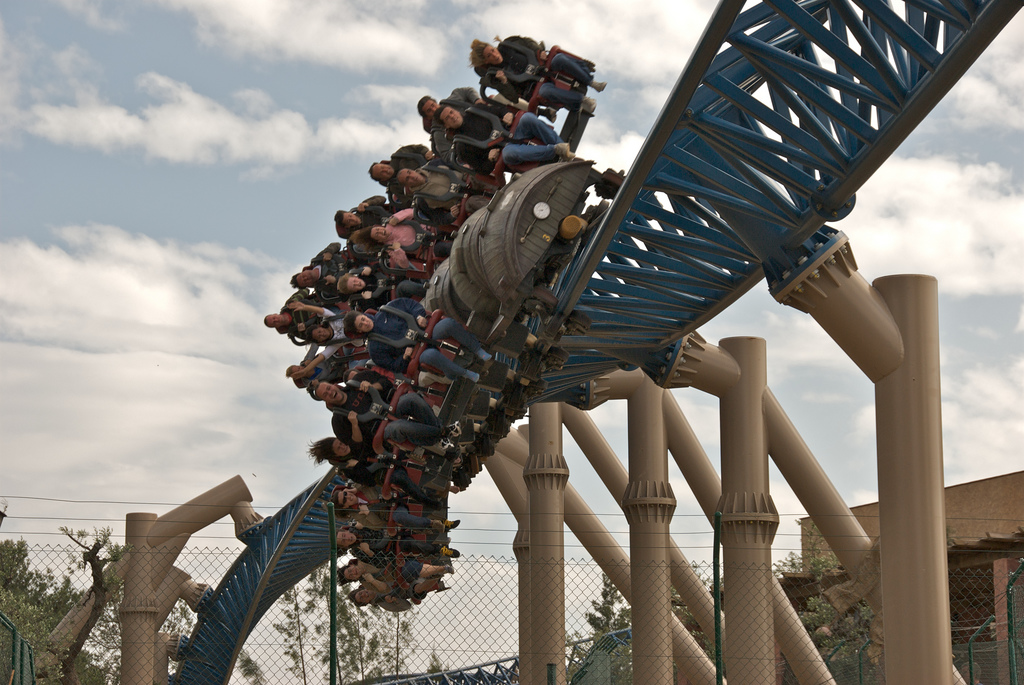
Furius Baco

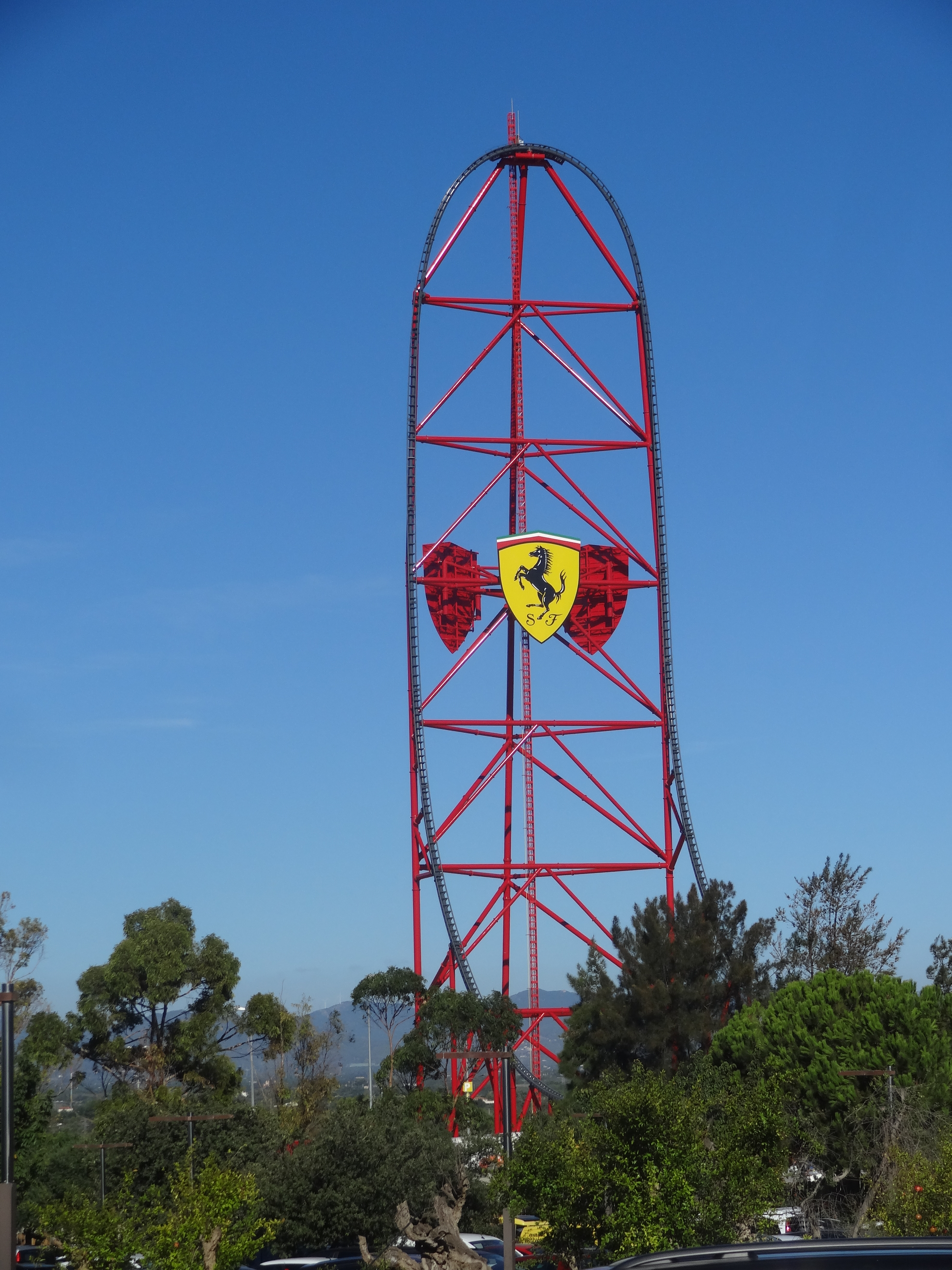
Red Force

=== Flat rides ===
Name	Manufacturer	Height	Speed	Length	Location	Opened
Kon-tiki Wave	HUSS Park Attractions	66 feet (20 m)	Unknown	Unknown	Polynesia	1995
Serpiente Emplumada	Schwarzkopf	9.8 feet (3.0 m)	Unknown	Unknown	México	1995
Yucatán	Mack Rides	–	13 revolutions per minute	Unknown	México	1995
Hurakan Condor	Intamin	330 feet (100 m)	71.4 miles per hour (114.9 km/h)	370 feet (110 m)	México	2005
Street Mission	Sally Corporation, ETF	–	Unknown	Unknown	SésamoAventura	2019

=== Water rides ===
Name	Manufacturer	Speed	Height	Length	Location	Opened
Tutuki Splash	Intamin	35 miles per hour (56 km/h)	45 feet (14 m)	01,438 feet (438 m)	Polynesia	1995
Silver River Flume	Mack Rides	35 miles per hour (56 km/h)	50 feet (15 m)	02,260 feet (690 m)	Far West	1995
Grand Canyon Rapids	Intamin	10 miles per hour (16 km/h)	–	02,800 feet (850 m)	Far West	1995
Canoes	Zamperla	10 miles per hour (16 km/h)	–	02,800 feet (850 m)	Polynesia	1995
Angkor	Mack Rides	10 miles per hour (16 km/h)	–	02,800 feet (850 m)	China	2014

=== Amusement rides using motion pictures ===
Name	Manufacturer	Height	Length	Location	Opened
Dino Scape 4D	Thinkwell Group, Universal Creative	6.6 feet (2.0 m)	Unknown	Polynesia	2000 (Closed in 2022)
Street Mission	Sally Corp, ETF Ride Systems	Unknown	Unknown	SésamoAventura	2019

== Ferrari Land ==
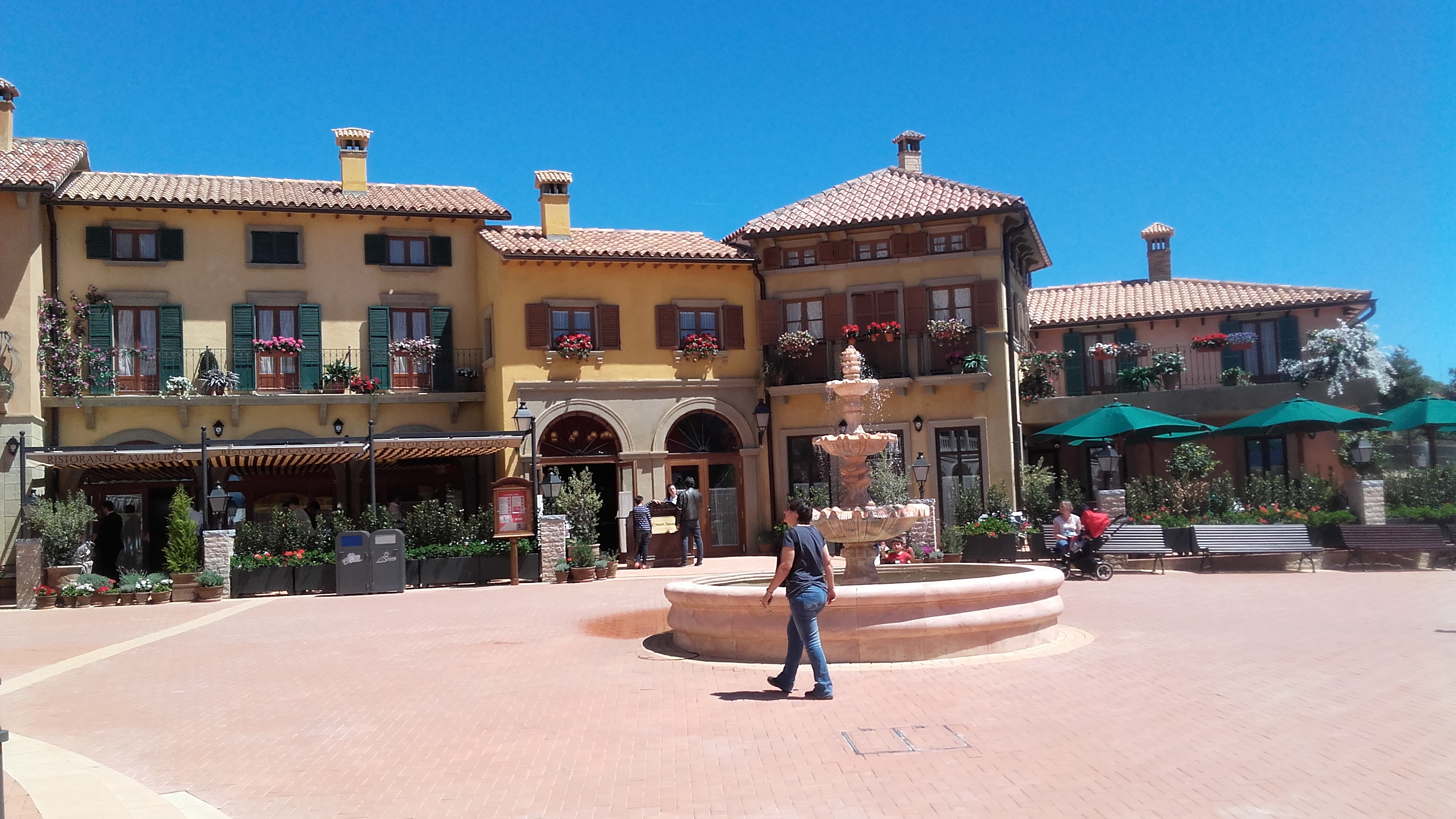
Italian village, Ferrari Land

InvestIndustrial and Ferrari signed a deal to build a new area themed to the Italian sports car brand in the PortAventura resort covering 60,000 m^{2}, including new rides, restaurants, shops and car racing simulators. Ferrari Land is the resort's second theme park, separate from PortAventura Park. The park was opened on 7 April 2017, after an investment of more than €100 million.

Its entrance is adjacent to PortAventura Park's main entrance. The Mediterranean theme is common to both entrances, as Ferrari Land is inspired by Italy, including recreations of Venice's Piazza San Marco and Rome's Colosseum. The main ride of Ferrari Land is Red Force, a 112 m tall vertical accelerator coaster that surpassed Shambhala as the tallest coaster in Europe and is also the fastest coaster in Europe. Ferrari Land opened a kids area in 2018.

Ferrari Land is the second amusement centre themed to Ferrari in the world, after Ferrari World Abu Dhabi.

=== Rides ===
Name	Manufacturer	Speed	Height	Length	Type	Opened
Junior Red Force	SBF Visa Group	28 miles per hour (45 km/h)	Unknown	Unknown	Rollercoaster	2018
Red Force	Intamin	112 miles per hour (180 km/h)	367 feet (112 m)	2,887 feet (880 m)	Rollercoaster	2017
Maranello Grand Race	C&S	Unknown	Unknown	1,870 feet (570 m)	Flat ride	2017
Thrill Towers	S&S Worldwide	Unknown	Unknown	Unknown	Flat ride	2017
Flying Dreams	Brogent Technologies	Unknown	Unknown	Unknown	Simulator	2017
Racing Legends	Simworx	Unknown	Unknown	Unknown	Simulator	2017

== PortAventura Caribe Aquatic Park ==
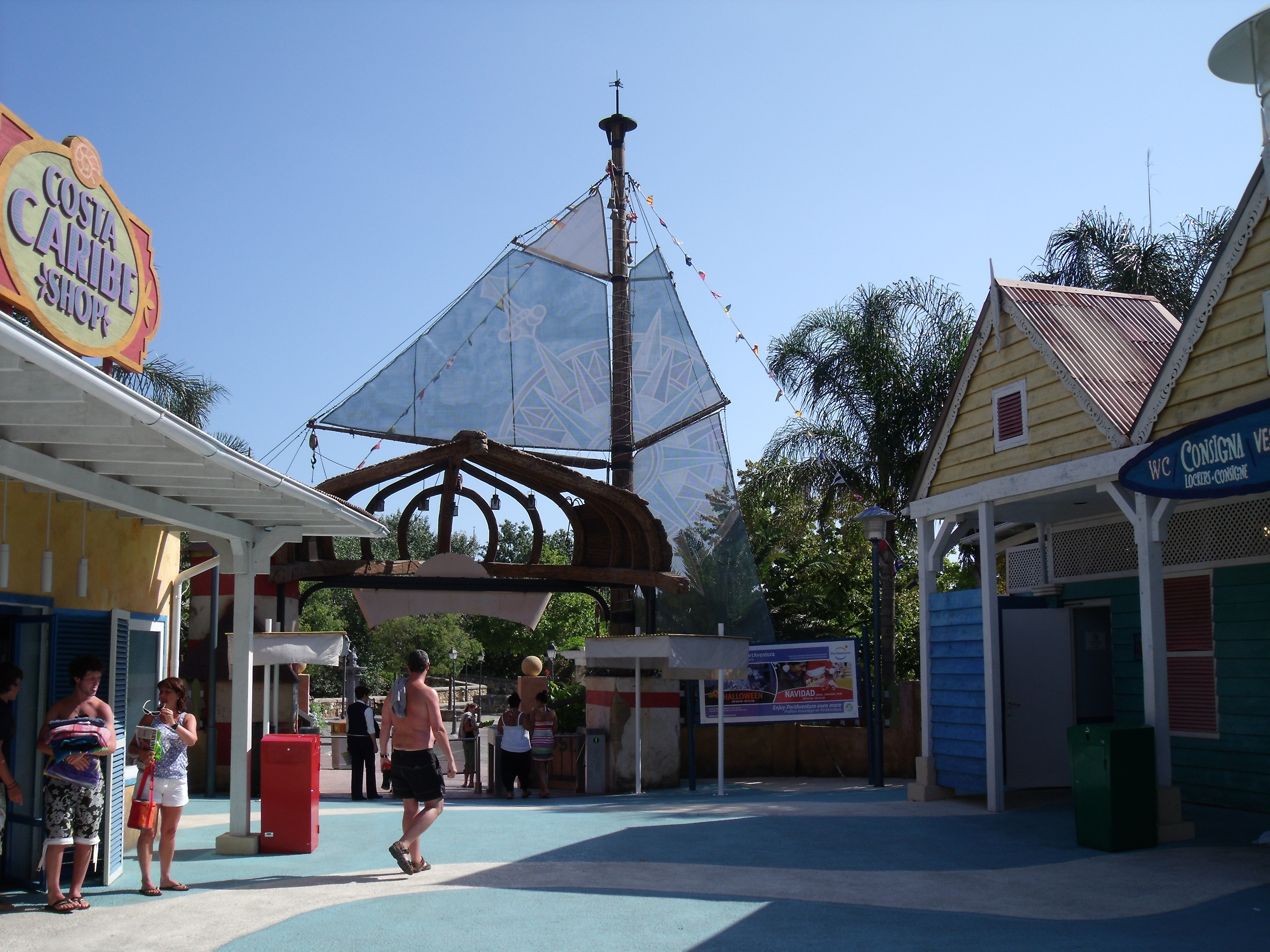
Costa Caribe Aquatic Park entrance

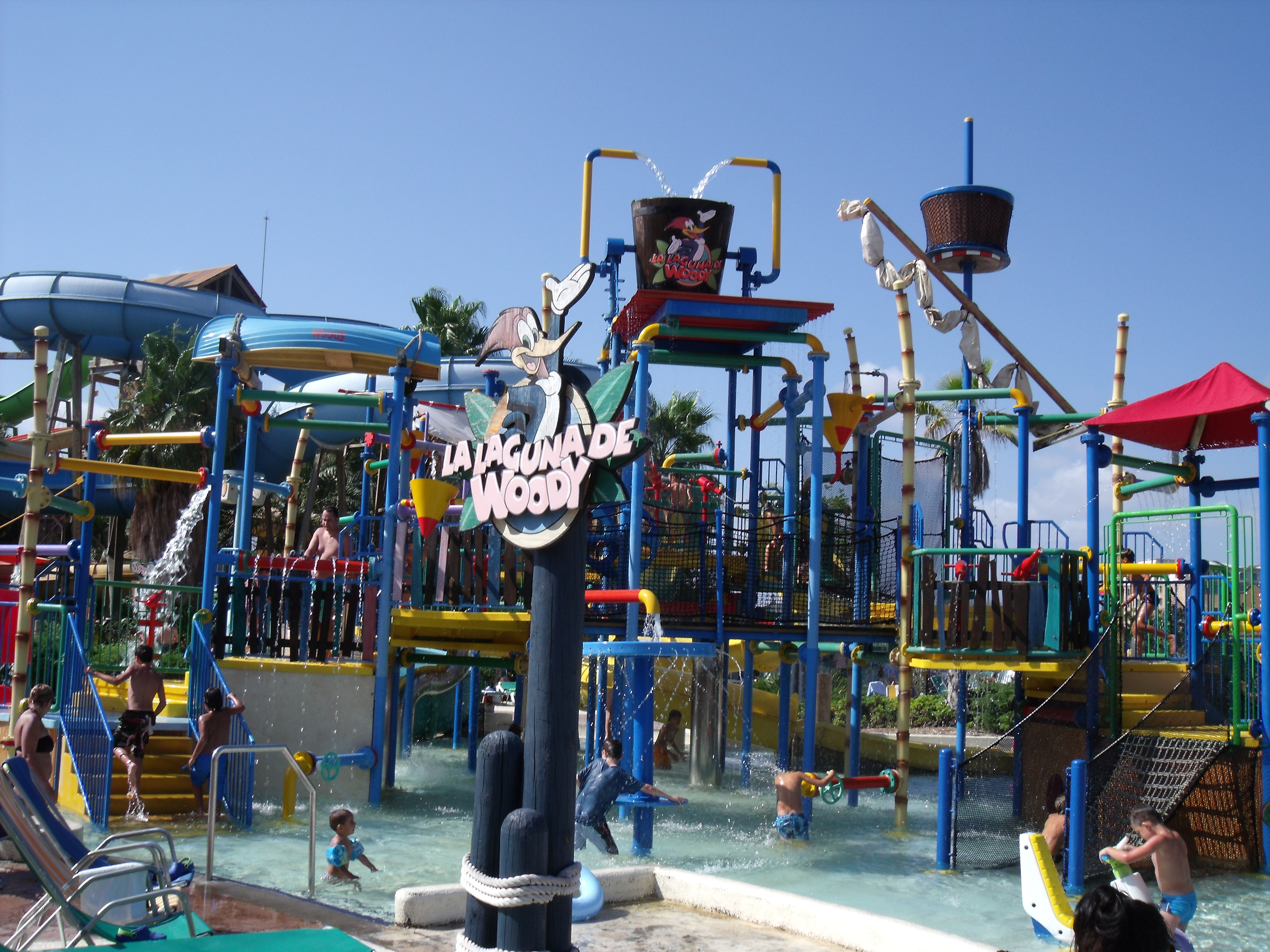
Costa Caribe Aquatic Park – La Laguna de Woody

PortAventura Caribe Aquatic Park is a water park which is adjacent to PortAventura Park. It has an area of 50,000 m2, which includes 16 attractions and slides, as well as over 8,500 m2 of water-covered surface area. It is themed to the Caribbean, with beaches, palm trees, and Latin and reggae music, and it also includes shops and restaurants.

=== Rides ===
- King Khajuna – Europe's tallest free-fall slide of 31 meters and 55-degree descent by ProSlide. Opened in 2013.
- Ciclón Tropical – MultiBUMP slide by ProSlide opened in 2013.
- Rapid Race – ProSlide ProRacer opened in 2013.
- The Mambo and Limbo – Two corkscrew waterslides by ProSlide. Opened in 2002.
- El Tifón – Two ProSlide body waterslides opened in 2002.
- El Río Loco – Lazy River opened in 2002.
- El Torrente – A ProSlide Mammoth river with four-passenger round tubes, opened in 2002.
- Barracudas – A pair of ProSlide tube chutes with two-passenger inline tubes, opened in 2002.

=== Kids rides ===
- Zona Indoor with Junior Slides – Indoor play area including pool and slides by WhiteWater West. Opened in 2002.
- La Laguna de Woody – Woody Woodpecker-themed play area by WhiteWater West. Opened in 2002.

== Resort hotels ==
The resort features six themed hotels:

- PortAventura Hotel PortAventura: Mediterranean theme (4*)
- PortAventura Hotel Caribe: Caribbean theme (4*)
- PortAventura Hotel El Paso: Mexican theme (4*)
- PortAventura Hotel Gold River (including 'The Callaghan's'): Western theme (4*)
- PortAventura Hotel Colorado Creek: Rustic Western theme (4*)
- PortAventura Hotel Mansión de Lucy: Victorian-style Western theme (5*)

The resort also features four off-property hotels operated under their own brand, Ponient Hotels, which also include free-transfers to the park. These are:

- Ponient Vila Centric by PortAventura World (4*)
- Ponient Píramide Salou by PortAventura World (4*)
- Ponient Dorada Palace by PortAventura World (4*)
- Ponient Marinada by PortAventura World (4*)

== Seasonal events ==
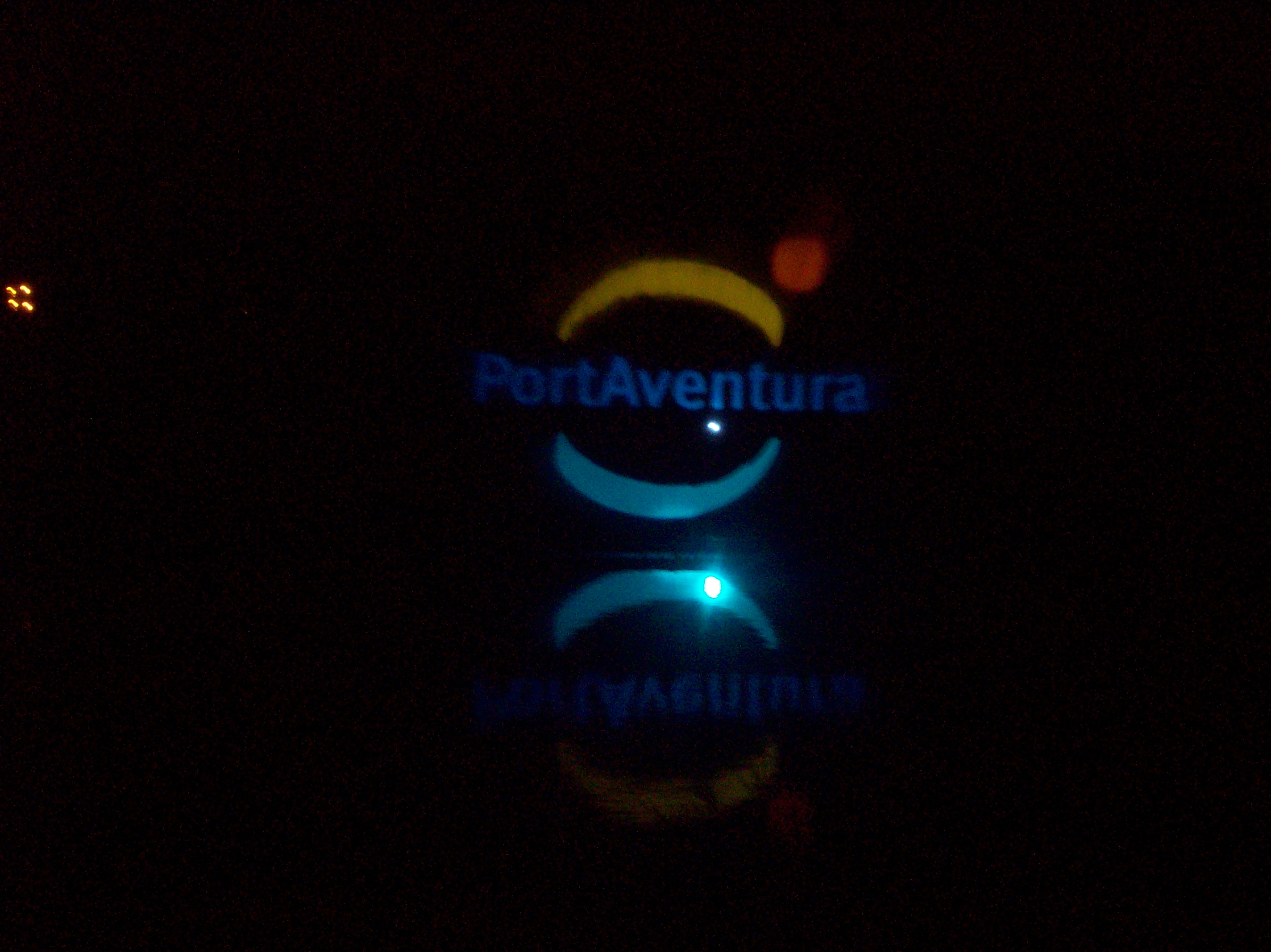
FiestAventura

During seasonal events like summer nights, Halloween (September to November) and Christmas (November to January), PortAventura Park opens seasonal walk around rides or shows, including the mazes: [REC], Horror in Penitence, La Selva del Miedo and the nighttime Halloween show Horror en el Lago.

Some events

Summer

- Dance Revolution – At the Gran Teatro Imperial Theatre
- PortAventura Parade – A parade with music and choreography, leading up to the start of the FiestAventura show
- FiestAventura – The fireworks show including water effects and floats

Halloween

- Halloween Kingdom – At the Gran Teatro Imperial Theatre
- [REC] Experience – Passage of terror
- Horror in Penitence – Passage of terror
- La Selva del Miedo – Passage of terror
- Halloween Parade – A parade with music and choreography of the most terrifying monsters at the park, leading up to the start of the Horror en el Lago show
- Horror en el Lago – The fireworks show including water effects and floats

Christmas

- PortAventura Christmas World – At the Gran Teatro Imperial Theatre
- Cuento de Navidad – Magnificent artistic and acrobatic display with international ice-skaters
- Christmas Family Festival – A family area only for Christmas
- Christmas Parade – A parade with music and choreography full of Christmas lights and carriages, leading up to the start of the La llegada de los Emisarios Reales
- La llegada de los Emisarios Reales – The Three Kings helpers arrive at the lake with a great multimedia firework show.

== See also ==
- Incidents at European amusement parks
