= PortAventura Park =

Theme park in Spain

- Previously known as * Port Aventura (1995-1998), * Universal's Port Aventura (1999), * Universal Studios Port Aventura (2000-2001) * Port Aventura (2002-2004)
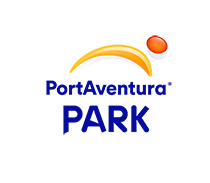
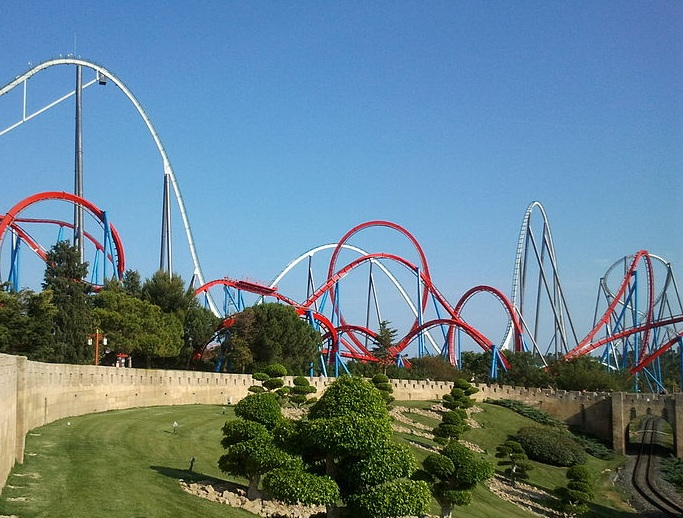
- Shambhala and Dragon Khan roller coasters
- Interactive map of PortAventura Park
- Location: PortAventura World, Salou and Vila-seca, Catalonia, Spain
- Coordinates: 41.087714°N 1.157668°E
- Opened: May 1, 1995; 31 years ago
- Owner: InvestIndustrial (50.1%); KKR (49.1%)
- Operated by: InvestIndustrial
- General manager: Sergio Feder
- Theme: Adventure, exoticism and Sesame Street
- Slogan: Vive el momento Un mundo de experiencias únicas Made to remember
- Operating season: Spring through winter
- Attendance: 3.8 million
- Area: 52 ha (theme park); 128.5 acres

Attractions
- Total: 38
- Roller coasters: 7
- Water rides: 5
- Website: Official website

PortAventura Park is a theme park located in the PortAventura World Resort, 85 kilometres (53 mi) southwest of Barcelona, Catalonia, Spain, in the municipalities of Salou and Vila-seca, on the Costa Daurada. The park opened on 1 May 1995 under the management of the Tussauds Group which had a 40.01% share in the park, La Caixa (33.19%), Anheuser-Busch (19.9%) and FECSA (6.7%). It opened to the general public on 2 May 1995.

== History ==
Anheuser-Busch and Grand Tibidabo, S.A., owners of Tibidabo Amusement Park, in Barcelona, along with other Spanish investors, made plans to build a 'Tibi Gardens' outside of Barcelona, Spain, in the late 1980s. Busch Entertainment announced in November 1992 its joint venture with Grand Tibidabo to build this park with other adjunct developments. It was conceived by Busch Entertainment Corporation. During construction, Grand Tibidabo backed out, and investors from The Tussauds Group, La Caixa and FECSA stepped in. When it happens the Tussauds Group replaced them as investors, finished the development and became the first operators. The park was renamed 'Port Aventura' and when it opened in 1995 in Salou, Tussauds Group had a 40,01% in the park while La Caixa had 33,19%, Anheuser-Busch had 19,9% and FECSA had 6,7%.

In 1995 and 1996, the park hosted 2.7 million visitors, making it the most visited theme park in Spain and the fifth in Europe. In 1997 Port Aventura has received 8 million visitors. In 1998 the majority of Tussauds Group'shares in the park were sold to Universal and the park was rebranded as 'Universal's Port Aventura', which made it the first Universal Studios Theme Park in Europe. The park was under the management of Universal Studios.

The park won a number of prestigious awards, including the 2000 Thea Award for Live Event for Fiestaventura and the 2003 Thea Award for Outstanding Achievement for Templo del Fuego.

In 2002, the area became a resort with the construction of two hotels and a water park. It was named 'Universal Mediterranea'. In 2004, NBCUniversal (Universal Studios' parent) sold all interest in PortAventura. It is owned and operated by La Caixa banking group's investment vehicle Criteria, but as of 2005 the Universal name has been dropped from the branding, and the resort was once again named 'PortAventura' (the space in the name is deliberately left out for trademark reasons). In December 2013 KKR purchased a 49.9% stake in PortAventura from Investindustrial that still owns 50.1%.

Annual visits
	2012	2013	2014	2015	2016	2017	2018	2019	2020
Visits to the parks	3,703,217	3,700,000	3,819,474	3,940,444	3,896,901	4,715,088	4,962,512	5,179,104	847,461
Visits to PortAventura Park	3,439,444		3,494,998	3,499,375	3,528,908	3,607,937	3,589,918	3,765,301	656,832
International visits	35%	38%	36%	33%	33%	33%	36%	36%	13%

== Areas ==
The park features five theme areas based on civilizations (Mediterrània, Far West, México, China and Polynesia), and one theme area based on Sesame Street, which was opened for the 2011 season of the park.

=== Mediterrània ===
Mediterrània is the main entrance area of the park. It features three rides but there are several restaurants and shops reproducing a typical coastal town in Catalonia.

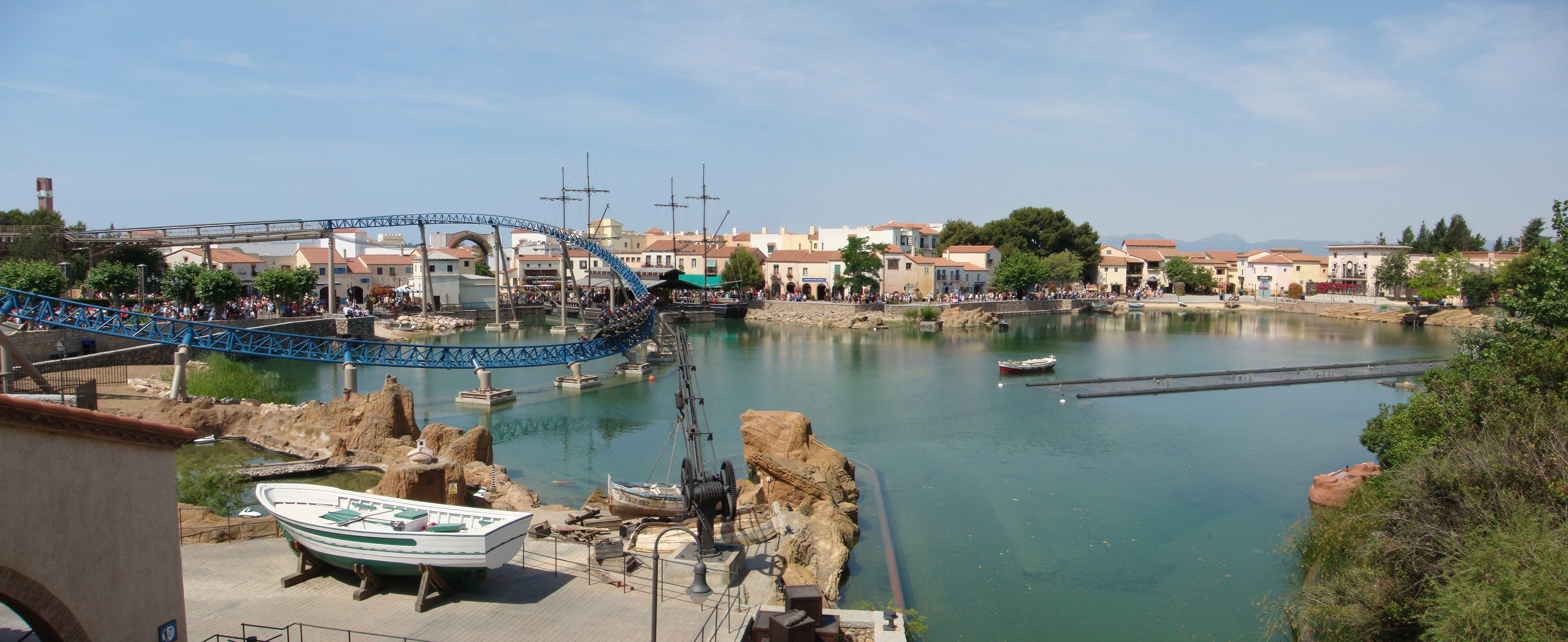
Mediterrània lake with Furius Baco

Attractions

- Furius Baco: An Intamin Accelerator Coaster with winged seating, which opened in June 2007. It has a top speed of 83.9 mph (135 km/h). The ride is themed along a hay-wire grape collecting machine, launched by a professor's pet monkey.
- Port de la Drassana: One of the boat ride station which takes visitors from the Mediterránia area to the Chinese area.
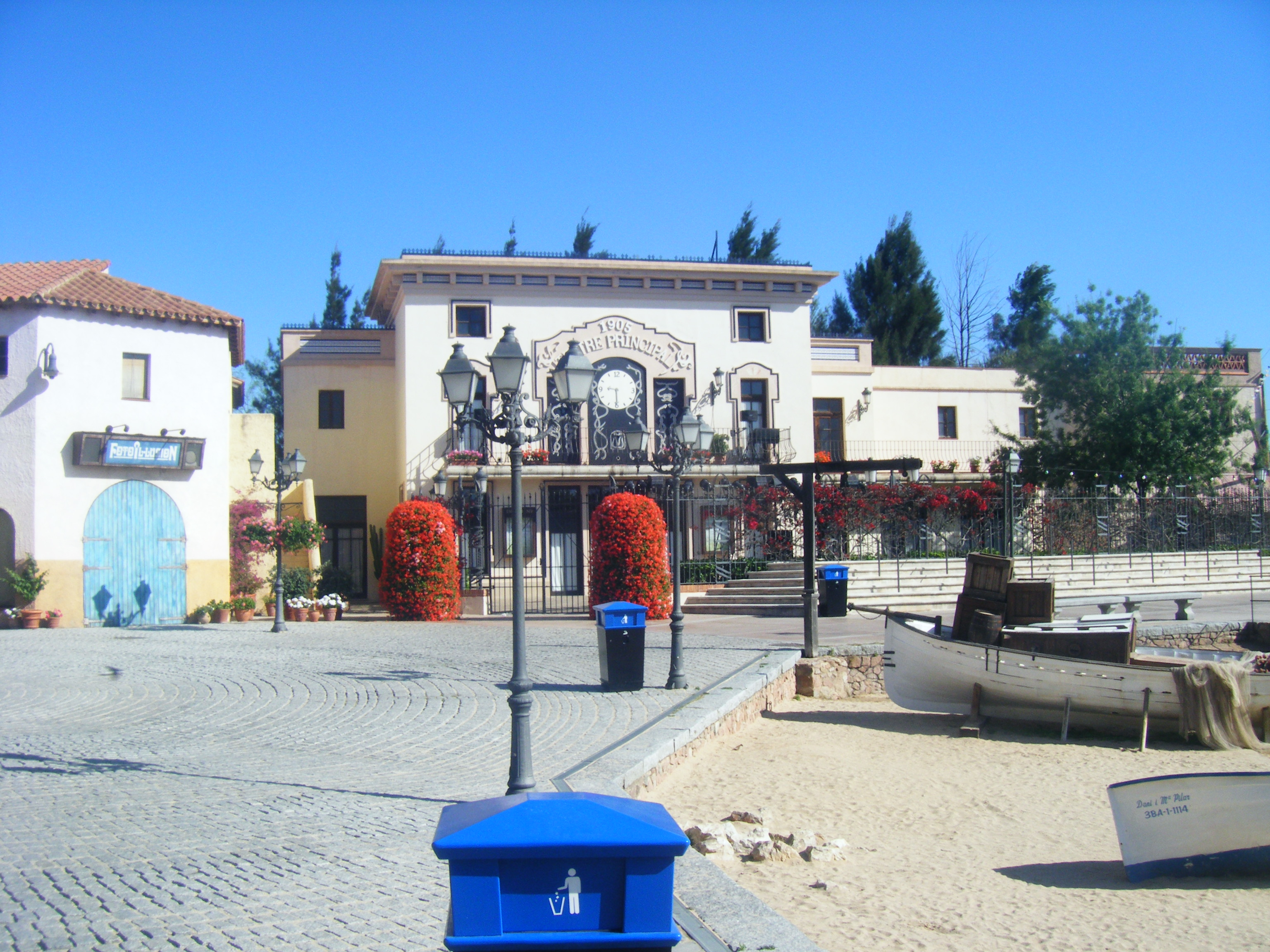
  The entrance zone of the Mediterrània section of PortAventura.
- Estació del Nord: One of the three stations of the 3 ft (914 mm) narrow-gauge Ferrocarril Tour, PortAventura's railroad attraction.

Shows

- Sésamo Parade
- Welcome
- FiestAventura: The lake becomes the site of a show featuring fireworks and floats representing PortAventura's zones of Polynesia, China, Far West and Mexico (only during July and August).
- Sésamo Parade Special Light (during July and August, also Halloween September to November).

=== Polynesia ===
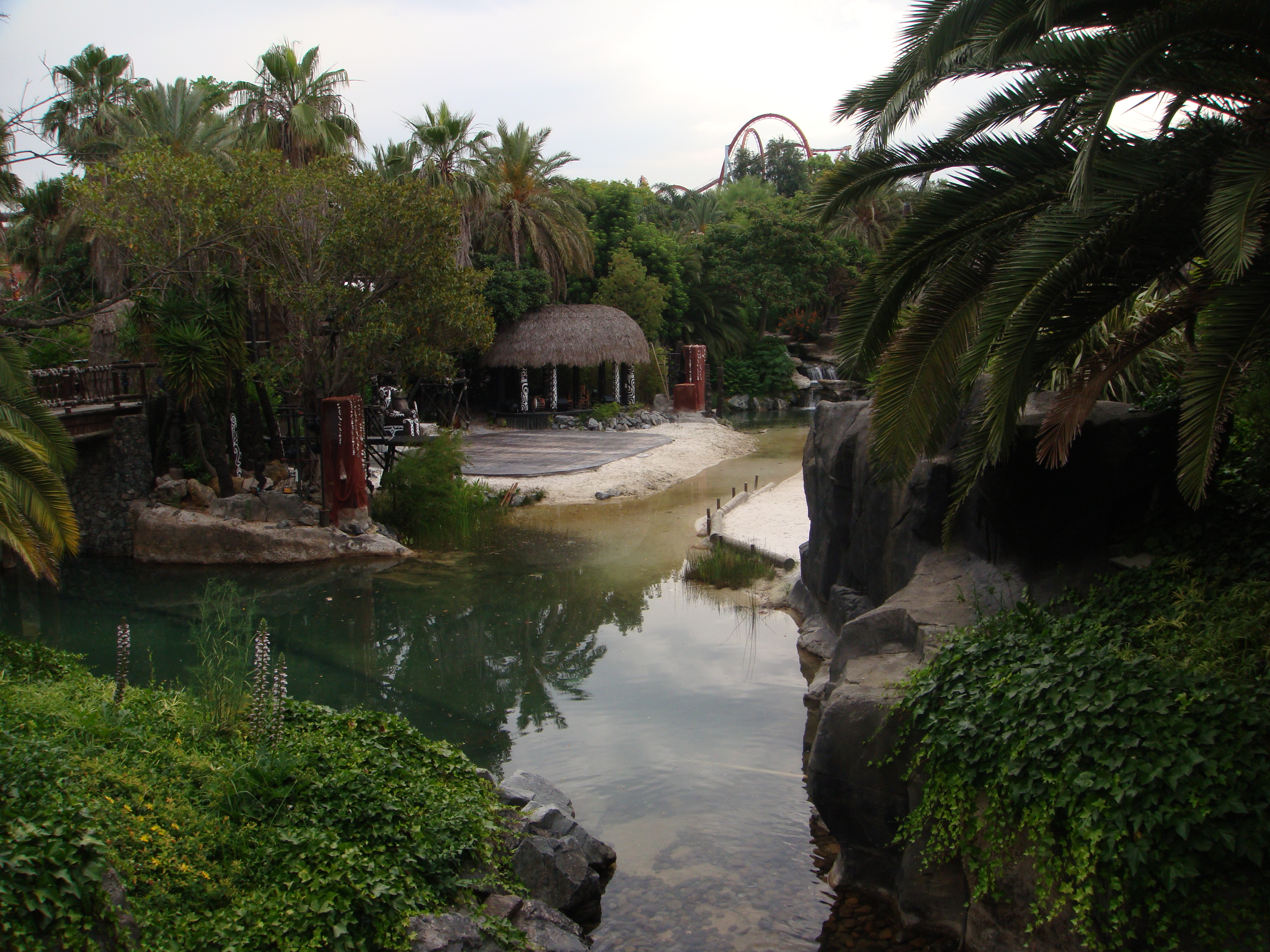
Polynesia area

The Polynesian area is different from the other rides in the park as it is a more laid back area with less thrilling rides. Polynesia is home to two shows and a few attractions. Polynesia is one of the smallest themed areas.

Attractions

- Tutuki Splash: A water ride themed along an erupting volcano, riders experience being shot out of a volcano in a flume style boat.
- Kontiki: A pirate ship ride.
- Canoes: A junior water ride.
- Makamanu Jungle: The Adventure Trek: Outdoor adventure trail opening summer 2026.

Removed attractions include:

- Tifon: A Waikiki Wave Flip ride. It opened with the park in 1995, and closed in 1998.
- Dino Escape 4D Experience: Built in 2000, five years after the opening of the park, riders are taken into a dynamic cinema themed as a submarine and taken on a journey to the bottom of the ocean. Labelled as a 4D theater attraction because of surround sound and motion platforms. Since 2010 it is able to play several different films throughout the day. There is a submarine over a pool as part of queue line theming. For the 2017 season, this has been rebranded as Dino Escape 4D Experience. The ride is based around a Jurassic Park Jeep journey which takes a turn for the worse, resulting in the need to escape from the dinosaurs on the loose.

=== SésamoAventura ===
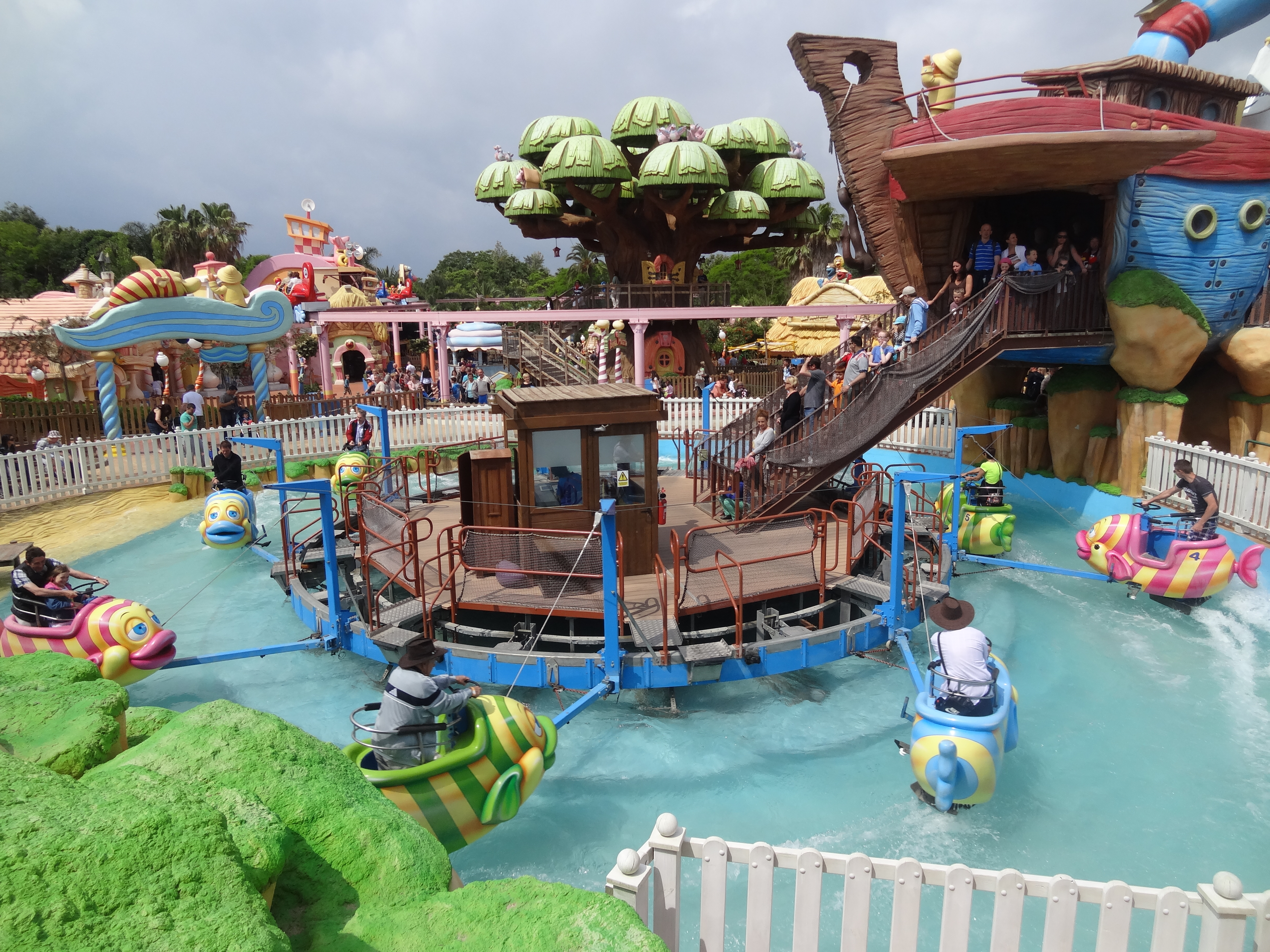
Magic Fish in the SésamoAventura area.

Themed to the Sesame Street characters, this area is aimed for the younger visitors of the park. It opened for the 2011 season, and it was built between China and Polynesia in former lands of the Polynesia area, maintaining some of its attractions. The investment was around €12 million. PortAventura joined Universal Studios Japan and Busch Gardens with an area dedicated to Sesame Street, being the only theme park in Europe.

It is home to 11 rides including:

- CocoPiloto – A monorail around the area.
- Tami Tami – A roller coaster for children.
- Magic Fish – A water carousel with jet-ski cars.
- El Salto de Blas – A drop-tower for children.
- La Granja de Elmo – A ride to visit Elmo's farm.
- SésamoAventura Station – One of the three stations of the Ferrocarril Tour, PortAventura's railroad attraction.
- Street Mission - An interactive shooter dark ride where guests help Detective Grover solve a mystery.

Removed attractions include:

- Loco Loco Tiki: A Zamperla Crazy Bus that opened when the area was still part of Polynesia, gaining an Oscar the Grouch theme when the new area opened.

The shows: It is also home to two shows and street animation starring Ernie, Bert, Elmo and company.

=== China ===
China is the biggest theme land of the park – The area includes a Chinese buffet called Marco Polo with a range of dishes available. The main path through the area is themed in the same style as the Great Wall of China.

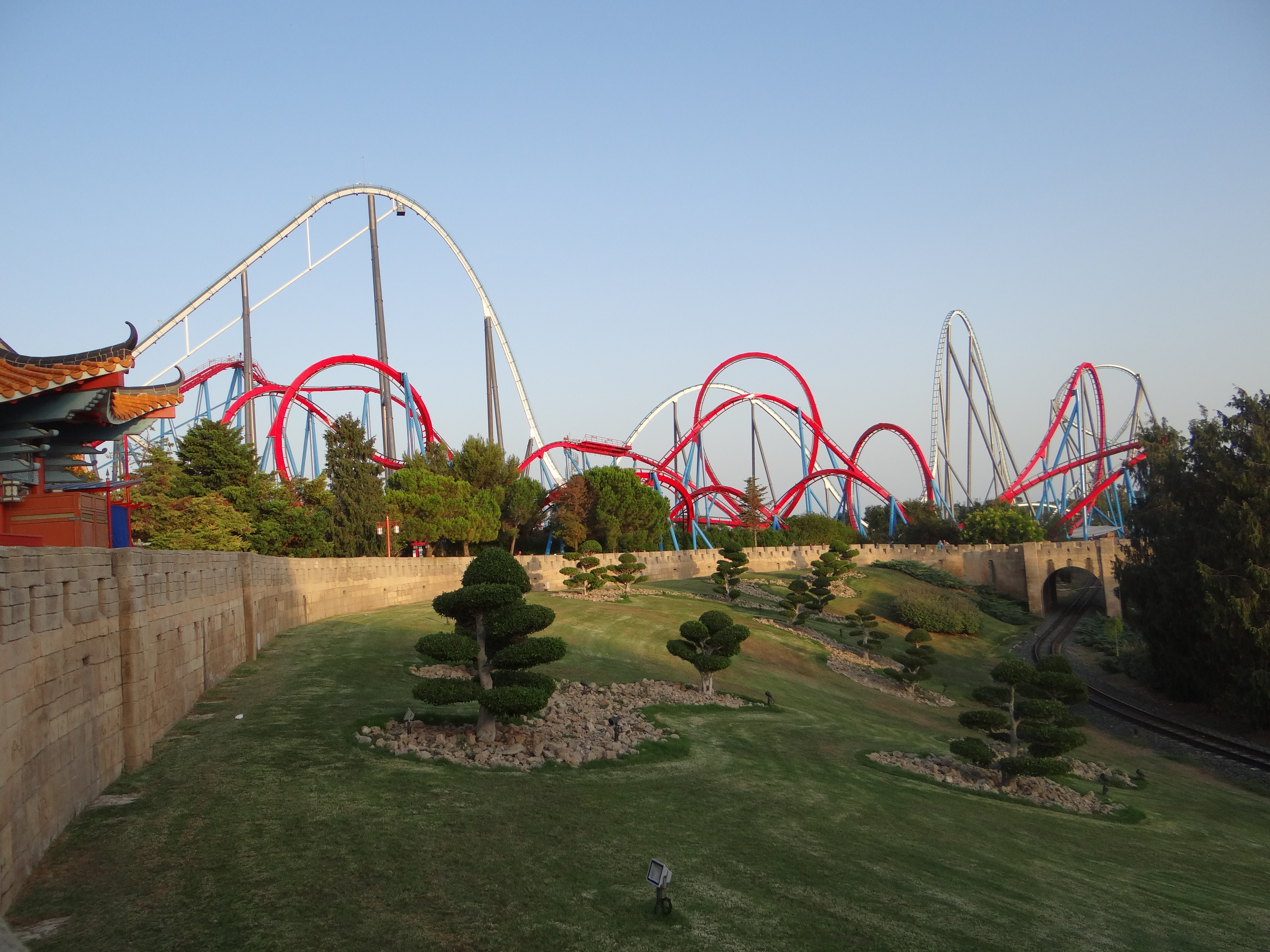
Dragon Khan and Shambhala from the Great Wall of China recreation in 2012

Attractions

- Dragon Khan, with 8 inversions this formerly held the record as having more inversions than any other roller coaster. It also held the world record for the tallest vertical loop on any roller-coaster. The ride built by Bolliger & Mabillard (B&M) opened on 2 May 1995 and was one of the two roller coasters that Port Aventura had when it opened. It consistently ranks among the world's best roller coasters in polls.
- Shambhala, this B&M hyper coaster beat three European records as it was the fastest (134 km/h) and tallest roller coaster in Europe. It is 76 m tall and had longest drop in Europe at 78 m (2 m underground).
- Angkor, a large splash battle themed in the Angkor ruins that opened in 2014. It is located just behind Shambhala.
- Cobra Imperial
- Tea Cups
- Driving School

Removed attractions include:

- Fumanchú: A Wave Swinger attraction that opened with the park, closing in 2012.

Shows

- Los Misterios de Angkor
- Generations Forever (This show has an entrance in the México zone).
- Bubblebou
- Sand Animation

=== México ===
This area is themed primarily on pre-Columbian Mexico. It features temples, statues and a Great Piramide that is the entrance to the Gran Teatro Maya, the biggest show zone of the park.

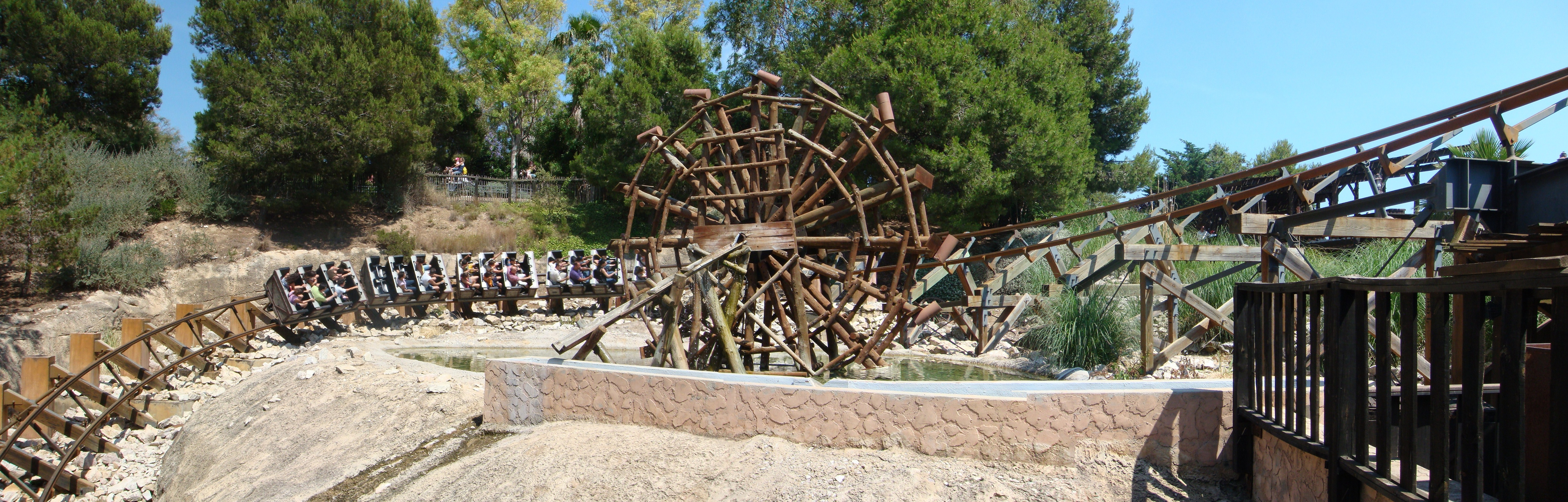
El Diablo-Tren de la Mina in the Mexican area.

Attractions

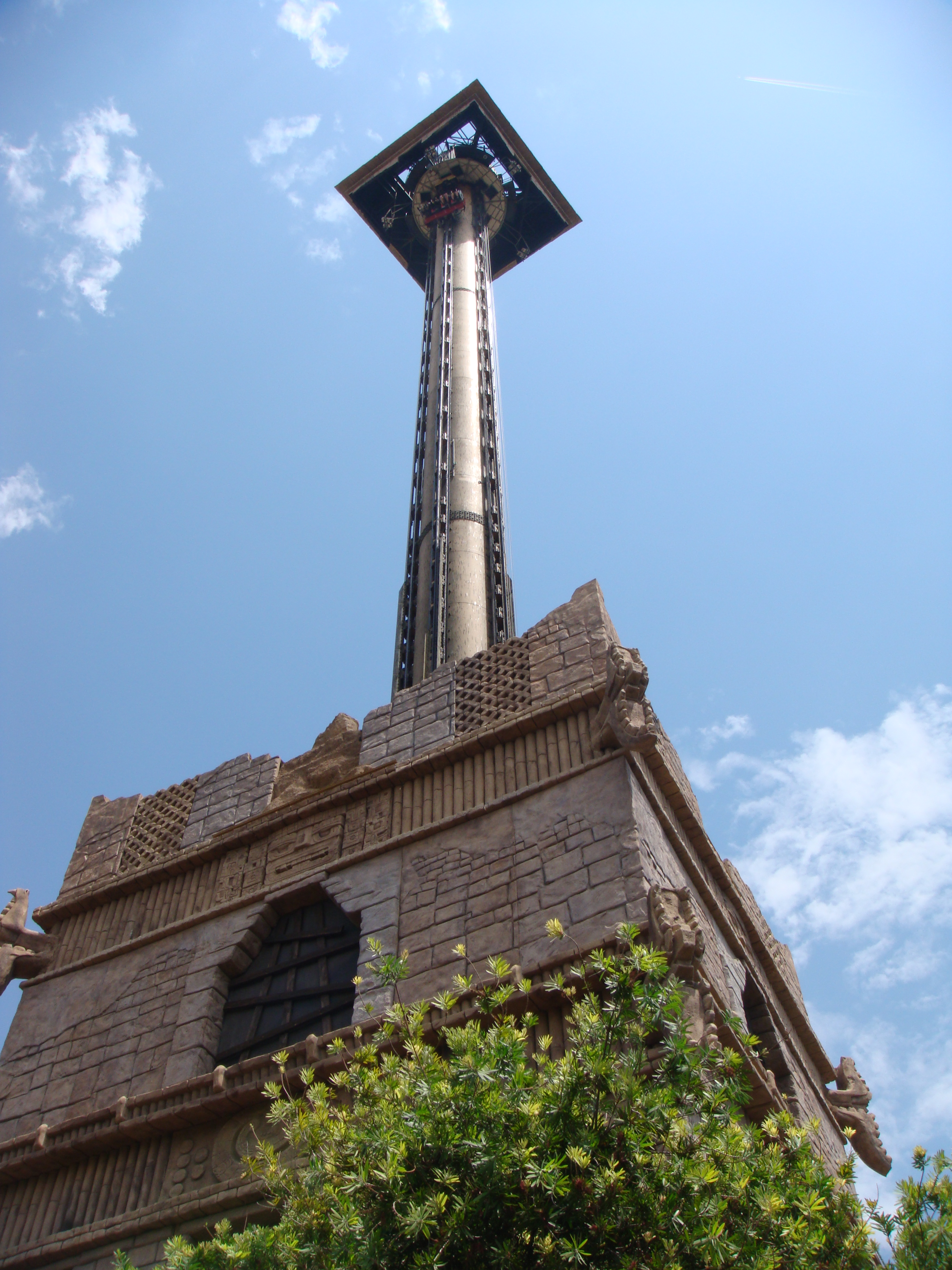
Hurakan Condor

- Hurakan Condor: An Intamin drop tower ride operated by a cable lift, the ride provides a large view at the top before riders are sent to free fall to the bottom of the ride. This ride is one of the tallest in the world at 330 ft and is sometimes labelled as the greatest due to the tilting seats.
- El Diablo - Tren de la Mina: An Arrow Dynamics mine train which features various small tunnels, a large number of helices and 3 chain-lift hills. The top speed of the coaster is around 60 km/h.
- El Secreto de los Mayas: A mirror maze with some visual effects.
- Yucatán: Themed in a large snake. It is a spinning ride that spins around a central axis with some ups and downs at a medium speed. It always travels forward.
- Armadillos: A children's version of Yucatán.
- Los Potrillos: A child attraction with some foals guided along a guide through a scouts camp.
- Serpiente Emplumada: A spinning ride with five cylindrical modules that spin around a central axis, rising and changing angle in respect to the ground at the same time as spinning around a central totem.

Removed attractions include:

- Trono de Pacal: A Rainbow ride that opened in 1995, closing in 2004.

Shows

- Templo del Fuego: Built in 2001, it is a walk-through attraction which runs every 30 minutes during certain periods of the park opening hours. This is themed as a Maya temple in which an Indiana Jones type character raids in search of treasure. The high level of pyrotechnics in this show is hinted in the name – Temple of Fire.
- Generation Forever (This show has an entrance in the China zone)
- Los Mundos de Woody

=== Far West ===
Themed to an old town of the American Wild West, this area features many western buildings and sculptures. The area boasts nine attractions which makes it the biggest area in the park. Other attractions in this area includes a wild west version of Breakdance ride and Dodgems.

The area is also home to these thrill rides:

- Stampida – This dueling wooden roller coaster is the third largest roller coaster in the park.
- Tomahawk – A junior version of Stampida and which runs parallel to it.
- Silver River Flume – A traditional water flume in the Far West.
- Grand Canyon Rapids – A whitewater "tub raft" adventure along the Grand Canyon. There are also water cannons next to this ride, which allow guests to squirt people on the rides
- Penitence Station – One of the three stations of the Ferrocarril Tour, PortAventura's railroad attraction.
- Uncharted: The Enigma of Penitence – A "storycoaster" ride based on the 2022 film.

== See also ==
- PortAventura World
