= Furius Baco =

Roller coaster

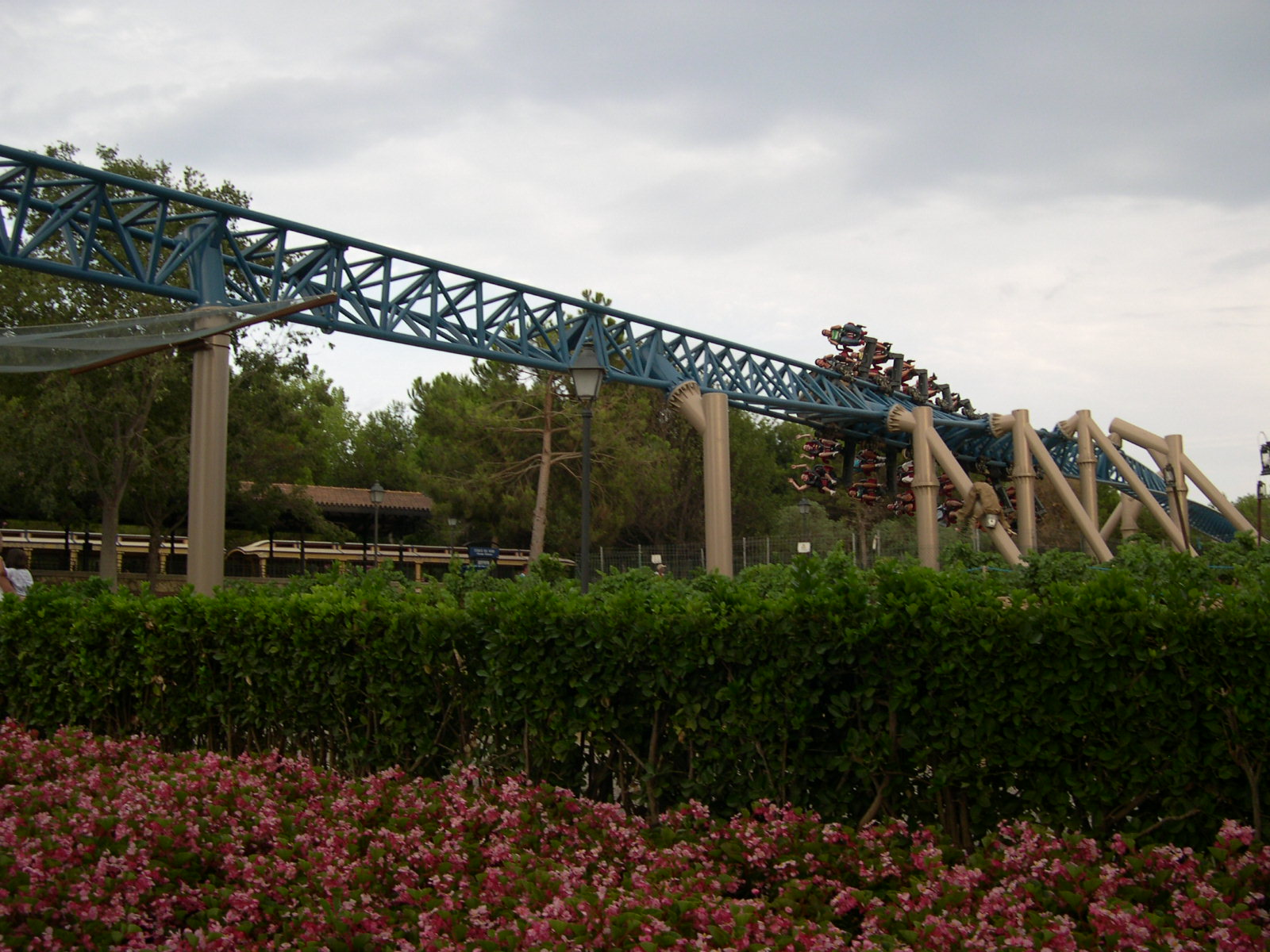
- One of Furius Baco's trains completing the ride's only inversion: an inline twist.

PortAventura Park
- Location: PortAventura Park
- Park section: Mediterrània
- Coordinates: 41°05′05″N 1°09′23″E
- Status: Operating
- Opening date: 5 June 2007
- Cost: €15,000,000

General statistics
- Type: Steel – Launched
- Manufacturer: Intamin
- Designer: Werner Stengel
- Model: Wing Rider Coaster Accelerator Coaster
- Lift/launch system: Hydraulic Launch
- Height: 46 ft (14 m)
- Length: 2,788.75 ft (850.01 m)
- Speed: 83.9 mph (135.0 km/h)
- Inversions: 1
- Duration: 0:55
- Acceleration: 0-83.9 mph (0-135 km/h) in 3.5 seconds
- G-force: 4.7
- Height restriction: 140–195 cm (4 ft 7 in – 6 ft 5 in)
- Trains: 3 trains with 6 cars; riders arranged 4 across in a single row for a total of 24 riders per train
- Furius Baco at RCDB

Furius Baco is a steel roller coaster featuring a hydraulic launch located at PortAventura Park in the resort PortAventura World, Salou, Catalonia, Spain. Manufactured by Intamin, the ride opened on 5 June 2007 as the fastest roller coaster in Europe at 135.0 kilometres per hour (83.9 mph), which the ride reaches in 3.5 seconds; this record has since been surpassed by Red Force at neighboring Ferrari Land.

== Description ==
Furius Baco stands 14 metres (46 ft) feet tall, is 850 metres (2,790 ft) long, lasts 55 seconds, and cost 15 million euros to build. It features several large turns, an inline twist, and a final turn over the lake. The ride also features Intamin's Wing Rider trains, a different seating arrangement to other hydraulically launched coasters built by the company, where the seats are attached to the side of the barrel themed trains. Each of the three trains have 6 cars, with two riders seated on each side of the track, allowing each train to hold 24 passengers.

== Ride experience ==
After being loaded with riders, trains slowly advance out of the station area and into the pre-show area, which is themed to a laboratory with whirling cogs and machinery. The sound of a bike bell goes off, cuing the entrance of the professors assistant, a monkey which cycles over the left hand side of the lab on a skybike. A video is shown revealing a machine which is supposed to collect grapes for wine, and the professor is seen climbing down a ladder and removing a large spanner out of his lab coat. The monkey appears to the left holding a lever whilst the professor adds the finishing touches to his machine. The professor then notices the monkey, and shouts "No, No!" However, the monkey pulls the lever, sending the professor flying into the cog machine; he is thrown around the laboratory, trapped in the cogs of the machine. At this point, the machine explodes, flooding the screen with wine. The cars then move forwards then back again, and on the screen the professor dives through the wine and then the ride launches to 135.0 kilometres per hour (83.9 mph) in 3.5 seconds up a small hill before navigating a series of tight turns and transitions through the vineyard and a tunnel. The ride then dives into an inline twist before dropping and twisting through a turn very close to the lake before rising up and going into the brake run where the monkey is hanging on the ceiling holding some grapes. Then the riders are let off the ride and into the shop where they can purchase an onride photo or a video of their ride.
