= Hurakan Condor =

Drop tower in PortAventura World

PortAventura Park
- Area: México
- Coordinates: 41.089882°N 1.158953°E
- Status: Operating
- Opening date: 2005

Ride statistics
- Attraction type: Giant Drop Tower
- Manufacturer: Intamin
- Model: Giant Drop
- Height: 377 ft (115 m)
- Drop: 285 ft (87 m)
- Speed: 71 mph (114 km/h)
- Capacity: 1000 riders per hour
- Vehicles: 5
- Riders per vehicle: 4
- Height restriction: 140 to 195 cm (4 ft 7 in to 6 ft 5 in)

Hurakan Condor is a "giant drop" tower attraction located at PortAventura Park in Salou, Catalonia, Spain. Manufactured by the Swiss firm Intamin, the ride stands as one of the tallest drop towers in the world, with a central lattice structure reaching a height of 377 feet (115 m).

== Ride experience ==
The attraction features five independent gondolas arranged around a central column. Following the pioneering model established by Apocalypse at Drayton Manor, Hurakan Condor offers various riding configurations, including:

- Sit-down: Traditional seated gondolas.
- Stand-up: Riders remain in a vertical standing position throughout the ascent and drop.
- Tilting Stand-up: A variation where the seats tilt forward approximately 15 degrees at the summit, just before the release, to increase the sensation of height.

The ascent concludes as the ride vehicles reach a maximum drop height of 285 feet (87 m). In the final meters of the climb, specific gondolas utilise a tilting mechanism that angles riders forward, enhancing the sensation of exposure. Upon reaching the summit, a magnetic coupler detaches, initiating a free fall that reaches top speeds of 71.46 mph (115 km/h). This descent is synchronized with an on-ride photo system that captures passengers at the moment of release.

== Theme ==
The attraction and its queueing areas are extensively themed to reflect a Mexican aesthetic, ensuring architectural and atmospheric consistency with the Mexico section of PortAventura Park. The station and surrounding structures incorporate elements inspired by Maya ruins and colonial Mexican design, featuring weathered stone textures, tropical vegetation, and traditional iconography.

The base of the ride

== See also ==
- Drop tower
