= Shambhala (roller coaster) =

Steel hyper coaster at PortAventura Park, Spain

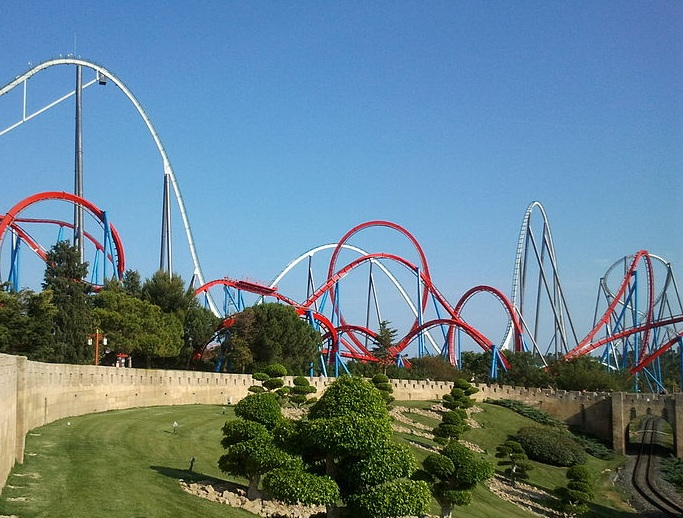
- Shambhala (white) and Dragon Khan (red)

PortAventura Park
- Location: PortAventura Park
- Park section: China
- Coordinates: 41°05′05″N 1°09′23″E
- Status: Operating
- Opening date: 12 May 2012

General statistics
- Type: Steel – Twister
- Manufacturer: Bolliger & Mabillard
- Model: Hyper Coaster
- Lift/launch system: Chain lift hill
- Height: 76 m (249 ft)
- Drop: 78 m (256 ft)
- Length: 1,564 m (5,131 ft)
- Speed: 134 km/h (83 mph)
- Inversions: 0
- Duration: 3:00
- Max vertical angle: 77.4°
- Capacity: 1,680 riders per hour
- G-force: 3.8
- Height restriction: 140 cm (4 ft 7 in)
- Trains: 3 trains with 8 cars; riders arranged 2 across in 2 rows for a total of 32 riders per train
- Shambhala at RCDB

Shambhala: Expedición al Himalaya is a steel hypercoaster located at PortAventura Park in Salou and Vila-seca, Spain. Manufactured by Bolliger & Mabillard, it was the tallest (76 metres (249 ft)) and second fastest (134 kilometres per hour (83 mph)) roller coaster in Europe at the time of its opening. The height and speed records were beaten in April 2017 by Red Force (with a height of 112 metres (367 ft)), which was also opened in PortAventura World in its new theme park Ferrari Land. Among coasters with a lift hill, the height and speed records were beaten in July 2018, when Hyperion opened at Energylandia in Poland. Shambhala is named and themed after the inaccessible land in the Himalayas: Shambhala. The coaster was announced on 24 October 2011, and opened to the public on 12 May 2012.

== History ==
Rumors that PortAventura World would be investing in a new Bolliger & Mabillard Dive Coaster emerged in late 2010. In May 2011, speculation that the park was planning to build a hypercoaster that would pass over Dragon Khan arose. Land clearing began in the summer of 2011. Shambhala was announced to the public on 24 October 2011; the layout of the roller coaster was leaked 2 days earlier. The last piece of track was installed in mid-April 2012 following a signing event and the placement of several country flags on the track. Testing of the ride began in the same month. Following the completion of testing, a ribbon cutting ceremony was held on 12 May 2012 before opening to the public the same day. Over 300 workers from countries including Germany, France, Hungary, Poland, Switzerland, and United States took part in the construction of Shambhala.

At the time of opening, the roller coaster held records for tallest, longest drop, and fastest hypercoaster in Europe, though all three records have since been surpassed by Hyperion at Energylandia. These records were held by Silver Star at Europa-Park prior to Shambhala's opening.

In September 2019, a video showing a rider catching a phone dropped by a rider a few rows ahead went viral.

== Ride experience ==
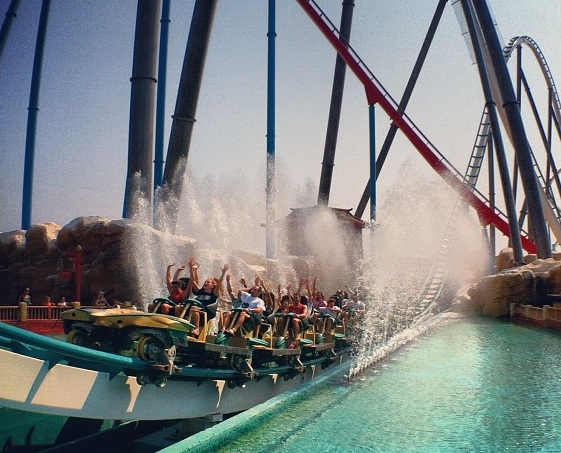
Shambhala's splashdown

After departing from the station, the train makes a 90 degree turn to the right, then begins to climb the 76-metre (249 ft) tall chain lift hill. Once the train reaches the top of the lift, the train drops back down to the ground at a 77.4 degree angle reaching speeds of up to 134 kilometres per hour (83 mph) as it passes through a tunnel and races past the drop off Dragon Khan's midcourse brakes. Following the first drop, the train then makes a slight left turn into the first of five camelback hills before dropping again and entering a figure-8-like helix, also known as an ampersand turn. On the return trip, the train goes over a very small hill (speed hill); at the same time, passing through a trim brake which isn't activated. Immediately after, the train enters the second camelback hill, followed by a slight left turn, then crossing under Dragon Khan's first drop to enter a splashdown element. Unlike other coasters featuring a splashdown (Diamondback, Sheikra, Griffon, etc.), Shambhala's train never hits the water. The splash is created by a series of water jets that shoot up when the train passes, creating the splashdown effect. The splashdown is followed by another set of camelback hills. Following these hills, the train passes through the mid-course brake run. Finally, after making a banked downward left turn, the train passes over the final hill before entering the final brake run leading directly back to the station where the next riders board. One cycle of the ride lasts about three minutes.

== Characteristics ==
Video of Shambhala's first drop

=== Trains ===
Shambhala operates with three steel and fiberglass trains. Each train has eight cars with two rows that seat two riders each for a total of 32 riders per train; each seat has its own individual lap-bar restraint. This configuration allows the ride to achieve a theoretical hourly capacity of 1,680 riders per hour. Riders also experience up to 3.8 times the force of gravity. The structure of the trains are colored gold and cyan, the lap bar restraints are cyan, and the seats are black. The trains are equipped with video cameras for each row of two riders, allowing riders to purchase recordings after the ride ("videoride").

=== Track ===
The steel track of Shambhala is approximately 1,564 metres (5,131 ft) long, the height of the lift is 76 metres (249 ft), and covers an area of about 14,000 m^{2}. The roller coaster has no inversions though it does feature five camelback hills, each at least 20 metres (66 ft) tall, a splashdown, and inclined figure eight element.

Including the supports, the total weight of the roller coaster is approximately 1,600 tonnes (1,600 long tons; 1,800 short tons). 4,000 m^{3} of cement was used for the foundations that hold up the supports and some are as deep as 18 metres (59 ft). The track is white with cyan rails while the supports are grey.

=== Theme ===
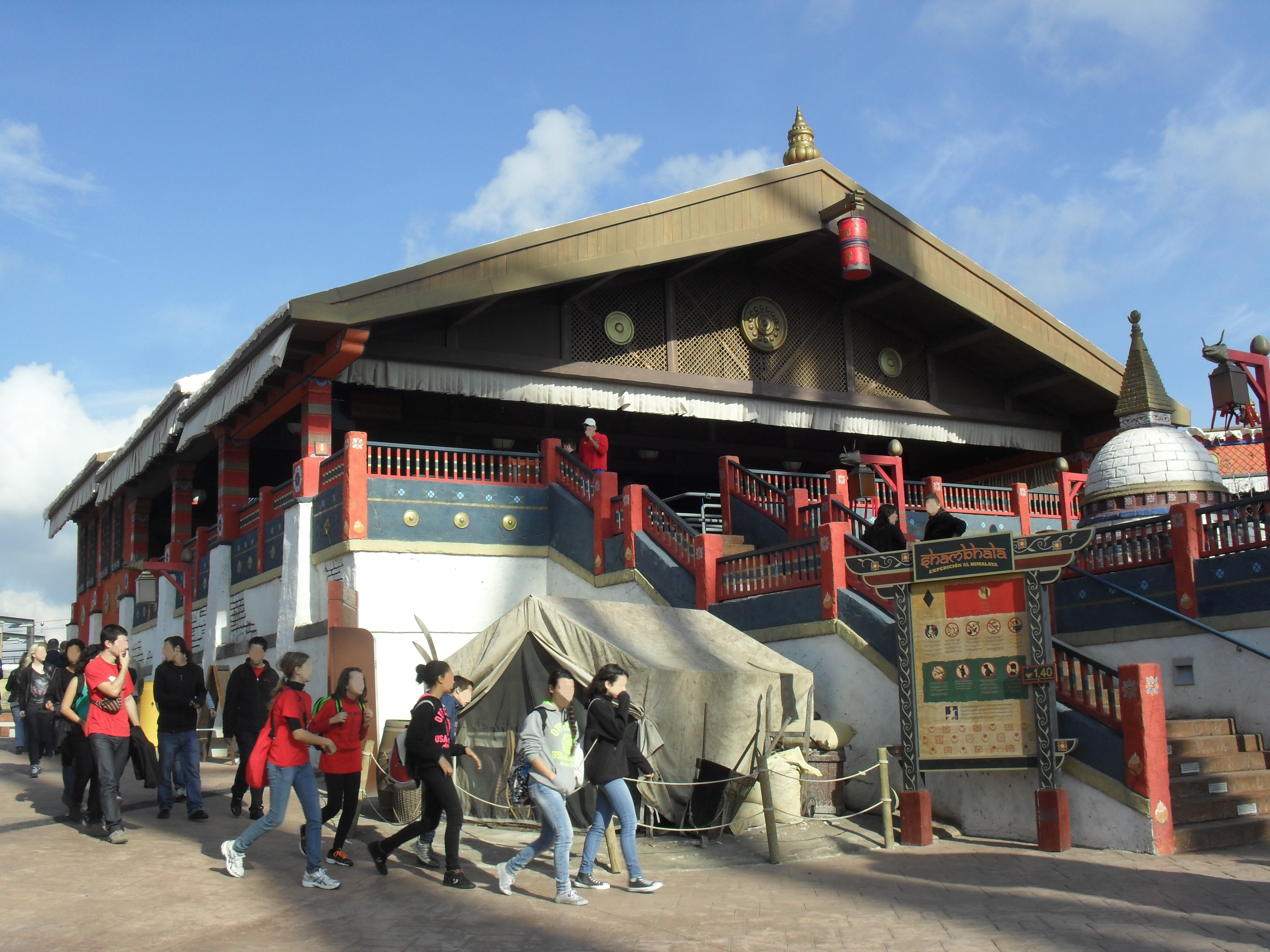
Shambhala's station

Inspired by both Nicholas Roerich stories and the Kingdom of Bhutan, Shambhala is named and themed around the story that within the Himalayas there is a lost world (Shambhala) that is impossible to access and is the source of happiness. As guests walk through the themed queue and board the train, they go on an expedition to find this land.

The roller coaster is located in the China section of PortAventura Park.

== Reception ==
Following the opening of Shambhala, Kirmes & Parks magazine named the roller coaster as the best European attraction introduced in 2012. Patrick Purcell from Mirror said that the roller coaster lived up to its hype and that, "It is also one of the smoothest roller coasters I've encountered." Sophie Castle from Travel Channel UK praised the height of Shambhala and said that, "Shambhala is definitely an opportunity that shouldn't be missed." In 2013, Shambhala was featured on Travel Channel's television series Insane Coaster Wars: World Domination.

The ride appeared in Amusement Today's Golden Ticket Awards for the first time in 2018, ranking 45th in the top steel roller coasters category.

Golden Ticket Awards: Top steel Roller Coasters
| Year | | | | | | | | | 1998 | 1999 |
|---|---|---|---|---|---|---|---|---|---|---|
| Ranking | | | | | | | | | – | – |
| Year | 2000 | 2001 | 2002 | 2003 | 2004 | 2005 | 2006 | 2007 | 2008 | 2009 |
| Ranking | – | – | – | – | – | – | – | – | – | – |
| Year | 2010 | 2011 | 2012 | 2013 | 2014 | 2015 | 2016 | 2017 | 2018 | 2019 |
| Ranking | – | – | – | – | – | – | – | – | 45 | – |
| Year | 2020 | 2021 | 2022 | 2023 | 2024 | 2025 | 2026 | | | |
| Ranking | N/A | – | 49 | – | – | – | – | | | |

== See also ==
- 2012 in amusement parks
