= Red Force =

Red Force or Red force may refer to

- Red Force FC, an amateur soccer team based in Miami, Florida
- Red team, also known as a red force, an independent group that challenges an organization to improve its effectiveness
- Red Force (roller coaster), a roller coaster at the Ferrari Land theme park in Tarragona, Spain
