= The Tussauds Group =

Defunct entertainment company

- Company type: Limited company
- Industry: Entertainment
- Founded: 1926 (as a limited company)
- Defunct: 2007
- Fate: Merged into Merlin Entertainment
- Headquarters: Poole, Dorset, England
- Owners: S. Pearson & Son (1978–1999); Charterhouse Development Capital (1999–2005); Dubai International Capital (2005–2007)

The Tussauds Group was a visitor attractions company based in London, United Kingdom. Its portfolio of attractions included the Madame Tussauds waxworks, Heide Park Resort in Germany, The London Eye, Warwick Castle, Alton Towers, Thorpe Park, and Chessington World of Adventures.

The company was purchased by The Blackstone Group and merged with Merlin Entertainments in 2007.

== History ==
=== The 1700s ===
The physician, Philippe Curtius began to create organs and biological structures from wax. After creating organs, Curtius went on to recreate notable people in society out of the medium too. Curtius put these models on display to the public in Berne, Switzerland where they caught the attention of the French royal family. In 1765, the royal family invited Curtius to display his exhibits in Paris. When moving to Paris, Curtius bought with him a housekeeper and her daughter, Marie Grosholtz, who Curtius then took on as an apprentice of his work.

Under Curtius’ teaching, Marie became renowned for her modelling, completing portraits of Jean-Jacques Rousseau and Voltaire. This led to Marie being invited to the royal court at Versailles where she was employed as a teacher. In 1795, Marie married François Tussaud with whom she had two sons. After the French Revolution in 1789, Marie continued her modelling and made death masks of her deceased ex-employers. Upon the death of Curtius in 1794, Marie inherited his estate, including his properties and his workshop.

=== The 1800s ===
Overseas interest in the French Revolution led Marie Tussaud to travel to England and display her work there. Tussaud travelled the British Isles with her work as she was prevented from returning to France due to the war between Britain and France. After travelling with her models, Tussauds bought her first property in London's Baker Street in 1835, for the purpose of displaying her wax figures. The large property allowed her to display the exhibits that she used on tour as well as create new models and exhibitions. Marie Tussaud died in 1850 and the business was left to her two sons. Her grandchildren then moved the business to a permanent residence in Marylebone Road.

=== The 1900s ===
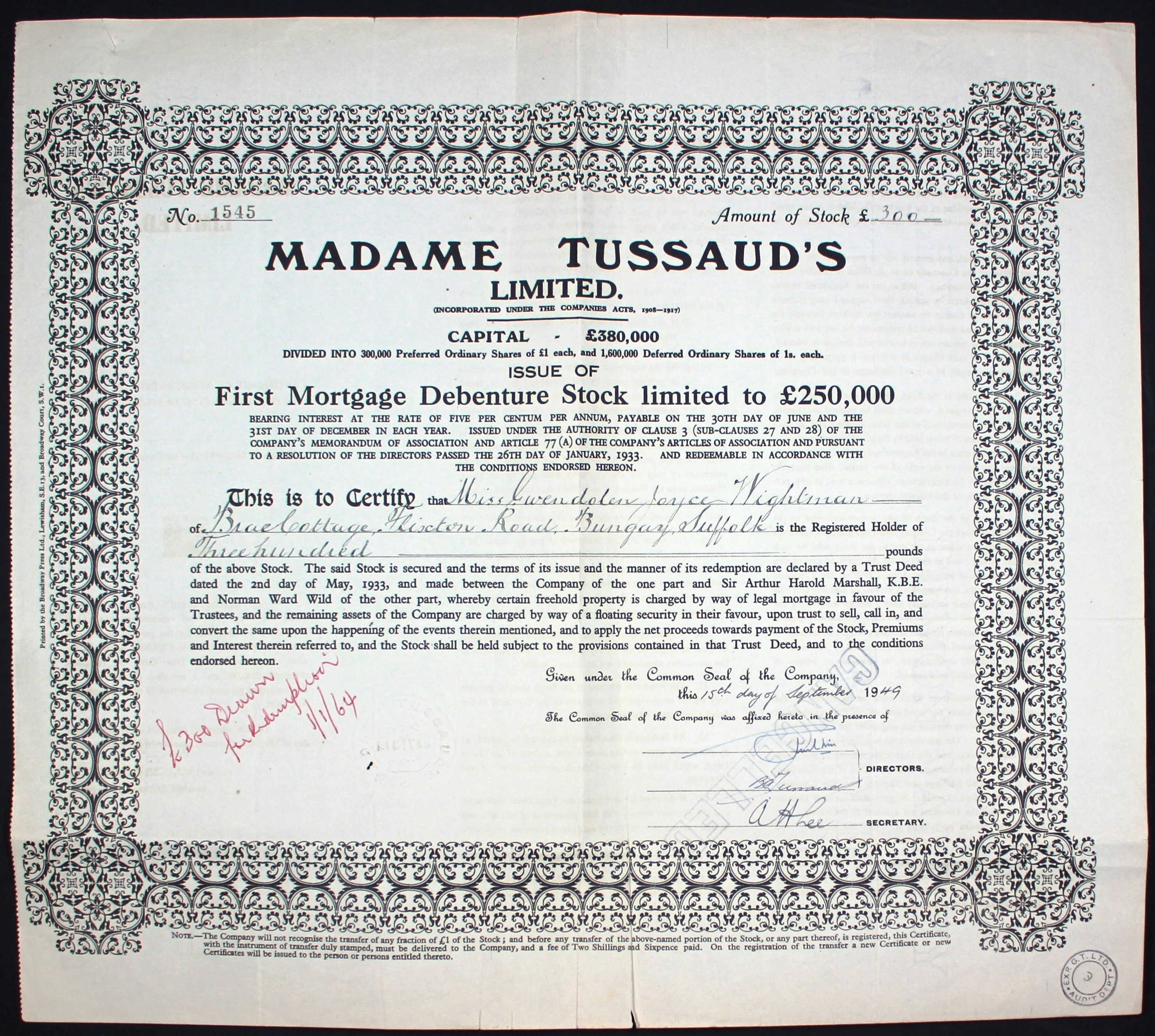
First Mortgage Debenture Stock of Madame Tussaud's Ltd., issued 15. September 1949

In 1926, Madame Tussauds became a limited company. In the 1960s, Tussauds was looking to expand beyond the United Kingdom and opened their first international exhibition in Amsterdam. This exhibition featured different wax figures to those on show in London. The Dutch exhibition moved to the more central location of Dam Square in 1991. The company made its first acquisition with Wookey Hole Caves and Mill in Somerset and in 1976 bought Tolgus tin plant in Cornwall, and also Warwick Castle in Warwickshire.

In the early 1980s, Madame Tussauds approached S. Pearson and Son, now Pearson PLC, to acquire Chessington Zoo for potential development. This led to Pearson purchasing the company and transferring Chessington Zoo's ownership to Tussauds. The group redeveloped it as Chessington World of Adventures, opened in 1987, more than doubling the visitor attendance.

In 1989, the Tussauds Group sold Wookey Hole caves. In the same year, they opened the Rock Circus in the London Pavilion which focused on a rock and roll theme.

In 1990, the company bought Alton Towers for £60 million and began to redevelop the park, including the introduction of the £20 million Alton Towers Hotel in 1996. The Madame Tussauds site in London also underwent development during the nineties, with renovations costing £1 million. The group's expansion resulted in the company moving to larger headquarters in 1992.

In 1997, Madame Tussauds reintroduced travelling exhibitions. The tour started in Melbourne, Australia, before moving on to Sydney. After touring Australia, the site travelled to Singapore in 1999 then on to Hong Kong in 2000. However, the company liked Hong Kong's location and established a permanent exhibition in the Peak Tower.

The Tussauds group moved into the European market by acquiring a 40% stake in Port Aventura theme park in Spain, which was being developed for £300 million to open in 1995. Tussauds contributed to its development as they were a primary shareholder and subsequently took on the park's management. The new development quickly bought in 2.7 million visitors annually. The 40% stake was sold in 1998 and its management of the park ended as the company looked to increase its portfolio in the United Kingdom, subsequently purchasing Thorpe Park, in south-east England in 1998.

In 1998, the group looked to open a Tussauds site in Las Vegas, with plans to open the exhibition in the Venetian Hotel and Casino complex. The Las Vegas site eventually opened in 1999 to large success, which led the company to look for another exhibition location in the United States. In 2000, the company opened a site in New York on 42nd Street.

In 1999, after being a subsidiary of Pearson for twenty years, the Tussauds Group were sold to Charterhouse Development Capital. The new owners brought in new management and sought to increase profits whilst continuing the company's growth.

=== The 2000s ===
In 2000, the London Eye launched, in which Tussauds had a 33% stake, along with British Airways and Marks Barfield. The site was managed by Tussauds and soon became one of the United Kingdom's most popular attractions.

Tussauds continued to look for acquisitions in Europe and in 2002 opted to buy Heide Park in Soltau, Germany. The park was among the country's largest, and helped to make Tussauds one of the most popular attraction groups. In the same year, the company shut down the Rock Circus exhibition in the London Pavilion because of falling visitor figures.

Charterhouse Development Capital allowed the company to invest £300 million into its attractions which helped increase profits by £185 million as of 2002. The Tussauds group launched a new £100 million investment plan which led to the development of a new £40 million themed hotel, at Alton Towers. The themed hotel, Splash Landings, opened in 2003. Tussauds and Charterhouse Development Capital then looked to increase its stake in the London Eye, hoping to buy out British Airways.

In 2004, one of the shareholders of the London Eye, Marks Barfield, accused the Tussauds group of purposefully opposing a refinancing offer in order to gain full control of the wheel. The attraction made a trading profit, but the company had 25% interest payments on a debt that arose from a £56 million loan from British Airways in 1999. By this point the debt had accumulated to be around £130 million. David Marks, the director at Marks Barfield, said that British Airways supported the idea of refinancing the London Eye but the Tussauds group blocked the deal at every opportunity. Marks went on to comment that without a refinancing deal the London Eye would not have long-term financial security in the future as it would not be able to develop as an attraction. The company also went on to say that the running costs of the London Eye and the large debt repayments prevented the company from making developments at the attraction that would cost £4 million. The company had hoped to redevelop a gift shop and the ticketing system at the London Eye but without refinancing it would not be able to complete them. The Tussauds group denied blocking any deals, in turn suggesting that no alternative methods had been put forward. In a statement, the company said that it had offered to buy out the other two shareholders in 2003, and again in 2004, believing that one primary shareholder would be able to negotiate better terms on their debt repayments.

In November 2005, the company bought British Airways’ stake in the London Eye for £95 million. The other shareholder, Marks Barfield, also offered to buy British Airways' stake but the latter chose the Tussauds group as they felt that their offer was more beneficial for the company's shareholders. In February 2006, the group began negotiations to buy the final 33% of the attraction from Marks Barfield for up to £80 million.

In 2005, the Tussauds group was sold to Dubai International Capital, a branch of the government that deals with investment, for £800 million ($1.5 billion).

In May 2007, The Blackstone Group purchased The Tussauds Group for US$1.9 billion and merged it with Merlin Entertainments. Dubai International Capital then held 20% of Merlin Entertainment. The Tussauds Group as a separate entity ceased to exist. About the merger, the chief executive of Merlin Entertainment, Nick Varney, said that the combination of the two groups, as well as their audiences, would place the new company in the global market. He also believed that both groups expertise in the management business would benefit the company too. Peter Phillipson, the chief executive of the Tussauds group added that the new group would be able to help the developments of Tussauds theme parks and attractions as well as increase the number of Madame Tussauds around the world.

On 17 July 2007, Madame Tussauds was sold to private investor Nick Leslau and his investment firm Prestbury under a sale and leaseback agreement. It is said that the company would be using the money from the sale for investment purposes and to pay off some outstanding debts. Although the attraction sites are owned by Prestbury, they continue to be operated by Merlin based on a renewable 35-year lease.
