= Salou =

- Municipality
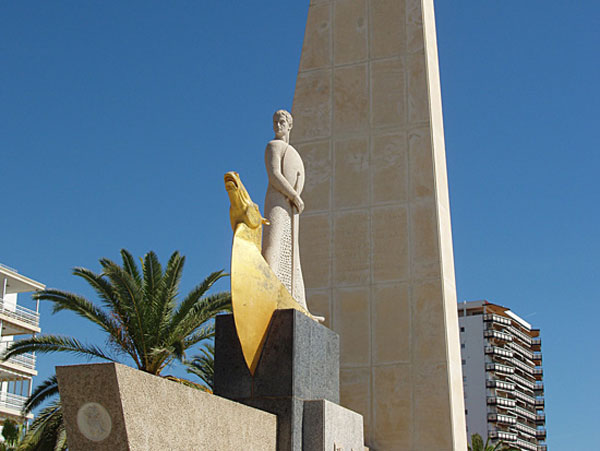
- Monument to Jaume I

- Flag Coat of arms

- Location of Salou in Spain Salou (Spain)
- Coordinates: 41.077°N 1.144°E
- Country: Spain
- Community: Catalonia
- Province: Tarragona
- Comarca: Tarragonès
- Municipality: 30 October 1989

Government
  - Type: Mayor–council
  - Body: Ajuntament de Salou
  - Mayor: Pere Granados Carrillo (2015) (Formació Unitat Per Salou (FUPS))

Area
  - Total: 15.1 km^{2} (5.8 sq mi)
- Elevation (AMSL): 5 m (16 ft)

Population (2025-01-01)
  - Total: 31,491
  - Density: 2,090/km^{2} (5,400/sq mi)
- Demonym(s): Salouean salouenc, salouenca salouense
- Postal code: 43840
- Area code: +34 (Spain) 977 (Province)
- Website: salou.cat

Salou (Catalan pronunciation: [səˈlɔw]) is a resort town and municipality of the comarca of Tarragonès, in the province of Tarragona, in Catalonia, Spain. It has a population of 31,491 (register office, 2025). The city is approximately 10 km from Tarragona and Reus on the Costa Daurada and 112 km from Barcelona.

Founded by the Greeks in the 6th century B.C., the coastal town was a notable commercial port during medieval and modern ages. Throughout the 20th century, Salou became an important European tourist attraction.

Aside from its string of beaches interrupted by rocky coves, and its landscaped promenade, one of its main attractions is the PortAventura World resort. The Dutch movie Costa! and the television series with the same title were both filmed in Salou.

== History ==
Used as a port by Greeks (who named it Salanrio) and Romans (who named it after Salauris), it appeared again in an important historic event, when in 1229 the fleet of James I of Aragon departed from the port of Salou to conquer the Balearic Islands, thus creating the Kingdom of Majorca.

In 1286 Alfons III of Aragon also departed from this port to conquer Menorca, the last Moorish territory of the Balearic Islands.

Later, Salou became a nest of pirates. After that it was considered an unsafe place, so in 1530 Archbishop of Tarragona decided to erect a new defence tower, now called Torre Vella.

In 1865 the railway station began to operate, opening a new development time, that led one hundred years later to a tourist boom that has brought prosperity to the town. Salou was separated from the adjacent municipality of Vila-seca on 30 October 1989 by a decision of the Supreme Court of Spain.

In the summer of 2001, Salou suffered a terrorist attack by ETA, through a car bomb near a hotel. 13 people were injured, including two civil guards.

== Main sights ==
=== Historic buildings and monuments ===
- Church of Santa Maria del Mar, built in 18th-century and enlarged after 1950.
- Torre Vella, a tower built in the 16th century
- Harbour-master's Office
- Jaume I monument
- Font lluminosa fountain
- Monument to Fishermen
- Old Carrilet Railway Station

=== PortAventura World ===
PortAventura World is a growing theme park resort on the Costa Daurada. The resort includes luxury four-star accommodation, two theme parks (PortAventura Park and Ferrari Land), PortAventura Caribe Aquatic Park, a convention centre and a RV park. The PortAventura Park's main attractions are the Dragon Khan, a massive B&M mega-looper; Furius Baco, which is one of the fastest roller coasters in Europe; and Hurakan Condor, a tall falling-tower ride which is 100 metres tall. In 2012 a new roller coaster called Shambhala opened adjacent to the Dragon Khan. The park also has a grand multi-media show, called the FiestaAventura, every night between the end of June and the end of August which features fireworks, fountains and parade floats. Ferrari Land, with the highest and fastest vertical accelerator in Europe, opened in 2017, and will also include the world's first Ferrari hotel.

=== Lumine Mediterranea Beach & Golf Community ===
Salou is also home to the Lumine Golf Club (formerly known as PortAventura golf). There are three courses, labeled as north, south, and central. North and central were designed by Greg Norman and the south course was designed by "Green Project". The facilities consist of two clubhouses, a beach club, Lumine restaurant, Hoyo 19 restaurant, a pro shop, rental services and a golf school. In the future the area surrounding the golf course will be developed into a community with six residential areas and services that include two five-star hotels, a sports area and the International School of Salou that will cater for up to 1200 students as part of the Lumine community.

=== Auditorium Theatre of Salou ===
The Auditorium Theatre of Salou (Teatre Auditori de Salou or TAS to shorten) is an important part of the local community in terms of cultural and leisure in the municipality. The theatre plays local events such as political, school and cultural events and has also welcomed famous musicians to the area such as Sergio Dalma.

=== Beaches ===
Salou's main promenade is the Passeig Jaume I, which runs along the coast adjacent to the Llevant Beach, the longest beach in the town. Other beaches include Platja de Ponent, Platja dels Capellans, Platja Llarga and Platja Cala Crancs. Salou has 34 Blue Flag beaches. Water-sports, rentals and trips can be arranged on the Llevant Beach.

== Sport tourism ==
Salou has been used since 2005 as the base for Rally Catalunya, part of the World Rally Championship. Salou has also held volleyball championships, football tournaments, a triathlon and many other competitive sports.

Saloufest is the University sports festival which takes place on two separate occasions in April on an annual basis. The festival includes DJs and parties at the neighbouring resort's nightclub called Pacha.

In the future, the local government is expected to position Salou as a sport tourism destination and therefore will promote different projects that include first class facilities to provide the city with the necessary resources to become a tourist destination that attracts visitors of reference, especially in low season. They have announced a project that will feature swimming pools, football fields and tennis courts. In April 2012 the Mayor of Salou inaugurated the facilities that have been built, which are six football fields (four artificial and 2 natural) including changing rooms, bar, waiting rooms and rooms for training sessions the second phase includes a further 6 more open fields, billiards room and shop selling merchandise.

Salou is the sub-site for the 2018 Mediterranean Games for sports such as sailing.

== Climate ==
Salou has a Mediterranean climate (Köppen climate classification: Csa) characterized by mild winters and hot summers. The rainiest season is autumn, and the driest season is the summer. Salou receives above 2,500 hours of sunshine annually.

Climate data for Salou
Month	Jan	Feb	Mar	Apr	May	Jun	Jul	Aug	Sep	Oct	Nov	Dec	Year
Mean daily maximum °C (°F)	14.1 (57.4)	15.2 (59.4)	16.7 (62.1)	19.1 (66.4)	23.2 (73.8)	26.3 (79.3)	29.0 (84.2)	29.3 (84.7)	26.2 (79.2)	23.1 (73.6)	18.1 (64.6)	15.2 (59.4)	21.3 (70.3)
Daily mean °C (°F)	9.8 (49.6)	10.5 (50.9)	12.1 (53.8)	15.1 (59.2)	18.7 (65.7)	22.4 (72.3)	24.6 (76.3)	24.8 (76.6)	22.2 (72.0)	19.1 (66.4)	14.1 (57.4)	10.2 (50.4)	17.1 (62.8)
Mean daily minimum °C (°F)	5.9 (42.6)	6.2 (43.2)	8.1 (46.6)	11.1 (52.0)	14.2 (57.6)	18.5 (65.3)	20.1 (68.2)	20.3 (68.5)	18.4 (65.1)	15.0 (59.0)	10.1 (50.2)	5.8 (42.4)	12.9 (55.2)
Average precipitation mm (inches)	38 (1.5)	23 (0.9)	35 (1.4)	40 (1.6)	60 (2.4)	38 (1.5)	15 (0.6)	51 (2.0)	77 (3.0)	65 (2.6)	49 (1.9)	40 (1.6)	504 (19.8)
Average precipitation days (≥ 1 mm)	4	3	4	6	6	4	2	4	5	5	4	4	51
Mean monthly sunshine hours	160	164	199	223	243	264	308	264	201	184	160	138	2,509
Source: Agencia Estatal de Meteorología

== Local Festivals ==
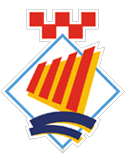
Logo of Salou

- Cavalcade of the Three Kings (January)
- Cós Blanc (Winter festival; first weekend of February)
- International draughts tournament "Salou Open" (May)
- Children's Festival (June)
- St. John's Eve (Late June)
- Nits Daurades (Summer festival, week of 15 August)
- King Jaume I Festival (7 September)
- National Day of Catalonia (11 September)
- Festa de la Segregació (30 October)

== Transport ==
=== Airport ===
Salou's closest airport is Reus (which it is connected to by a regular bus service) followed by Barcelona. Reus Airport is mainly served by the low cost airline Ryanair. The major charter airlines from Britain use Reus throughout the summer as a gateway to the Costa Daurada. The airport mainly serves British and Irish destinations, but domestic and other European destinations are also served.

=== Railway ===
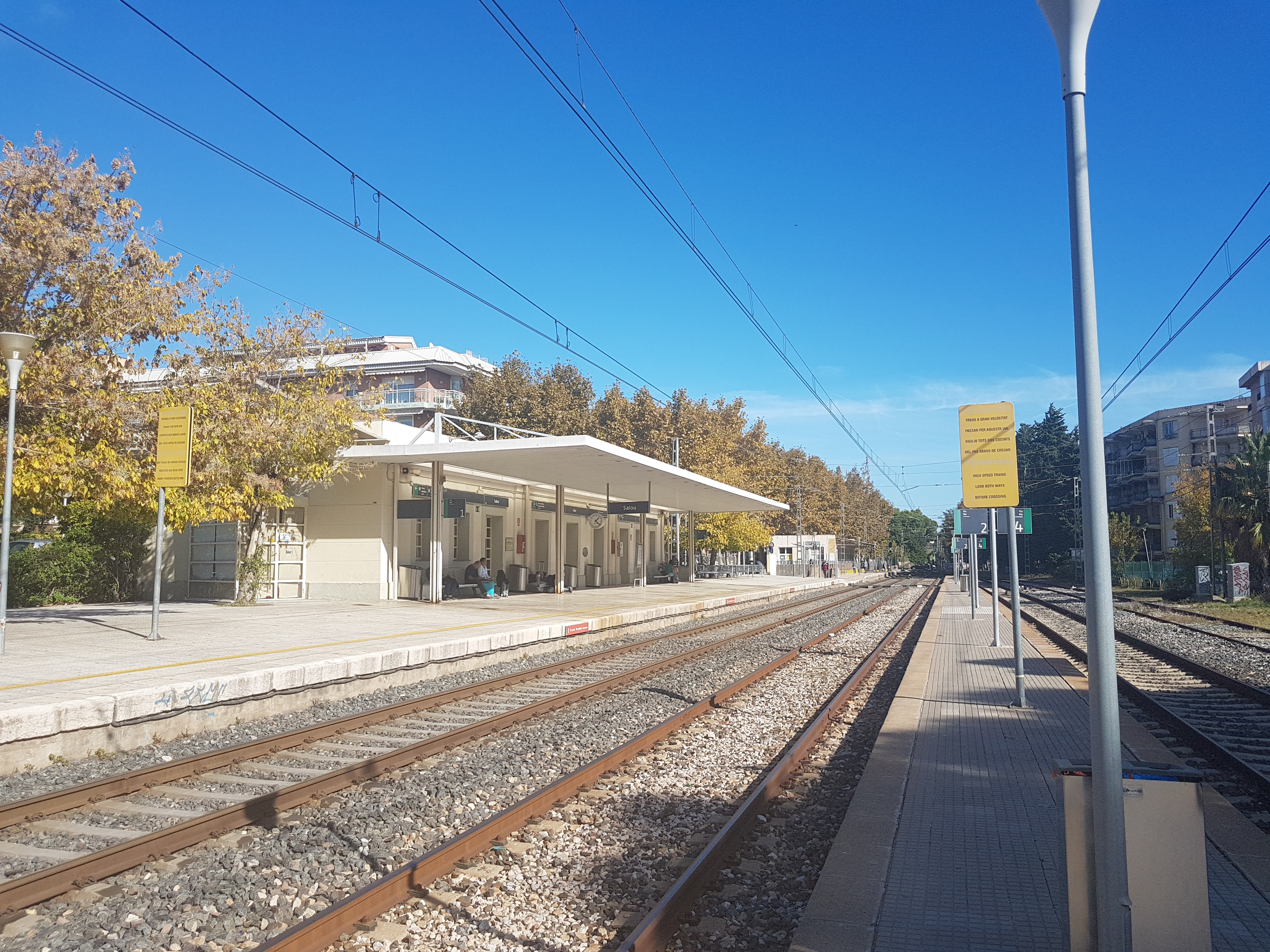
Former Salou station, demolished in 2024

The former Salou Station, located in downtown Salou near Plaça del Carrilet, once served destinations such as Tarragona and Barcelona in Catalonia, as well as Valencia to the south of Salou. The station and the section of the rail line it served were closed in January 2020 after a new line between Tarragona and Amposta was built. The station building was opened in 1865, closed in 2019 and demolished in 2024.

Some regional trains now terminate at the station Salou - Port Aventura to the north east of the city centre, which opened in 1996 soon after the inauguration of PortAventura. The station is served by line R17 (connecting to Tarragona and Barcelona) and RT2. By 2025, a new station building was built after 3 years of construction. The new station building has 1,000 square metres of area containing washrooms, a waiting area, a café and rooms for railway operators. There is also a technical building with 225 square metres of area. There are 210 parking spaces, including 10 for people with reduced mobility and some spots with electric charging. The platforms were extended to 240 metres in length to handle trains up to 200 metres long. The platforms allow access to both sides of a train. TramCamp, a future regional tram line, is planned to have a stop at the station.

=== Taxi ===
There are plenty of taxi services throughout the area including taxi ranks in locations such as opposite the Font lluminosa, Cap Salou and Reus Airport.

=== Bus ===
The bus company that serves the area is called Plana Bus, the destinations include Cambrils, La Pineda, PortAventura, Reus and Tarragona.

== Gallery ==
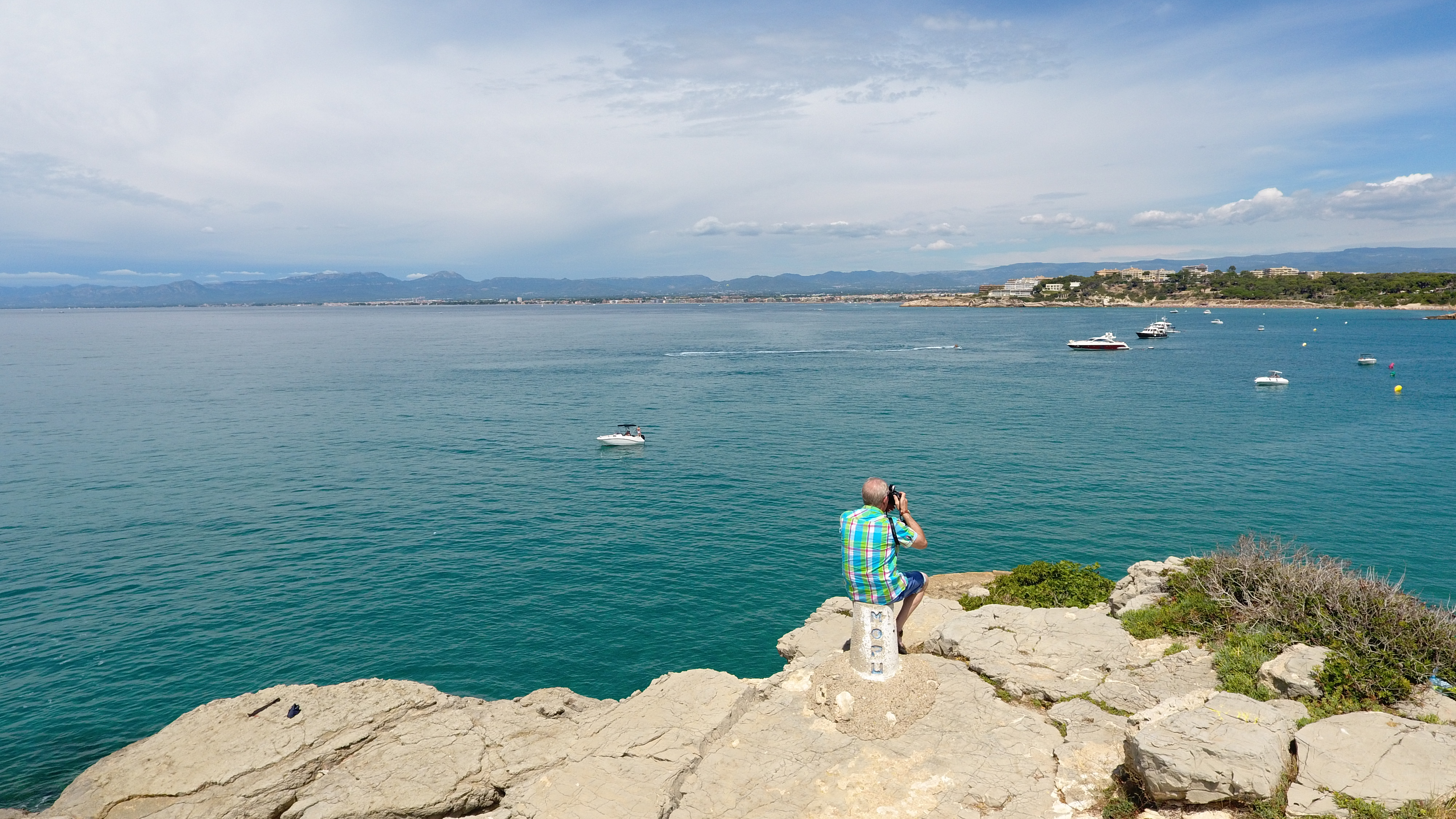
Paseos por la costa y acantilados de Salou

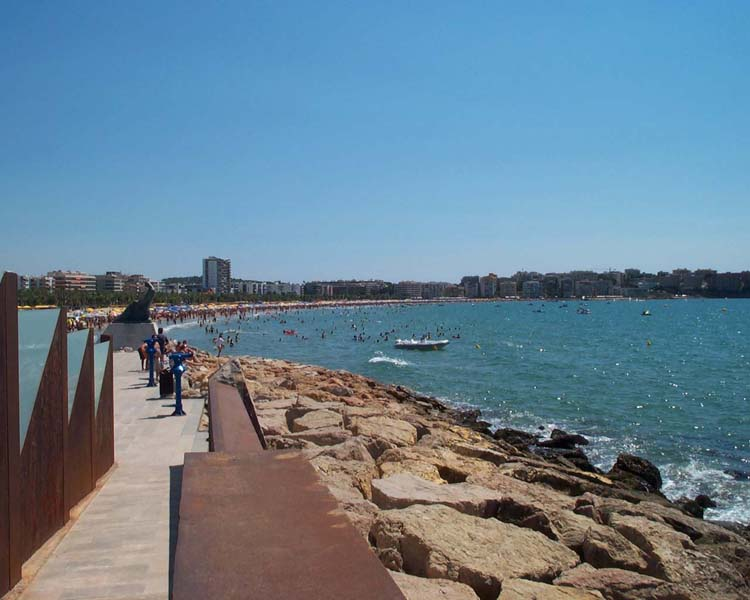
Llevant Beach

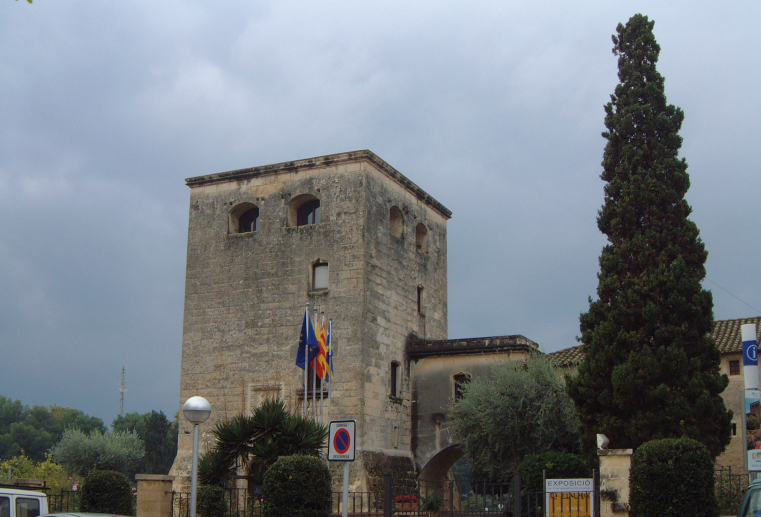
The Torre Vella defence tower

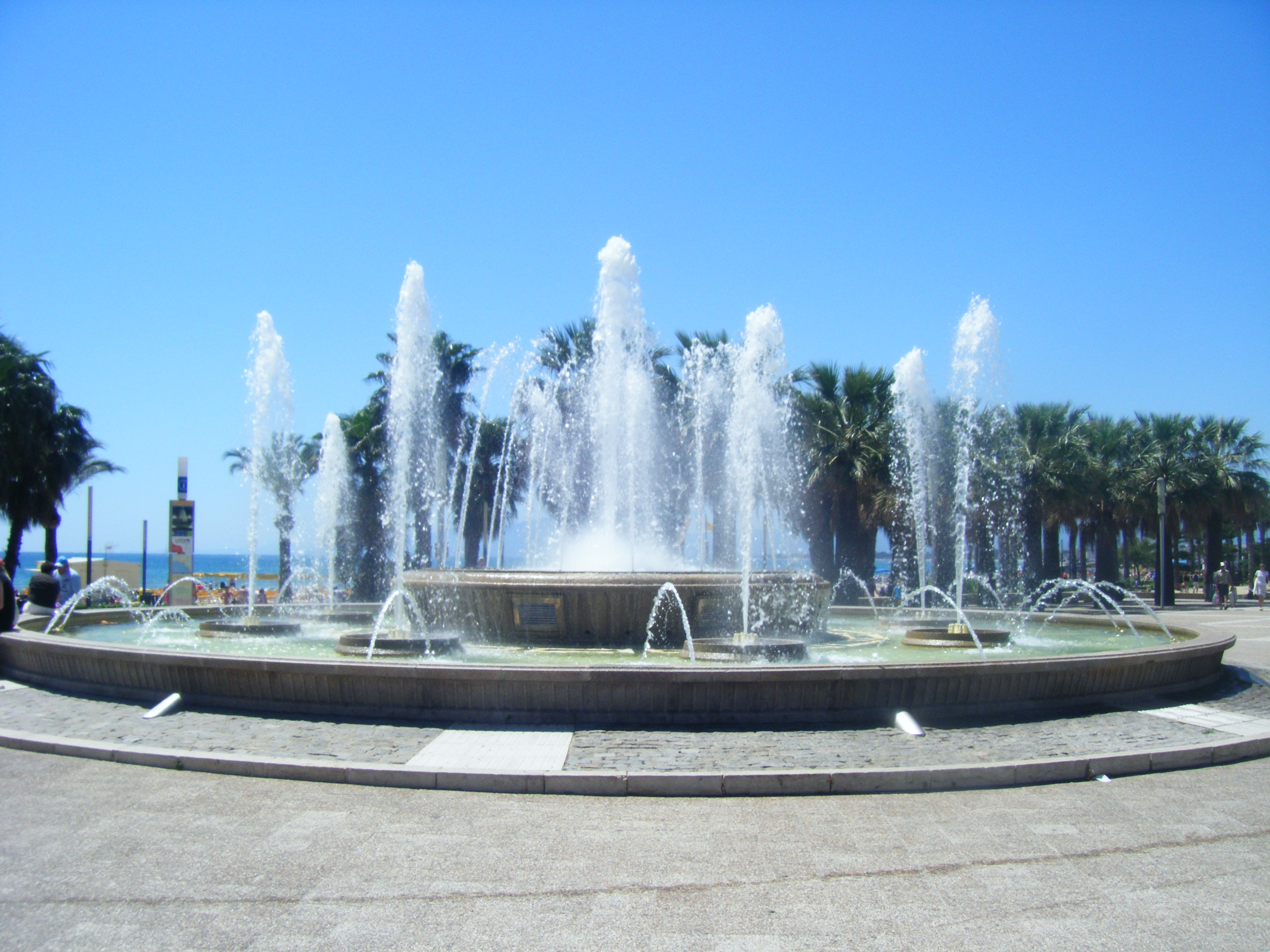
Font lluminosa

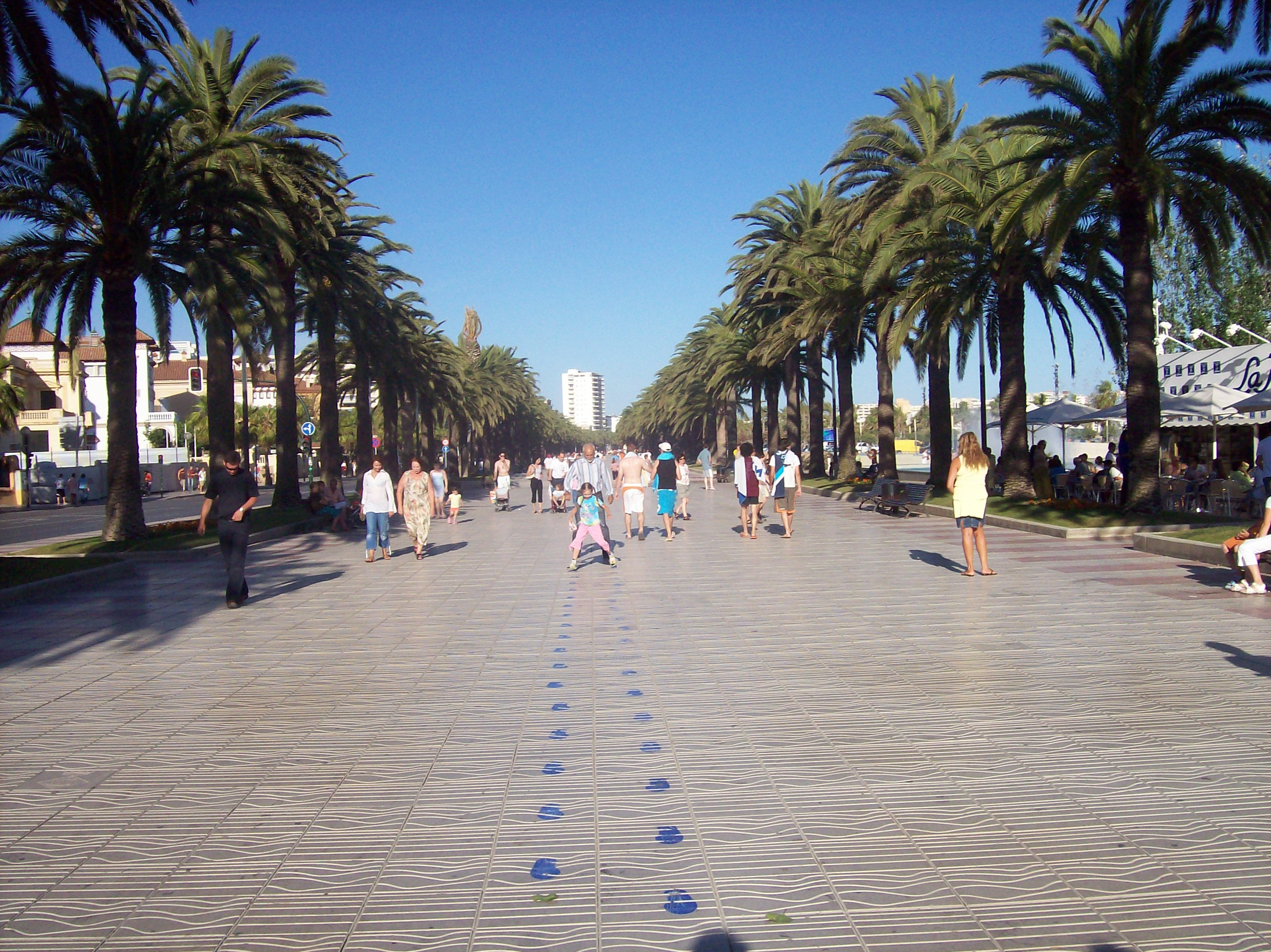
Passeig Jaume I

== Sources ==
- The Book of Deeds of James I of Aragon (available in PDF format)
- Ramon Muntaner, Chronicle, tr. Lady Goodenough (available in PDF format).
