= Detonator (Thorpe Park) =

Drop tower flat ride

Coordinates: 51.403865°N 0.515238°W

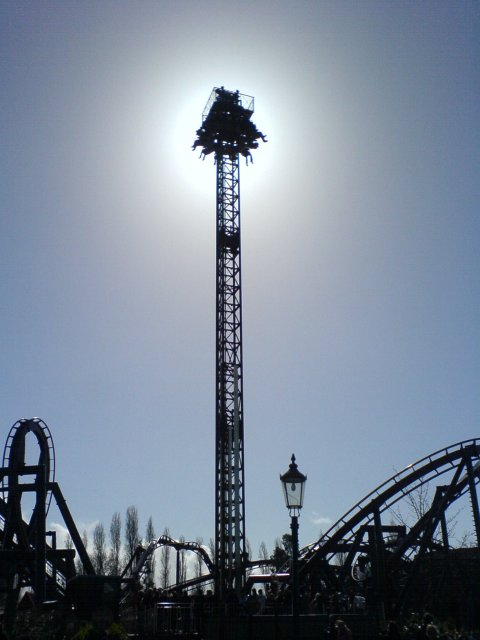
- The 115ft drop

Thorpe Park
- Area: Big Easy Boulevard
- Status: Operating
- Opening date: 6 April 2001
- Replaced: Phantom Fantasia

Ride statistics
- Attraction type: Mega Drop
- Manufacturer: Fabbri Group
- Theme: Fireworks
- Height: 115 ft (35 m)
- Speed: 50 mph (80 km/h)
- G-force: 5.5
- Vehicles: 1
- Riders per vehicle: 12
- Rows: 1 Circular
- Duration: approximately 0:40
- Height restriction: 51 in (130 cm)
- Fastrack available
- Wheelchair accessible
- Must transfer from wheelchair

Detonator (known as Detonator: Bombs Away from 2014 to 2021) is a tower drop ride located at Thorpe Park in Chertsey, Surrey, England. Manufactured by Fabbri, it is classified as a "Mega Drop Tower." The attraction opened in 2001 alongside two other flat rides, Vortex and Zodiac.

The ride stands approximately 115 ft (35 m) tall and is manually released rather than being controlled by a computer. The operator, positioned at the base of the tower, can trigger the drop at any time once the car reaches the top. Upon release, the car is propelled downward by pneumatic mechanisms rather than relying solely on gravity, reaching a speed of 46 mph at the bottom of the drop and creating a sensation of weightlessness for riders.

On-ride photography was introduced for the 2011 season but was removed in 2013.

== History ==
In July 2000, a fire at Thorpe Park destroyed Wicked Witches Haunt and damaged part of Mr Rabbit's Tropical Travels. While the latter was later repaired and reopened, Wicked Witches Haunt was destroyed beyond repair, leaving a large vacant area in the park. To utilize this space, the park applied for temporary planning permission to install a Fabbri Mega-Drop ride.

Detonator opened in 2001 as Thorpe Park's tallest attraction at 115 ft, replacing Wicked Witches Haunt. Following its initial success, the park secured extended planning permission, establishing the ride as a permanent installation. In 2007, a new theme tune was introduced after the park determined that continuing to pay royalties for the original soundtrack was no longer feasible.

In 2014, coinciding with the opening of Angry Birds Land, the ride was rethemed as Detonator: Bombs Away. The original 2001 theme tune remained in use until 2016, when it was replaced with a more upbeat composition incorporating sound effects from the Angry Birds video games.

In 2022, both the online website as well as entrance signage to the ride had been updated, with the name once again as "Detonator".

In 2024, the ride was rethemed to fit in with Big Easy Boulevard.
