= The Walking Dead: The Ride =

Steel indoor roller coaster

- Previously known as X:/ No Way Out (1996-2013); X (2013-2017)
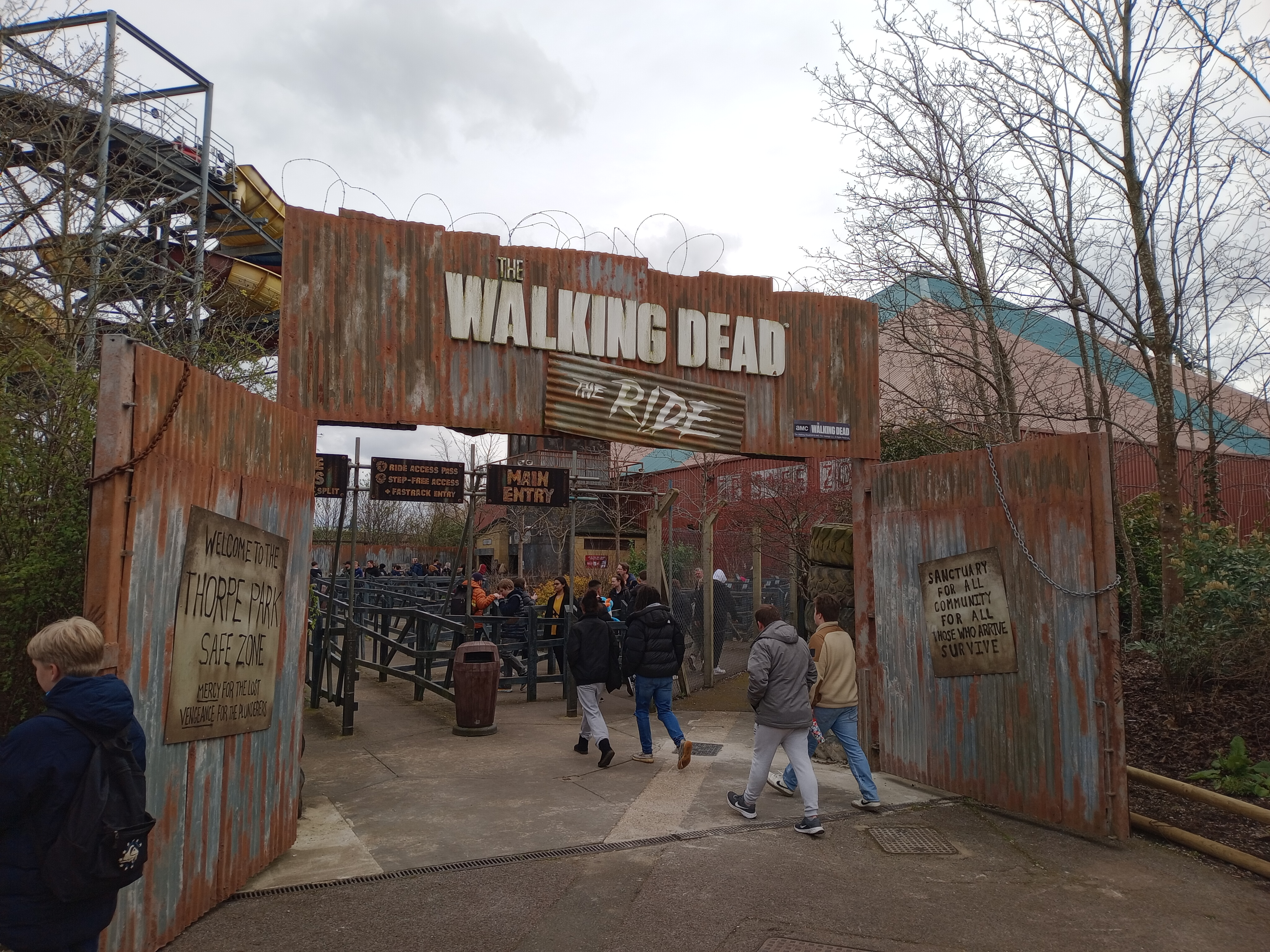
- The entrance to The Walking Dead: The Ride

Thorpe Park Resort
- Location: Thorpe Park Resort
- Park section: The Dock Yard
- Coordinates: 51.4036°N 0.5132°W
- Status: Operating
- Opening date: 1 July 1996 (X:/ No Way Out); 31 March 2018 (The Walking Dead: The Ride)

General statistics
- Manufacturer: Vekoma
- Designer: Vekoma
- Model: Enigma
- Track layout: Modified Enigma
- Lift/launch system: Drive tire lift hill
- Height: 41.7 ft (12.7 m)
- Drop: 33 ft (10 m)
- Length: 1,312.3 ft (400.0 m)
- Speed: 30 mph (48 km/h)
- Inversions: 0
- Duration: 2:10
- Capacity: 700 riders per hour
- G-force: 3.0
- Height restriction: 140 cm (4 ft 7 in)
- Trains: 4 trains each containing 5 cars. Riders are seated 2 across in 1 row per car, for a total of 10 riders per train.
- Fastrack available
- Single rider line available
- Wheelchair accessible
- Must transfer from wheelchair
- The Walking Dead: The Ride at RCDB

The Walking Dead: The Ride (formerly known as X:\ No Way Out and X) is an enclosed steel roller coaster at Thorpe Park in England. It was the park’s first non-powered roller coaster. The attraction originally opened as X:\ No Way Out in 1996, was rethemed and renamed X for the 2013 season, and underwent a further retheming to The Walking Dead: The Ride for the 2018 season. The current version of the ride is themed to the AMC television series The Walking Dead and uses the slogan “Those who ride, survive.”

The attraction features an indoor roller coaster housed within a large blue and terracotta pyramid structure.

== History ==
The attraction opened as X:\ No Way Out on 1 July 1996, becoming Thorpe Park's first non-powered roller coaster. It was promoted as the "world's first backwards roller coaster in the dark" and featured an elaborate queue system with multiple interactive themed rooms, including a trommel tunnel, a "decontamination" area, and illusionary environments. The ride was originally themed around a fictional computer virus that infected the park's power supply, causing the trains to run backward.

After the 2001 season, the ride's cyberpunk theme was significantly reduced, with most interior rooms falling into disuse and many in-ride effects removed. For March 2013, the attraction underwent a re-theme, eliminating the remaining computer-horror elements and shortening its name to X. The roller coaster retained its fully indoor circuit while incorporating a variety of lights, lasers, and music. The trains were refurbished by Vekoma to operate forwards, addressing frequent motion sickness complaints. In the exit queue line, there was a 5 ft-long model of an Eveready AA battery labelled 'Thorpe Park Power Supply'; this was removed in 2013.

In December 2017, plans were filed to significantly alter the attraction's theme once more. The documents included the name "X:\ NWO WD", which prompted speculation about a possible The Walking Dead retheme. On 20 February 2018, Thorpe Park officially announced that the ride would be rethemed as The Walking Dead: The Ride, and on 27 March 2018, the park confirmed the ride's reopening date as 31 March 2018.

The ride layout has also had many features removed since its opening. There is an on-ride photo camera which allowed riders to purchase their on-ride photo; this was removed in 2005 and replaced in 2019. The lift hill of the ride had multi-coloured flashing LED light strips added in 2000; these were removed in 2013.

Along with Derren Brown's Ghost Train: Rise of the Demon, the attraction was closed during the 2020 season due to the COVID-19 pandemic, as social distancing was not possible within the indoor environment. It reopened for the 2021 season on 17 May.

=== Music ===
In 2013, the ride received an original soundtrack to accompany the newly installed lights and lasers. This soundtrack was removed in 2014 and replaced with a playlist of dance music, which was updated in 2016. In June 2017, the dance music was removed, and the ride was given a new original soundtrack composed by IMAscore, featuring an upbeat electronic interpretation of the park's updated Island Theme. The queue line retained the previous soundtrack during this period.

As part of the 2018 refurbishment into The Walking Dead: The Ride, a new soundtrack composed by IMAscore was introduced, incorporating a version of the main theme music from the AMC television series The Walking Dead.

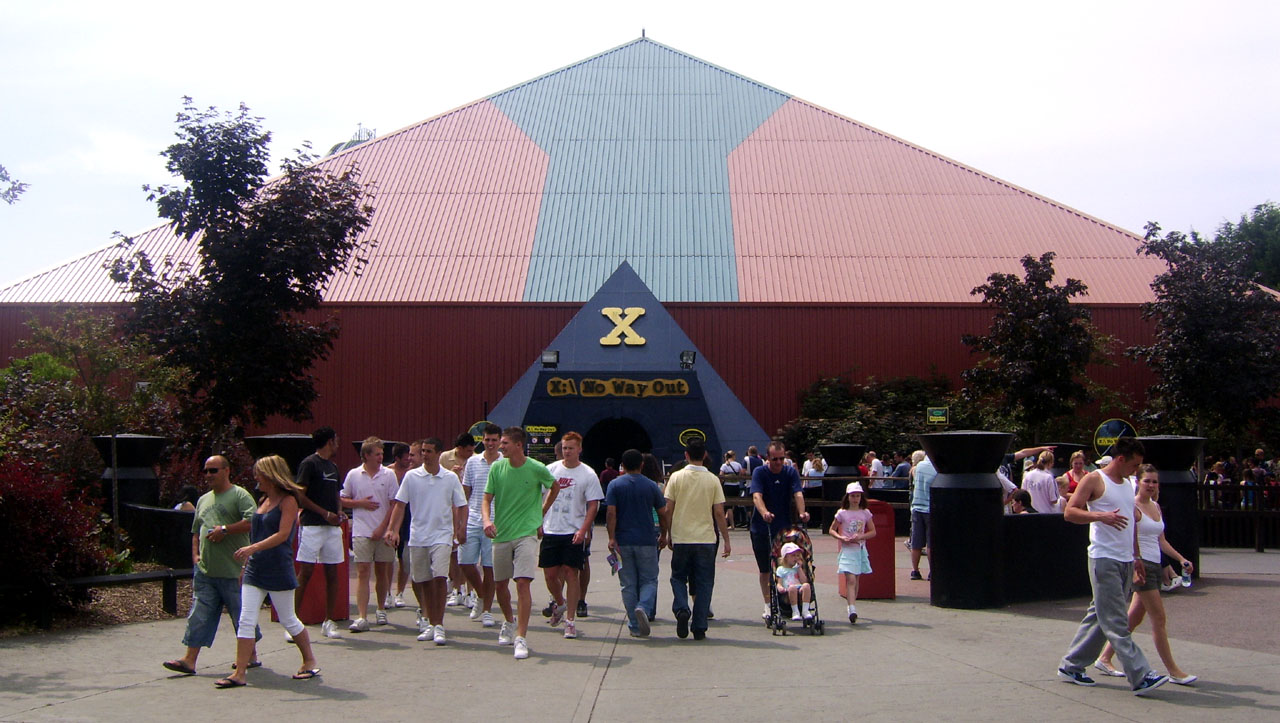
Former X:\ No Way Out entrance

== Ride experience ==
=== As X:\ No Way Out and X ===
Riders entered the queue line inside the pyramid structure and proceeded along a long, narrow corridor illuminated by neon lights and ceiling-mounted lasers, with dance music playing throughout. After navigating a series of switchback sections, guests reached the loading platform.

The train exited the station into a right-hand turn leading onto the drive tyre lift hill. Upon reaching the top, the trains descended at speeds of up to 28 mph (45 km/h) through a series of helixes and sharp turns. Throughout the circuit, bright, multicoloured disco lights and laser effects accompanied an upbeat electronic remix of the park’s Island Theme, composed by IMAscore. At the end of the circuit, the train arrived at the exit platform, where riders disembarked and proceeded along a narrow exit corridor before returning outdoors.

=== As The Walking Dead: The Ride ===
Riders enter through a themed queue, which includes a watchtower constructed specifically for the ride’s retheming and inspired by the watchtower featured on the prison set of the AMC television series The Walking Dead. Guests are led into a small pre-show room where a man appears on a screen to ask three questions, with responses delivered via a speaker. Additional sound effects and visuals on a rear screen create the impression of an attempted intrusion, which interrupts the questioning and signals a simulated zombie breach. The man on the screen then directs riders to the loading zone. An automated door opens, guiding guests through narrow corridors illuminated by red flashing lights, with walls decorated to resemble smeared blood.

Riders enter the loading platform, accompanied by loud music and periodic air horn sounds. Guests are grouped into pairs and board the train, which ascends a tire-drive lift hill. Following a drop and a series of twists and turns, the train comes to a temporary stop while a video of the man from the earlier pre-show sequence indicates that he is unable to restart the vehicle. The ride uses the block section of the track to simulate repeated failed attempts to move, with accompanying sound effects to enhance the suspense. The train eventually resumes motion and continues through additional twists and turns before arriving at the off-load platform at the end of the circuit.

At the end of the ride, riders disembark and pass through doors marked “DON’T OPEN, DEAD INSIDE,” replicating the iconic design from the hospital set of the AMC television series The Walking Dead. During peak periods, actors portraying either survivors or zombies may interact with guests, briefly pursuing them along the exit corridor to enhance the immersive experience.

== Features ==
=== Brake Runs ===
The ride features three mid-course brake runs. During its operation as X:\ No Way Out, the brakes briefly stopped the train while misters sprayed above riders’ heads (removed by 2013) and sound effects played through speakers to disorient them. On the third brake run, the train moved backward a few metres—though from the riders’ perspective, it appeared to move forward, as the trains originally ran in reverse—before being propelled forwards. Following a 2007 refurbishment, two robot mannequins from the old queue line were positioned on the third brake run and illuminated to surprise riders; these were removed a few weeks into the 2013 season. In later years under the X branding, the brake runs simply allowed trains to pass through without stopping. As The Walking Dead: The Ride, the brake runs once again stop the train at specific points, but they have been modified to create sudden forward jolts for dramatic effect.

=== Safety ===
Following its retheming to The Walking Dead: The Ride, the minimum height requirement was increased from 1.2 m to 1.4 m tall to align with the park’s recommended age guideline of 13 years and older; the ride’s trains and restraints were not modified. Both seats in a row must be occupied, as the design of the restraints could allow a lone rider to slide out.

== Accident ==
On 6 June 2000, Surrey Ambulance Service received a report that a passenger had fallen more than 20 feet from the ride. A boy was ejected from the train while it was stopped on one of the block brakes. The incident was not attributed to a ride malfunction; it was believed that the boy had stood up during the ride. He sustained lacerations to both shins and a minor head injury.
