= Flying Fish (roller coaster) =

Steel powered roller coaster

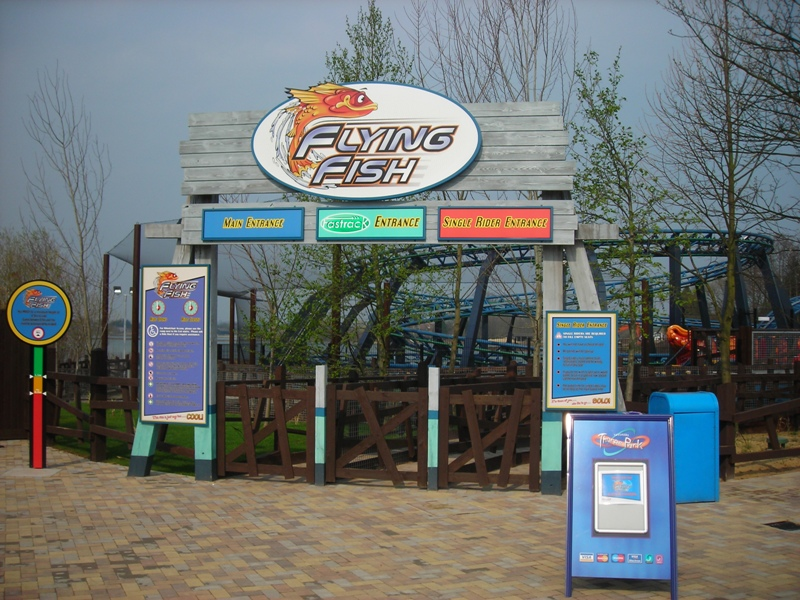
- Flying Fish Entrance

Thorpe Park
- Location: Thorpe Park
- Park section: Amity
- Coordinates: 51.4052°N 0.5139°W
- Status: Operating
- Opening date: 1984 (Opened); 10 March 2007 (Re-opened)
- Cost: £1 million (Rebuild)

General statistics
- Type: Steel
- Manufacturer: Mack Rides
- Designer: Blauer Enzian
- Model: Powered
- Lift/launch system: Powered coaster
- Height: 20 ft (6.1 m)
- Drop: 13 ft (4.0 m)
- Length: 767 ft (234 m)
- Speed: 16.8 mph (27.0 km/h)
- Inversions: 0
- Capacity: 1,100 riders per hour
- G-force: 2.1
- Height restriction: 90 cm (2 ft 11 in)
- Website: Official website
- Trains: 1 train containing 10 cars. Riders are seated 2 across in 2 rows, with only 1 row in the first car, for a total of 38 riders per train.
- Fastrack available
- Wheelchair accessible
- Must transfer from wheelchair
- Flying Fish at RCDB

Flying Fish is a powered steel roller coaster located at Thorpe Park in Surrey, England. The ride originally opened in 1984 under the name Space Station Zero and was relocated outdoors in 1990. It was removed in 2005 to make way for the construction of Stealth, before being reinstalled at a different location within the park in 2007.

== History ==
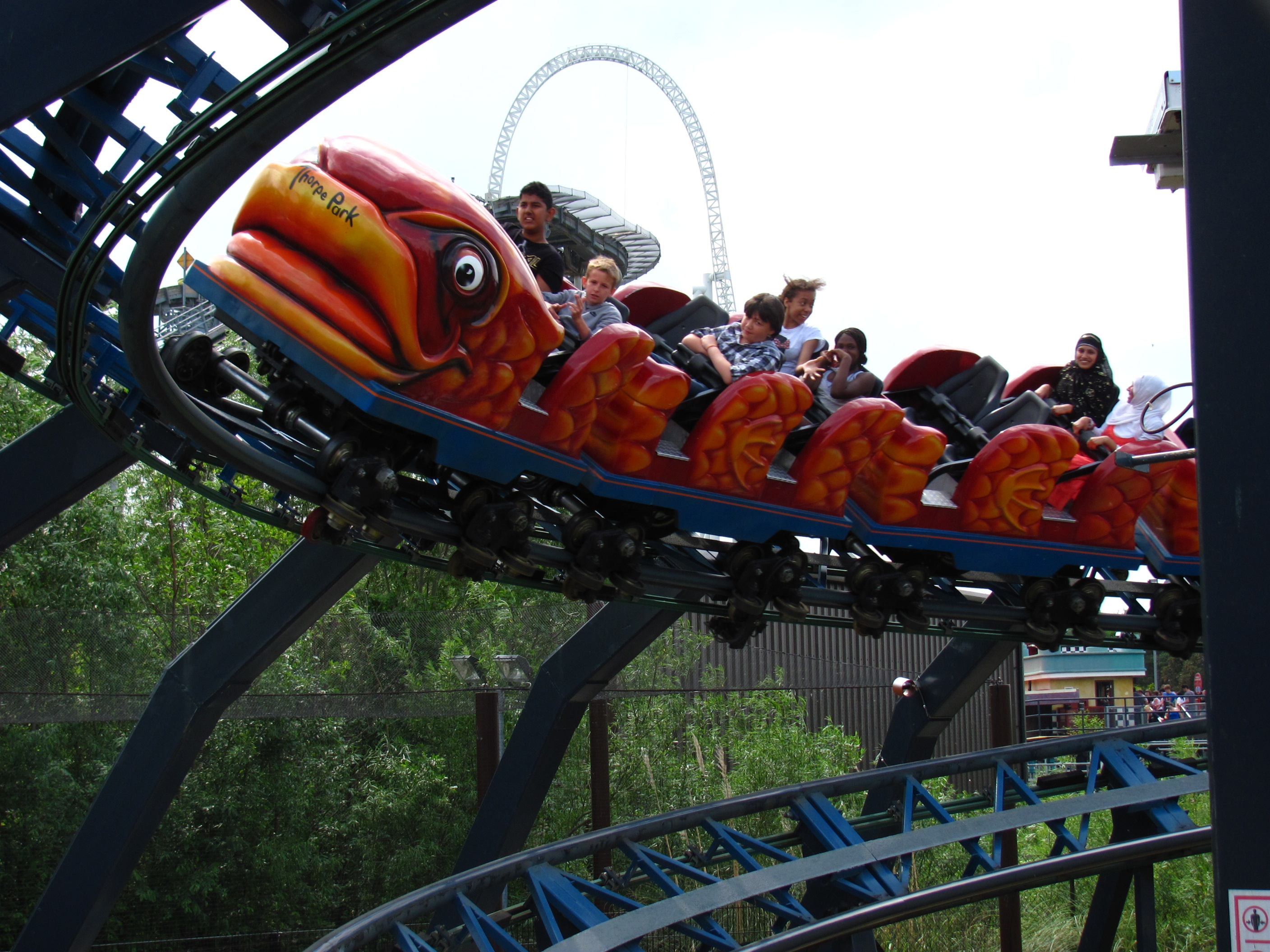
The roller coaster

=== Space Station Zero ===
Space Station Zero opened in 1984 at Thorpe Park in England and was the park's first roller coaster, themed as a flight through outer space. Riders boarded the train and pulled down their over-the-shoulder restraints. Once the restraints were lowered and secured, the train left the station and travelled around a bend through a tunnel of flashing lights. The ride did two laps of the track, the first in the dark and the second lit by glitter balls to appear as stars. The attraction closed in 1989 for the coaster to be moved outside.

=== Flying Fish ===
The ride reopened in 1990, renamed The Flying Fish and relocated outdoors to an area of the Sunken Garden. The trains were refurbished to use lap bars instead of the original restraints, and received a new green and blue fish theme.

In 2005 Flying Fish was removed in to make room for the construction of Stealth. The ride was reopened in 2007 after another refurbishment, now located in the Amity area between Depth Charge and Tidal Wave. The refurbishment saw the restraints updated to individual lap bars and the train repainted orange.
