= Storm surge (disambiguation) =

Storm surge is the rise of water surface associated with a low pressure weather system. It may also refer to:

- Storm Surge (ride), a ride at Thorpe Park
- Storm Tide (film), a 1927 German silent film
