= Thorpe Park =

Theme park in Surrey, England

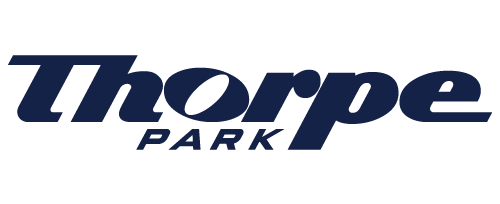
- Interactive map of Thorpe Park
- Location: Chertsey and Staines, Surrey, England
- Coordinates: 51°24′17″N 0°30′47″W
- Status: Operating
- Opened: 24 May 1979; 47 years ago
- Owner: City Place Nominees, as nominees for the TP2 Unit Trust (freehold); LondonMetric Property (999-year leasehold)
- Operated by: Merlin Entertainments
- General manager: Ruth Storey (Vice President)
- Slogan: The Home Of Feel-Good Thrills
- Operating season: Theme Park; March – November; Thorpe Shark Cabins; March – November / December (private events); Thorpe Park Marquee; March – November / December (private events)
- Attendance: 2025: 1,500,000 (▼2%)
- Area: 410 acres (1.7 km^{2}; 170 ha) *Total combined area including Lakes and all back of house areas

Attractions
- Total: 26
- Roller coasters: 8
- Water rides: 3
- Website: www.thorpepark.com

Thorpe Park (formerly known as Thorpe Park Resort) is a theme park located in the village of Thorpe between the towns of Chertsey and Staines-upon-Thames in Surrey, England, 20 miles (32 km) west-southwest of Central London. It is operated by Merlin Entertainments and features rides, themed hotel cabins, live events, and Hyperia, the United Kingdom's tallest and fastest rollercoaster at over 236 feet (72m) and 129 km/h (80 mph). The ride also includes Europe's tallest element and the world's first outer-banked airtime hill. In 2019, Thorpe Park was the United Kingdom's third most visited theme park (1.9 million visitors), behind Alton Towers and Legoland Windsor.

Thorpe Park opened in 1979, originally as a leisure park, on the site of expended, flooded gravel pits that give it its distinctive water-based surroundings. It has since expanded into a major theme park in the United Kingdom. Major attractions include a number of roller coasters, Hyperia, Colossus, Nemesis Inferno, Saw – The Ride, Stealth, The Swarm, and The Walking Dead: The Ride, as well as a dark ride, Ghost Train.

== History ==
=== Initial development ===
The present day site was previously a gravel pit, owned by Ready Mixed Concrete Limited. RMC extracted gravel from the site for thirty years, from 1941 until 1970, at which point the company planned to flood the expended pits and develop the site into a leisure-based visitor attraction. In 1975, the Water Ski World Championships were held on the lake.

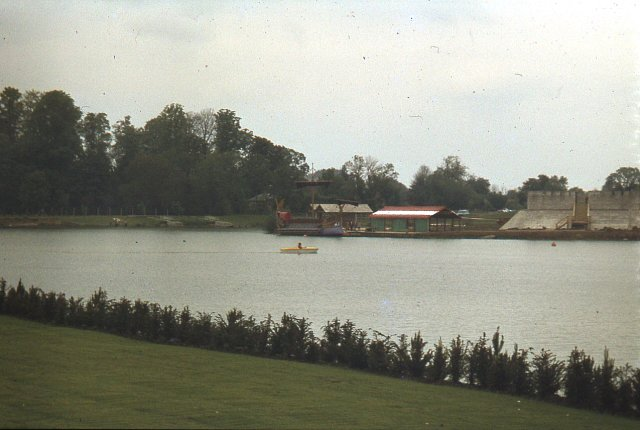
Thorpe Park Lake in July 1979, the year the park opened to the public

RMC established a subsidiary, Leisure Sport Limited, to operate the 400-acre (160 ha) park for water sports, leisure activities, and heritage exhibitions, at a cost of £3 million. The park was formally opened to the public by Lord Louis Mountbatten on 24 May 1979, in what would be his final public appearance before he was assassinated later that year by a bomb planted by the Provisional IRA on a fishing boat in Mullaghmore, Ireland. In addition to its lakes and parkland, the site featured a replica Stone Age cave, a Celtic farm, a Norman castle, and a Viking camp, as well as exhibits of historic watercraft and aircraft.

=== Theme park development ===
In the early 1980s, the park was redeveloped into a theme park with permanent themed rides and attractions. New large attractions were introduced throughout the 1980s, including Magic Mill, Phantom Fantasia, Thunder River, Logger's Leap and the Canada Creek Railway, along with the development of a central area of themed streets, shops and eateries.

Space Station Zero was the park's first roller coaster, an indoor powered coaster, opened in 1984.

New themed areas opened in the 1990s with Fantasy Reef and Ranger County. The last major attraction developed under Leisure Sport Ltd was the themed indoor roller coaster, X:\ No Way Out, in 1996 (now The Walking Dead: The Ride).

Between 1983 and 1989, the park was also used as a filming location for The Benny Hill Show.

In 1998, The Tussauds Group purchased the park. This period saw considerable investment, with major attractions opening such as Tidal Wave in 2000, Vortex in 2001, Colossus in 2002, Nemesis Inferno in 2003, and Stealth in 2006.

In May 2007, the Blackstone Group purchased The Tussauds Group for US$1.9 billion, and the company was merged into Merlin Entertainments, who took over operation of Thorpe Park. Dubai International Capital also acquired a 20% stake in Merlin Entertainments.

On 16 July 2007, as part of the financing for the Tussauds acquisition, Blackstone and Prestbury announced a sale and leaseback of certain Merlin properties including Thorpe Park, for a total of £622 million.

Merlin operates the site under a lease, originally for 35 years and extended by a further 35 years in December 2021. Prestbury's interest passed to Secure Income REIT, which merged with LXi REIT in July 2022; LXi was acquired by LondonMetric Property in March 2024. In October 2022 the freeholds of Thorpe Park and Alton Towers were sold for £257 million as a 65-year income strip, with 999-year leases granted back to the seller. The freehold is registered to City Place Nominees 1 Limited and City Place Nominees 2 Limited, companies incorporated in Guernsey, as nominees for Northern Trust (Guernsey) Limited as trustee of the TP2 Unit Trust; the price recorded on 19 October 2022 was £86,459,683.

The freehold title carries a restriction, entered in August 2007, under which no disposition of the registered estate may be registered without the written consent of Hall Aggregates Limited or a certificate that the provisions of a transfer dated 4 August 1998 have been complied with, together with a unilateral notice of a development gains agreement of the same date in favour of Hall Aggregates. Hall Aggregates Limited is controlled by Cemex Investments Limited.

In 2009, the park opened Saw – The Ride.

In 2010, the park outlined a five-year development plan, which proposed new roller coasters for 2012; this was later realised with the opening of The Swarm. The plan also included a roller coaster scheduled for 2015 and a permanent lakeside hotel, neither of which has come to fruition. No application was ever submitted for the 2015 development, and the site behind The Swarm remains undeveloped.

In 2014, Merlin also sought to broaden the park's appeal to families with additions including Angry Birds Land and the park's onsite hotel.

In July 2016, the park opened Derren Brown's Ghost Train. After the 2022 operating season, the ride’s virtual reality elements were removed, and its association with Derren Brown was discontinued.

On 20 February 2019, Thorpe Park's official Twitter account confirmed the permanent closure of Logger's Leap. In 2021, the park announced plans to construct a new roller coaster on the former site of the log flume. During the 2023 Fright Nights event, the ride was officially revealed as Hyperia. Designed to become the tallest and fastest roller coaster in the United Kingdom, Hyperia reaches a height of 236 feet (71.9 metres) and achieves speeds of up to 81 mph (130 km/h).[16] The roller coaster opened to the public on 23 May 2024.

For the 2023 season, Derren Brown's Ghost Train was re-imagined into Ghost Train.

For the 2024 season, Thorpe Park adopted a new logo and branding, which the park stated was to "encapsulate the spirit of Thorpe Park".

For the 2026 season, it was announced that approximately half of the Amity Beach area would be redeveloped to create a new relaxation zone called The Launchpad. The Launchpad is designed as a year-round space for visitors to rest and refuel between rides, featuring seating and canopies. The smaller remaining half of Amity Beach will remain operational.

On 12 March 2026, the park released an official statement alongside Jack Silkstone, confirming the permanent closure of Rumba Rapids after 39 years of operation. The park has stated ‘Whilst we don’t have plans to share just yet on what’s next, we’re always reviewing our line-up of world-class rides and attractions to make sure Thorpe Park remains the UK’s most thrilling theme park’.

== Rides and attractions ==
=== Roller coasters ===
Name	Picture	Type	Opened	Territory	Manufacturer	Additional information
Hyperia		Hypercoaster	2024	Fearless Valley	Mack Rides	A Mack Rides Hypercoaster themed around Hyperia, the "Golden Goddess," who is depicted as being trapped on an island due to her fear of water. Inspired by the birds flying above, she fashioned wings of unbreakable golden steel to soar above the waters and overcome her fear, hence the slogan "find her fearless." It is currently the tallest, fastest, and most weightless roller coaster in the United Kingdom, reaching a maximum height of 236 ft and speeds exceeding 81 mph. The minimum height requirement is 1.3 m (4 ft 3 in).
The Swarm		Wing Coaster	2012	Swarm Island	Bolliger & Mabillard	The United Kingdom's first winged coaster, opened in 2012. It was the first winged coaster to feature an inverted "wing-over drop". Between 2013 and 2016, the rear two rows were modified to face backwards. The ride is themed around a post-apocalyptic universe in which Thorpe Park is under attack by aliens. The Swarm is the only attraction on Swarm Island. The minimum height requirement is 1.4 m (4 ft 7 in), and the maximum height limit is 1.95 m (6 ft 5 in).
Saw – The Ride		Euro-Fighter	2009	—N/a	Gerstlauer	A custom Euro-Fighter featuring a beyond-vertical drop of 100 degrees and 100 ft (30 m) drop. It is themed to the Saw film franchise and was marketed as the world's first horror-film-themed roller coaster. The minimum height requirement is 1.4 m (4 ft 7 in).
Stealth		Accelerator Coaster	2006	Amity Speedway	Intamin	An Intamin hydraulic launch Accelerator Coaster standing 205 ft (62 m) tall and accelerating from 0 to 80 mph (0 to 129 km/h) in 1.8 seconds. Its the third-tallest roller coaster in the United Kingdom and the second-fastest, having been surpassed by Hyperia. It is often regarded as having the fastest acceleration of any roller coaster in the world. Stealth was previously recognised as the park's flagship attraction prior to the opening of Hyperia. The ride features a loose 1950s-style drag-racing theme. The minimum height requirement is 1.4 m (4 ft 7 in), and the maximum height limit is 1.96 m (6 ft 5 in).
Nemesis Inferno		Inverted roller coaster	2003	The Jungle	Bolliger & Mabillard	A B&M inverted roller coaster that opened in 2003, named after Nemesis (now renamed Nemesis Reborn) at its sister park, Alton Towers. The ride has a loose volcano theme and features the first interlocking corkscrews on an inverted coaster. The minimum height requirement is 1.4 m (4 ft 7 in). It was filmed for The Inbetweeners episode "Thorpe Park".
Colossus		Multi Inversion Coaster	2002	Lost City	Intamin	Opened in 2002, the ride achieved the world record for the most inversions on a roller coaster, featuring ten inversions. This record was surpassed in 2013 by The Smiler at its sister park, Alton Towers, which includes fourteen inversions in 2013. Marketed as "the world's first ten-looping roller coaster", it is loosely themed around traversing the ruins of a lost Atlantean civilisation. The minimum height requirement is 1.4 m (4 ft 7 in), and the maximum height limit is 1.96 m (6 ft 5 in).
The Walking Dead: The Ride		Sit-down roller coaster	1996 (2013) (2018)	The Dock Yard	Vekoma	Situated at the centre of the park within a pyramid-shaped structure, the attraction is based on The Walking Dead franchise. On peak days, the ride's exit features live actors. It was previously known as X, which had a rave and dance-music theme, and originally as X:\ No Way Out, which featured a computer-virus theme. The minimum height requirement is 1.4 m (4 ft 7 in).
Flying Fish		Powered roller coaster	1984 (1990) (2007)	Amity Cove	Mack Rides	A powered roller coaster. It originally opened in 1984 as an indoor attraction named Space Station Zero. The ride was moved outdoors in 1990, to the site now occupied by Stealth. It reopened in its current location next to Amity Beach in 2007. The minimum height requirement is 0.9 m (2 ft 11 in).

=== Flat rides ===
Name	Picture	Type	Opened	Territory	Manufacturer	Additional Information
Rush		Screamin' Swing	2005	Lost City	S&S – Sansei Technologies	A Screamin' Swing ride which opened alongside Slammer in 2005. The minimum height requirement is 1.3 m (4 ft 3 in).
Samurai		Top Scan	2004	—N/a	Mondial	A Top Scan ride, formerly located at Chessington World of Adventures under the same name. The ride was repainted when it was relocated to Thorpe Park, and was repainted again for the 2024 season. It is loosely themed around the sword of a Japanese samurai warrior. The minimum height requirement is 1.4 m (4 ft 7 in).
Quantum		Magic Carpet	2003	Lost City	Fabbri Group	A large Magic Carpet ride. The minimum height requirement is 1.2 m (3 ft 11 in).
Vortex		Afterburner	2001	Lost City	KMG	A KMG Afterburner which opened in June 2001. The minimum height requirement is 1.4 m (4 ft 7 in).
Detonator		Drop tower	2001 (2014) (2022) (2024)	Big Easy Boulevard	Fabbri Group	A 35-metre-tall drop tower, added to the park following the Thorpe Park fire. Originally intended as a temporary addition, it was later made a permanent addition. The ride was renamed "Detonator: Bombs Away!" for the opening of Angry Birds Land in 2014, before reverting to its original name, Detonator, in 2023. It was previously themed to the Angry Bird Detonator, but is now loosely themed around a firework. The ride reaches a maximum speed of 45 mph and exerts a maximum G-force of 5.5 G. The minimum height requirement is 1.3 m (4 ft 3 in). It received a soft retheme in 2024.
Zodiac		Enterprise	2000 (2001) (2006)	Lost City	HUSS	A HUSS Enterprise that originally opened in 2000 as Enterprise, intended as a temporary attraction. It was renamed "Zodiac" and made a permanent attraction in 2001. At the end of the 2005 season, Zodiac was removed and replaced by another HUSS Enterprise relocated from Drayton Manor, where it had operated as Cyclone. The replacement opened at the start of the 2006 season. The minimum height requirement is 1.1 m (3 ft 7 in).

=== Water rides ===
Name	Picture	Type	Opened	Territory	Manufacturer	Additional Information
Storm Surge		Spinning rapids ride	2011	Amity Cove	WhiteWater West	The ride features a 19.5 m (64 ft) lift and spirals riders down a chute. It was originally located at Cypress Gardens until Merlin acquired the park and redeveloped it as Legoland Florida.
Tidal Wave		Shoot the chute	2000	Amity Cove	Hopkins Rides	When the ride opened in 2000 it was the tallest water ride in Europe. The ride has had several sponsors, including Dr Pepper and Oasis. The minimum height requirement is 1.2 m (3 ft 11 in).
Depth Charge		Water slide	1991	Amity Cove	NV Aquatic	Opened as the first four-lane dinghy water slide in the United Kingdom.

=== Family attractions ===
Name	Picture	Type	Opened	Territory	Manufacturer	Additional Information
High Striker		Jumpin' Star	2017 (2022)	Amity Cove	Zamperla	A Jumpin' Star ride, originally relocated from Weymouth Sea Life, it opened in Old Town as Lumber Jump in 2017. The ride was rethemed and moved to Amity in 2022 as High Striker. The minimum height requirement is 0.9 m (2 ft 11 in).
Big Easy Bumpers		Dodgems	2014 (2024)	Big Easy Boulevard	Bertazzon	A dodgems ride added in 2014 for Angry Birds Land. Rebranded as Big Easy Bumpers for the 2024 season, having previously been known as King Pig's Wild Hog Dodgems. The minimum height requirement is 1.1 m (3 ft 7 in), or 1.3 m (4 ft 3 in) if accompanied by a guardian.
Mr Monkey's Banana Ride		Pirate ship	1994	The Jungle	Metallbau Emmeln	A small, banana-themed swinging ship ride, themed after one of the Thorpe Park Rangers. The minimum height requirement is 0.9 m (2 ft 11 in).
Dobble Tea Party		Teacups	1986 (2023)	Big Easy Boulevard	Mack Rides	A teacups ride. Originally sponsored by the Tetley tea brand and known as Storm in a Tea Cup, it received a Dobble card game sponsorship in 2023. The minimum height is 1.1 m (3 ft 7 in).

=== Dark rides and other attractions ===
Name	Picture	Type	Opened	Territory	Manufacturer	Additional Information
Ghost Train		Dark ride	2016 (2017) (2023)	The Dock Yard	Merlin Magic Making, Intamin, Simworx	A multi-sensory dark ride featuring live actors, it was rethemed from Derren Brown's Ghost Train at the beginning of the 2023 season.
Sunset Cinema		4D cinema	1999 (2008) (2014)	Big Easy Boulevard	N/A	Initially opened in 1999, the theatre presented Pirates 4-D and operated until the end of the 2007 season. From the beginning of the 2008 season, it instead featured Time Voyagers, which operated until the end of the 2011 season, after which the venue remained dormant throughout the 2012 and 2013 seasons. It reopened for the 2014 season as part of Angry Birds Land, presenting the Angry Birds 4D Experience. This ran until the end of the 2023 season, coinciding with the rebranding of the area into Big Easy Boulevard for 2024. In 2024, Sunset Cinema is scheduled to show Ready Player One: 4D Experience.
Amity Beach		Artificial beach area with a shallow swimming pool and sand shores.	1979	Amity Cove	Thorpe Park	Originally named "Fantasy Reef" and intended exclusively for families with young children, the attraction operates on an intermittent basis, typically opening only on select days during the summer, subject to suitable weather conditions.

=== Former attractions ===
Name	Picture	Type	Opened	Closed	Territory	Manufacturer	Additional Information
Rumba Rapids (Thunder River)		River rapids ride	1987	2025	The Jungle	Intamin	The ride opened in 1987 as Thunder River and is among the earliest surviving attractions at Thorpe Park. From 2002 to 2006, it was sponsored by Ribena and operated under the name Ribena Rumba Rapids, with the sponsorship concluding in 2007. In 2026, Thorpe Park announced that the ride would not reopen for the season, ending its 39-year operation.
Black Mirror Labyrinth		Maze attraction	2021	2023	Old Town	Merlin Magic Making	A maze that utilised cutting-edge technology and sensory-defying environments. It was based on the Netflix series Black Mirror and closed at the end of the 2023 season.
Angry Birds 4D Experience		4D cinema	2014	2023	Angry Birds Land	Simworx	A 4D cinema that screened the Angry Birds 4D film. It replaced Pirates 4-D and Time Voyagers. The attraction later closed to make way for new experiences.
Wet! Wet! Wet!		Three-lane water slide	1998	2022	Amity	WhiteWater West	A trio of water slides primarily designed for younger children, located in the Amity Beach area. The attraction was rarely operational; as part of Amity Beach.
The Rocky Express		Sea Storm	1989	2021	Old Town	Mack Rides	A family spinning train ride, with a minimum height requirement of 0.9 m (2 ft 11 in). It was removed to make way for Hyperia.
Slammer		Sky Swat	2005	2017	Old Town	S&S – Sansei Technologies	One of only two Sky Swatter's manufactured. It was permanently closed in 2017 after experiencing persistent technical issues throughout much of its operational life. The minimum height requirement was 1.4 m (4 ft 7 in). After years of standing but not operating, its removal was confirmed for the 2024 closed season. As of 15 February 2025, the ride has been fully removed.
Logger's Leap		Log flume	1989	2015	Canada Creek	Mack Rides	It was the tallest log flume in the United Kingdom. It was officially confirmed closed in 2019 and was demolished in late 2022 to make way for Hyperia.
Canada Creek Railway		Miniature railway	1989	2011	Canada Creek	Severn Lamb	A miniature railway running through the former Canada Creek and Thorpe Farm areas.
Pirates 4-D		4D cinema	1999	2007	Calypso Quay	Iwerks Entertainment	A 4D cinema attraction that was replaced by Time Voyagers.
Thorpe Farm		Petting farm	1982	2006	Thorpe Farm	N/A	A petting farm accessible via the Canada Creek Railway or by ferry across Manor Lake. It closed in 2006 owing to low visitor numbers and is now used for storage and horticultural purposes.
Eclipse		Ferris wheel	2003	2004	Lost City	Fabbri Group	A Ferris wheel, which closed at the end of the 2004 season due to negative guest feedback. It was replaced by Rush for the 2005 season. Eclipse was subsequently relocated to Chessington World of Adventures, where it reopened as Peeking Heights in 2005.
Mr Rabbit's Tropical Travels (Magic Mill)		Boat ride	1983	2001	Ranger County	Mack Rides	A scenic boat ride, opened as Magic Mill in 1983. Revamped in 1994 as 'Mr Rabbit's Tropical Travels' as part of Ranger County.
Wicked Witches Haunt (Phantom Fantasia)		Dark ride	1983	2000	Central Park	Mack Rides	The attraction originally opened as Phantom Fantasia in 1983. Revamped as Wicked Witches Haunt in 1994 and destroyed in a major fire on 21 July 2000.
Space Station Zero		Boat ride	1984	1989	Central Park	Mack Rides	An indoor space-themed powered coaster. Coaster relocated outside and revamped as 'Flying Fish' in 1990.

== Park Areas ==
Thorpe Park has featured multiple themed areas and attraction zones throughout its operational history. Between 2008 and 2015, these areas were not identified by name on park maps or signage, although their physical layouts and attractions remained unchanged. From 2016 to 2020, the park reintroduced named zones under the designation “Island Territories,” during which several areas received updated names and thematic identities. From 2021 onwards, named designations were again largely removed from maps and signage; however, new area names have continued to be introduced within the park.

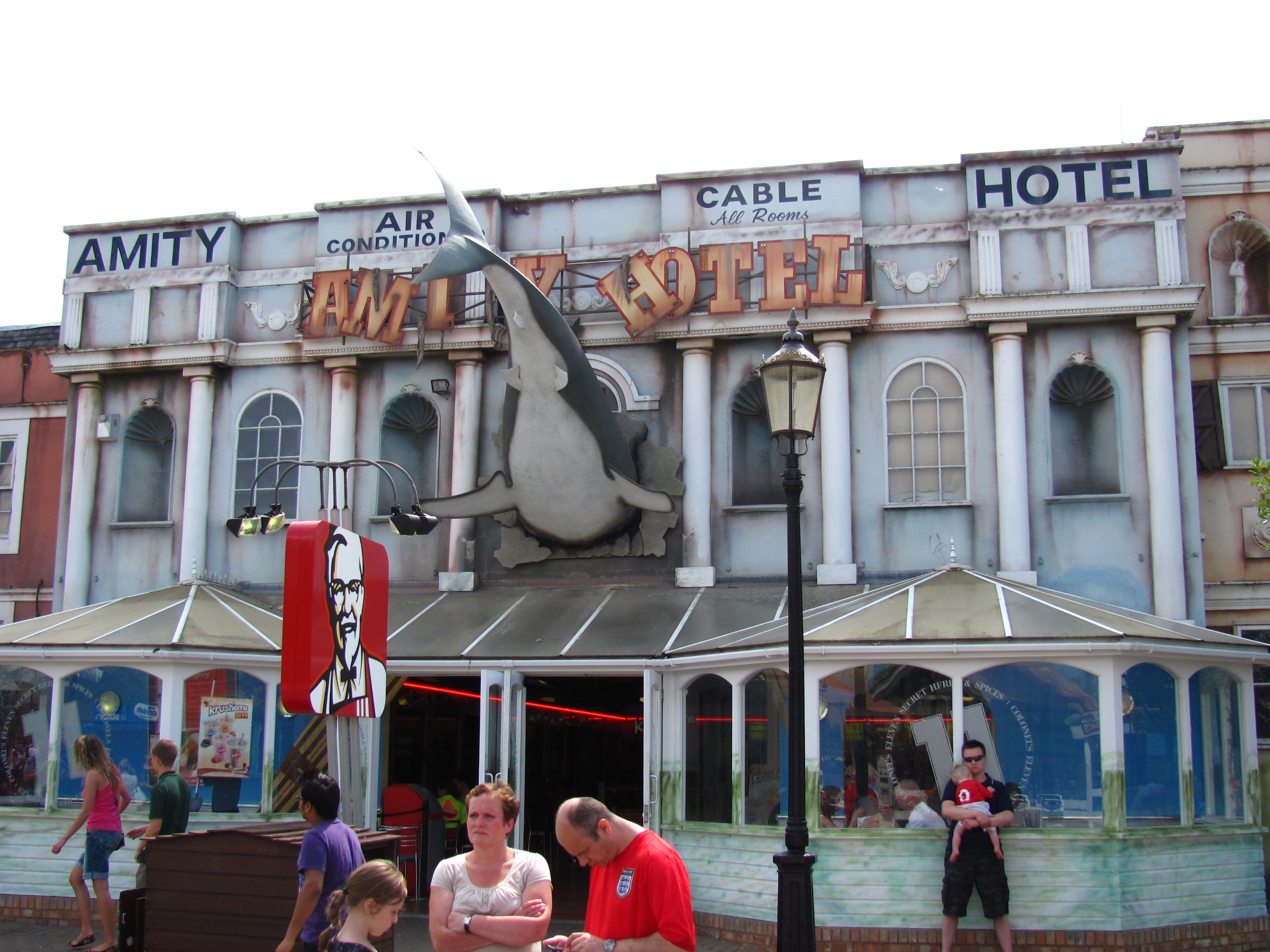
Amity

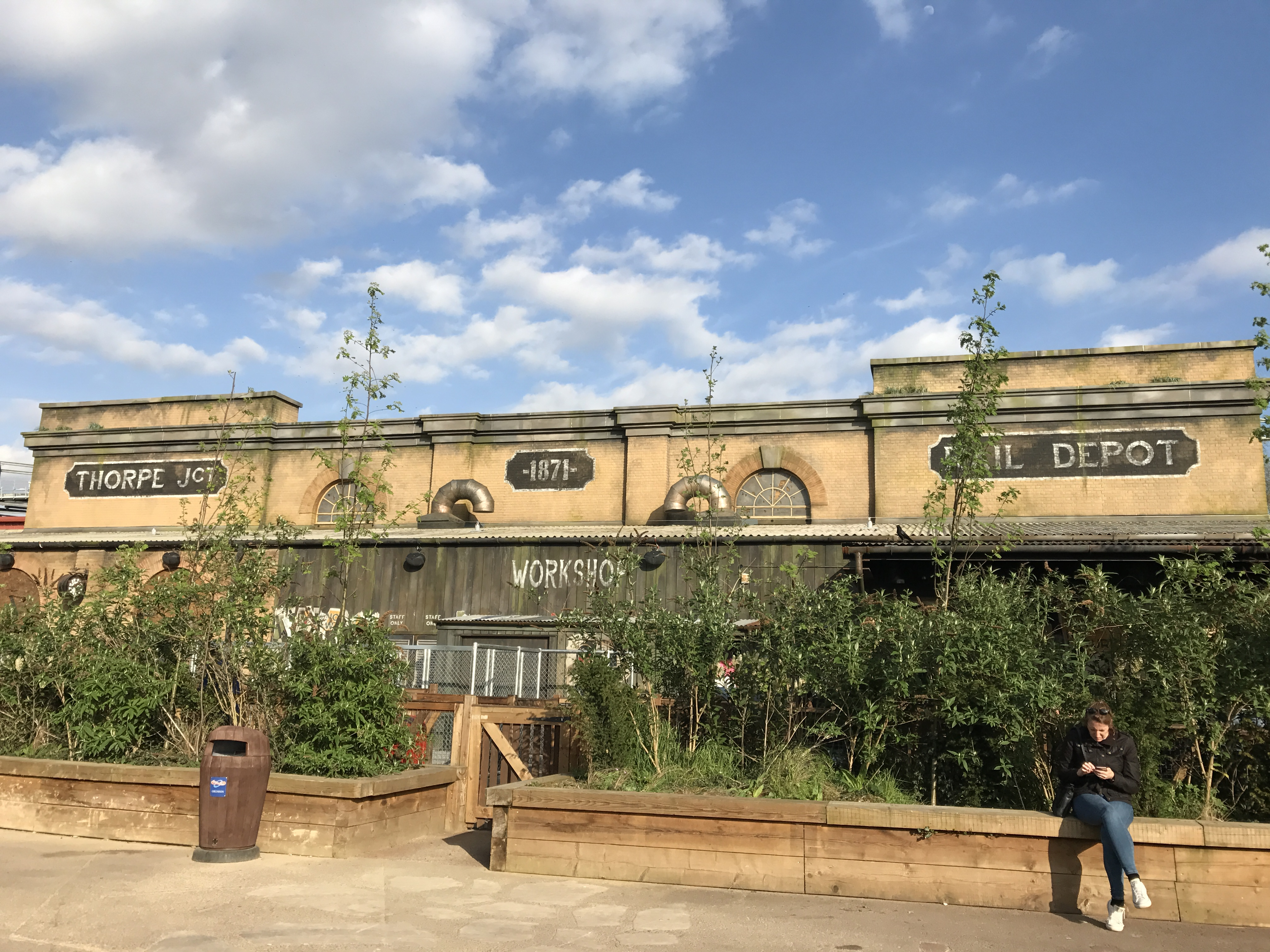
The Dock Yard

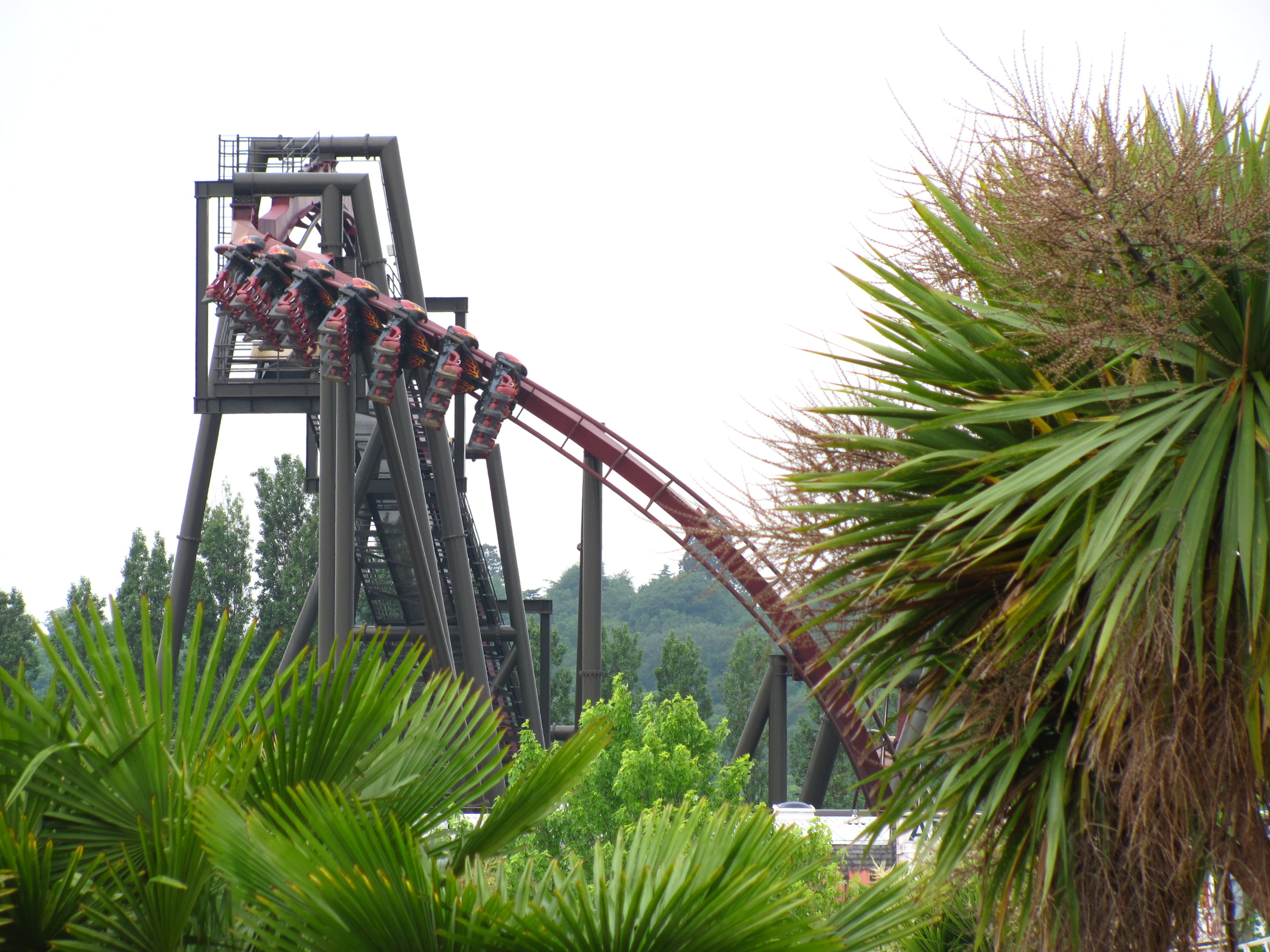
The Jungle

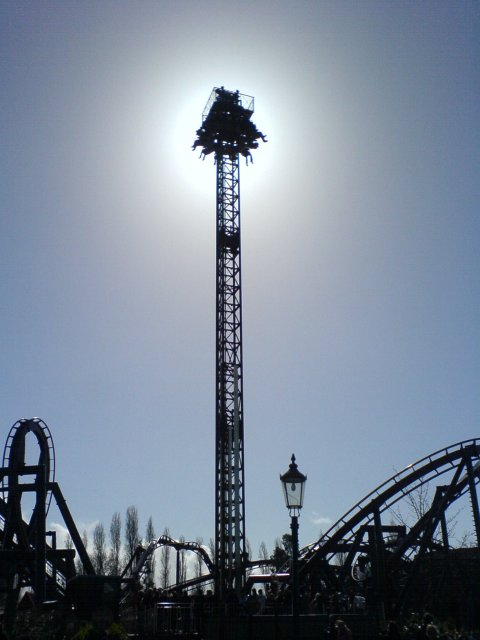
Big Easy Boulevard

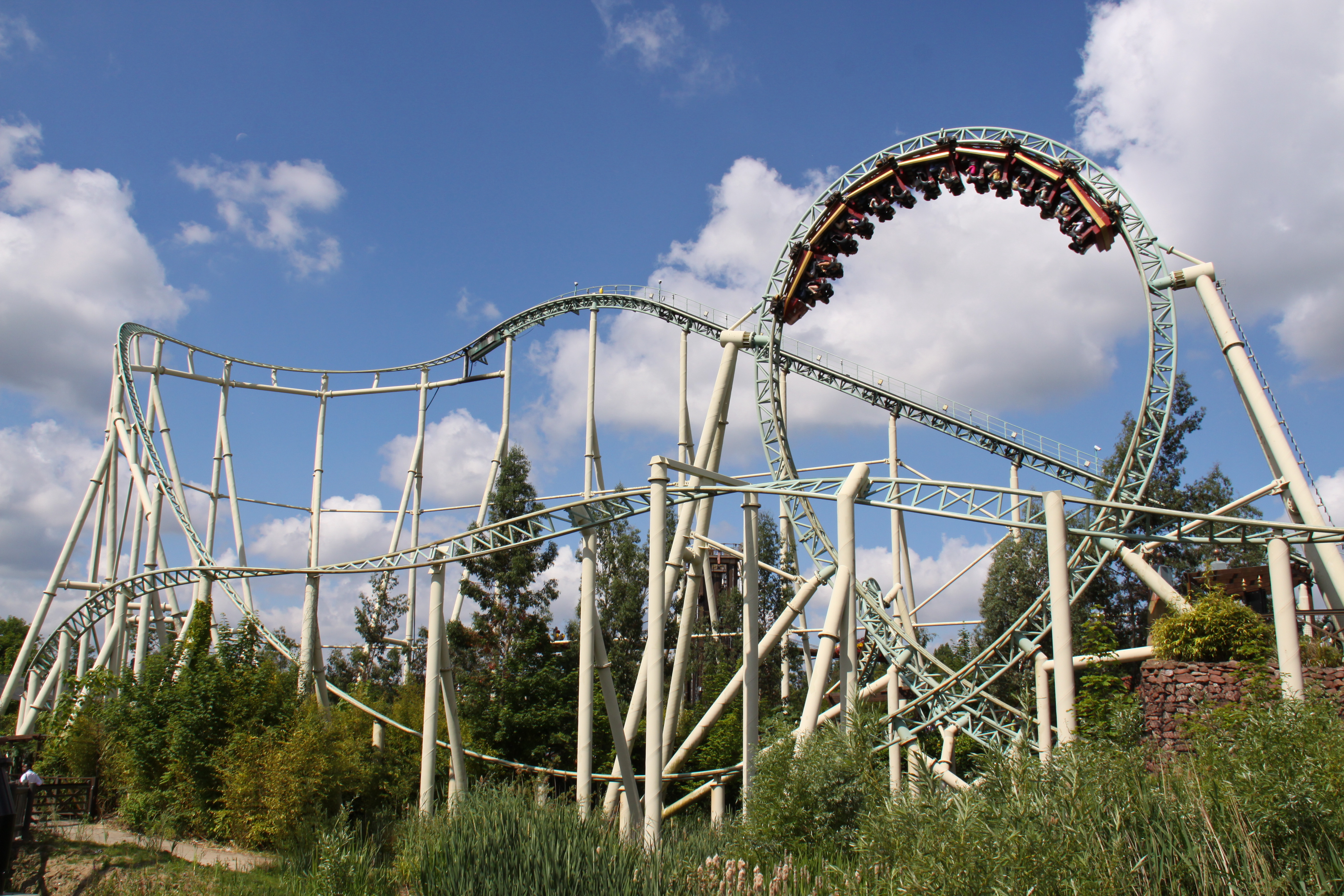
Lost City

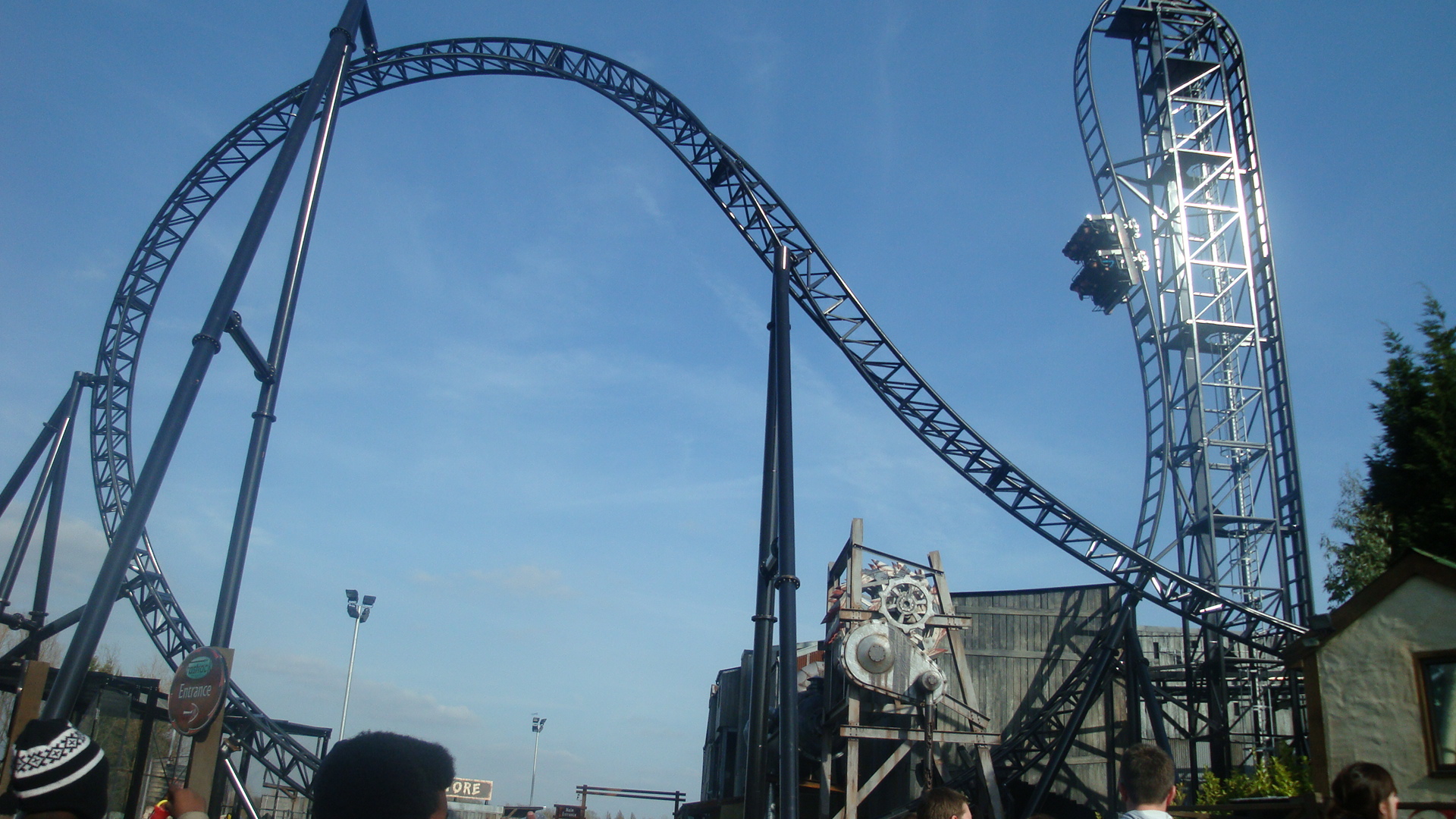
Saw – The Ride

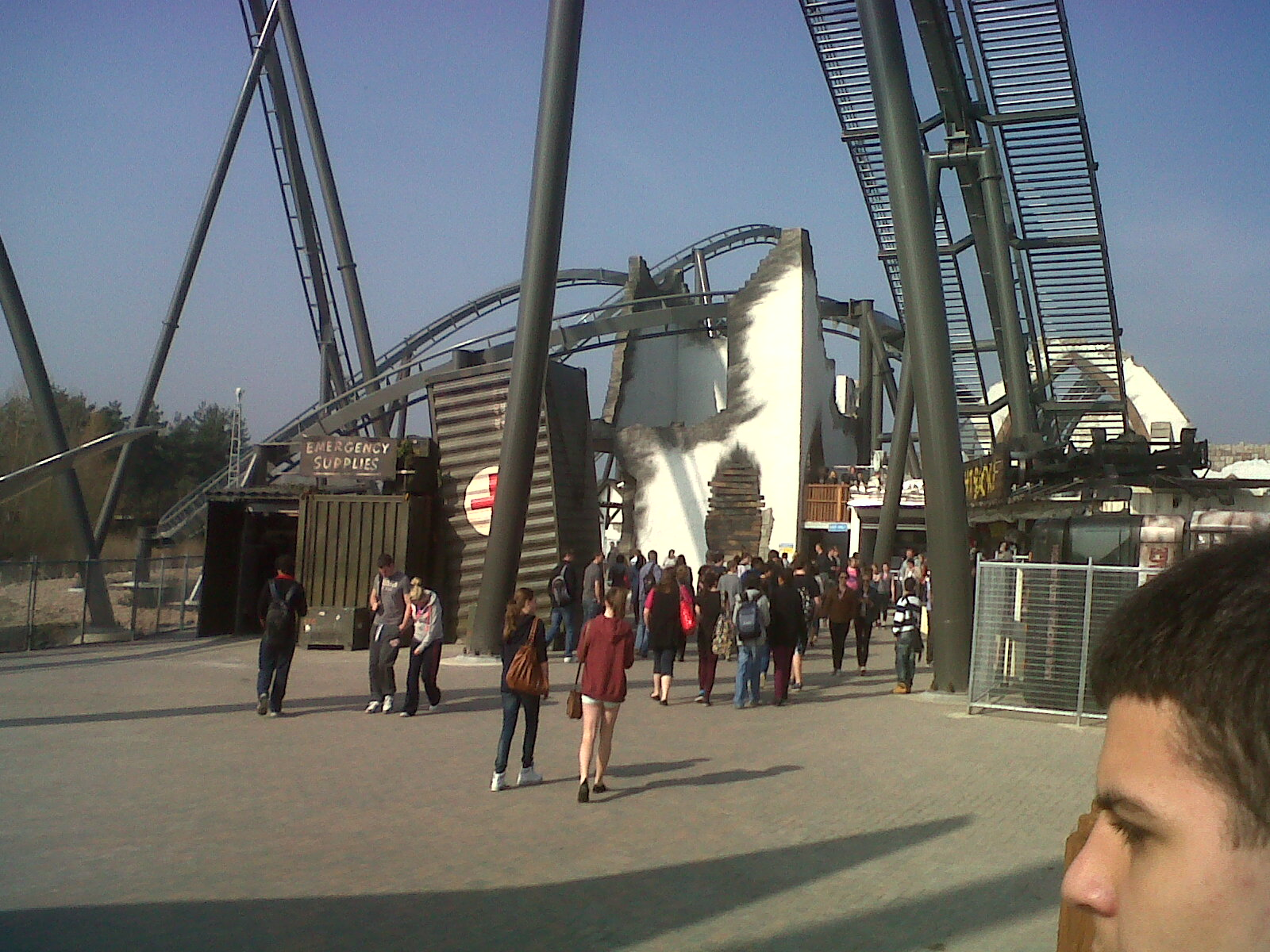
Swarm Island

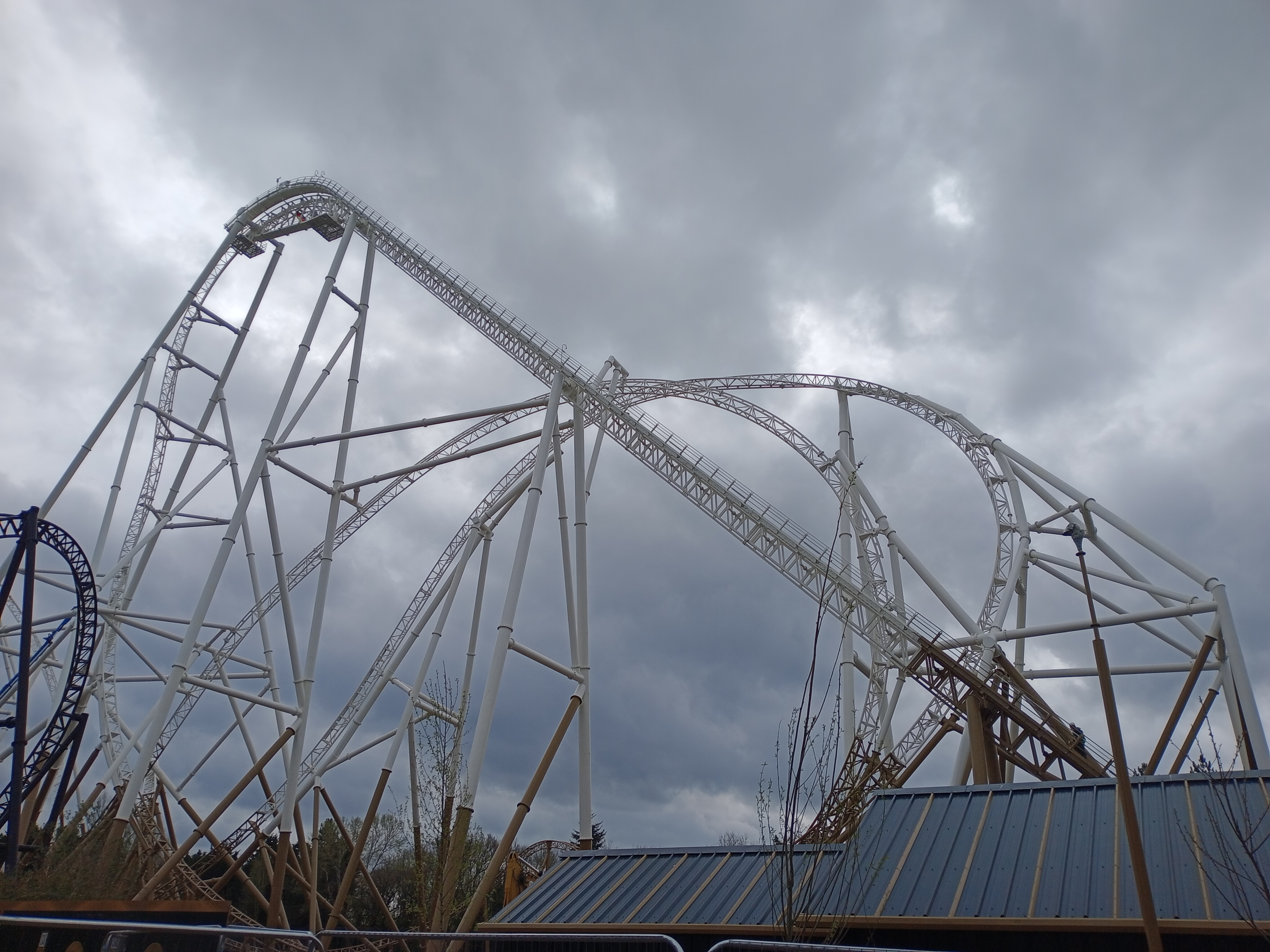
Fearless Valley
- The Dome is the large dome building guests first enter at the park.
- Amity opened with Tidal Wave and now includes Stealth, Depth Charge, Amity Beach, High Striker, Flying Fish, and Storm Surge.
- The Jungle contains Nemesis Inferno, Mr Monkey's Banana Ride, and a street of restaurants.
- Saw – The Ride and Samurai are located in a zone formerly joined with "Old Town".
- Fearless Valley is located towards the back of the park and contains Hyperia.
- Lost City contains Colossus, Rush, Quantum, Vortex, and Zodiac.
- Swarm Island is an area containing The Swarm.
- The Dock Yard is the area immediately outside Ghost Train and includes The Walking Dead: The Ride roller coaster.
- Big Easy Boulevard is located between Amity and The Jungle, and contains Detonator, Big Easy Bumpers, and Sunset Cinema.

=== The Dome ===
The Dome serves as the central hub of the park, accommodating a range of guest and operational facilities. These include Vibes Bar & Kitchen (previously Infinity Bar & Kitchen), an arcade, The Coffee Shack, toilets, lockers, the Island Gift Shop, guest services, first aid, photo points, and staff areas such as the canteen, The Core, and administrative offices.

The structure has undergone several rebrandings over its history. Originally named the Mountbatten Pavilion, it was redesigned in 2000 as Port Atlantis, featuring an underwater Atlantean-themed interior. In 2016, it was renamed Basecamp, during which the underwater theming was gradually removed. Since 2021, the building has been known simply as The Dome.

The Dome also operates outside standard park hours to provide dining and entertainment for guests staying at the Thorpe Shark Cabins, including breakfast service.

=== Amity ===
Amity is themed as a 1950s American fishing village affected by a tidal wave and opened in 2000 alongside the Tidal Wave attraction. The area was originally known as Amity Cove, a name that is still reflected on certain themed signage. In 2006, the area was expanded with the addition of Stealth, set at the Amity Speedway racetrack. Subsequently, Amity incorporated attractions from the former Neptune’s Beach family area, including Depth Charge and the Amity Beach outdoor water park. Amity Cove and Amity Speedway are no longer physically connected, having been separated by Big Easy Boulevard.

The area also includes rides relocated from the former European Park section of the park, such as Flying Fish and Storm in a Teacup, now known as Dobble Tea Party. Flying Fish was originally situated beside Tidal Wave on the site later occupied by Stealth but was removed in 2005 for construction and reopened in 2007 near The Swarm following popular demand. In 2011, the raft ride Storm Surge was relocated from Cypress Gardens in Florida, United States, prior to its retheming at Legoland Florida. Storm Surge occupies the former site of the Octopus Garden children’s area.

=== The Jungle ===
The area’s principal attractions are Nemesis Inferno, an inverted roller coaster manufactured by Bolliger & Mabillard and set within a volcano. The area was formerly known as Calypso Quay and incorporates elements from the former Ranger County family area, including Mr Monkey’s Banana Ride, a small swinging ship, as well as shopfronts and dining facilities retained from the former European Park section of the park.

=== The Dock Yard ===
This area functions primarily as the plaza for Ghost Train, an indoor dark ride. The area also features The Walking Dead: The Ride, an indoor roller coaster. The zone features limited theming beyond its buildings. Historically, the area has been known as The Depot and Thorpe Junction.

=== Lost City ===
The Lost City is themed around the ruins of a newly unearthed Atlantean civilisation, with Colossus as the main attraction since 2002. The area first opened in 2001 with Vortex and Zodiac as its only rides. In 2003, the area was expanded with Quantum (a magic carpet ride) and Eclipse (a Ferris wheel). Eclipse was removed after the 2004 season and relocated to Chessington World of Adventures. It was replaced by Rush, an S&S Screamin' Swing, which opened in 2005. At the end of the 2005 season, Zodiac was removed and replaced with a HUSS Enterprise relocated from Drayton Manor, where it operated as Cyclone before closing due to noise issues. The replacement Zodiac opened without fanfare in 2006.

=== Old Town ===
The attractions in this area are Saw – The Ride, a Gerstlauer Euro-Fighter roller coaster featuring a 100 ft (30 m)-tall, 100° beyond-vertical drop. The ride is themed to the Saw horror franchise and is set within a derelict warehouse and sawmill. The flat ride Samurai was relocated from Chessington World of Adventures in 2004.

The majority of the area, now replaced by Hyperia, was originally named Canada Creek and featured the log flume Logger's Leap. The area opened in 1989 and had a Canadian aesthetic, though this shifted towards a Western-style theme over time. Logger's Leap ceased running after the 2015 season and the area was renamed "Old Town" (incorporating the adjacent Saw area) in 2016, though there were no changes to the area theme. The area also hosted Black Mirror Labyrinth between 2021 and 2023.

The main Old Town area closed after the 2021 season to be redeveloped for Hyperia, which opened in 2024 and the area was subsequently renamed Fearless Valley. Saw and Samurai continue to operate in a separate now unnamed zone, following the disuse of area names from park maps from 2021.

=== Fearless Valley ===
The main attraction in this area is Hyperia, the United Kingdom's tallest and fastest rollercoaster. Fearless Valley also includes a Burger King, Victorious Games, the Hyporium gift shop, Cloud Nine Treats, and toilets themed to Hyperia.

=== Swarm Island ===
Swarm Island serves as the plaza for The Swarm, a wing coaster manufactured by Bolliger & Mabillard that opened in 2012. The area was built on land reclaimed from surrounding lakes and is themed to depict the aftermath of an apocalyptic event or alien invasion caused by “The Swarm.” Key thematic elements include a crashed aeroplane, damaged emergency vehicles such as a helicopter and fire engine, a partially destroyed church that functions as the ride station, and additional ruined structures. Several guest and operational facilities are integrated into these props, including a shop housed within a shipping container and the ride control room located in an overturned police trailer suspended within the church roof.

=== Timeline of park areas ===
Years areas opened
1979	1980	1981	1982	1983	1984	1985	1986	1987	1988	1989	1990	1991	1992	1993	1994	1995	1996	1997	1998	1999	2000	2001	2002	2003	2004	2005	2006	2007	2008	2009	2010	2011	2012	2013	2014	2015	2016	2017	2018	2019	2020	2021	2022	2023	2024	2025
Mountbatten Pavilion																						Port Atlantis															Port and Basecamp					The Dome				
Invaders of Britain / Our Heritage																																														
Water Gardens										Nature World																																				
Model World																																														
		Childrens Ride Area											Octopus Garden																																	
			Thorpe Farm																																											
				Treasure Island																																										
				Central Park																			Calypso Quay														The Jungle									
				Central Park																															Angry Birds Land										Big Easy Boulevard	
										Canada Creek																											Old Town								Fearless Valley	
												Fantasy Reef										Neptune’s Kingdom																								
															Ranger County																															
																					Amity Cove																Amity Beach	Amity								
																						Lost City																								
																																					Swarm Island									
																																							The Dock Yard							

Previous named area

Current named area

== Records held by the park ==
- Nemesis Inferno is the first inverted coaster to feature interlocking corkscrews (in the same layout).
- Additionally, the world record for "most naked people on a roller coaster" was set on Nemesis Inferno in May 2004.
- The Swarm opened as Europe's tallest wing coaster and the first coaster in the world to feature the "wing over drop".
- Saw – The Ride was marketed as having the world's steepest "freefall" drop, and as the world's first horror movie themed roller coaster. Saw - The Ride was not actually the steepest roller coaster in the world when it opened in March 2009 - Steel Hawg at Indiana Beach had opened the previous year with a steeper 111° drop. However, whilst Steel Hawg's drop has brakes on it, Saw's drop is brakeless - hence it being marketed as having the steepest freefall drop. This particular accolade was taken by The Monster in 2016 (and, as of 2022, is held by Defiance).
- Colossus held the world record for the most inversions on a rollercoaster when it opened in 2002, with 10 inversions. This record was matched in 2006 by 10 Inversion Roller Coaster (an exact clone of Colossus) and then beaten in 2013 by The Smiler at Alton Towers, with 14 inversions.
- Stealth was the United Kingdom's fastest roller coaster, launching from 0–80 mph (0–129 km/h) in 1.8 seconds (as of 2024 this record has been taken by Hyperia) Standing at 205.1 ft (62.5 m), it is also the United Kingdom's third tallest roller coaster (behind The Big One and Hyperia).
- Tidal Wave opened as Europe's tallest water ride.
- Hyperia is the tallest roller coaster in the UK at 236 ft (72 m), and the fastest roller coaster in the UK at 81 mph (130 km/h). Hyperia also contains Europe's tallest inversion at 168 ft (51.2 m), and a world's first outer-banked turn inversion. Thorpe Park also claim that Hyperia has 14.8s of airtime being the UK's most weightless coaster. However, this is debated as they have included a 3s stall in this statistic, which is widely regarded as hangtime and not airtime.
- Stealth is the world's fastest accelerating rollercoaster (0–80 mph (0–129 km/h) in 1.8 seconds) with the announced closure of Do-Dodonpa at Fuji-Q Highland on 13 March 2024.

== Fright Nights ==
Fright Nights, formerly styled as "Fright Nites", is Thorpe Park's annual Halloween event and one of the largest Halloween events of its kind in the United Kingdom. The event has run at the park since 2002, celebrating Halloween with extended opening hours and a range of temporary Halloween attractions. Roaming actors in costume or make-up can also be found around the park. During Fright Nights, the park operates with extended opening hours and features a series of themed “scare mazes”. In previous years, the park also offered an additional paid experience titled Face It Alone, which allowed an individual guest to navigate a scare maze alone; participation required the signing of a liability disclaimer.

In 2013, Fright Nights was rebranded to feature a horror film–themed format under a three-year licensing agreement with Lionsgate. As part of this rebranding, all existing Fright Nights attractions were discontinued, with the exception of The Asylum and Saw: Alive, and replaced by new scare attractions based on popular horror films produced or distributed by Lionsgate.

In 2014, following the opening of the Thorpe Shark Hotel, Thorpe Park introduced two overnight scare experiences for guests. The first involved a “night terror” character entering guest rooms during the night, while the second, called the “Extra Cut,” staged a scenario in which guests were “kidnapped” from their rooms and pursued throughout the park.

In 2017, Fright Nights was redesigned with a Walking Dead theme in collaboration with The Walking Dead. Two new attractions based on the series were introduced to coincide with the premiere of its eighth season. Existing attractions from previous years, including Saw: Alive, The Big Top, and Platform 15, were retained, while Containment returned as a paid upcharge experience.

In 2020, restrictions associated with the COVID-19 pandemic limited Fright Nights operations to two scare mazes: Platform 15 and Roots of Evil, both of which were primarily outdoors. For the first time, a range of scare zones was introduced across the park, including The Swarm: Invasion on Swarm Island, Creek Freaks Unchained in Old Town, The Fearstival Arena in the Dockyard, The Howling of LycanThorpe High in Lost City on the site typically used for a scare maze near Zodiac and Rush, and Terror at Amity High, returning for its third year on Stealth Plaza. Additionally, The Crows were introduced as roaming scarecrows, stationed at key locations but moving throughout the park and interacting with other scare zones.

Fright Nights attraction history
Year	Attractions (number of seasons)											
2002	THE FREEZER (3)	Freakshow 3D (3)										
2003	THE FREEZER (3)	Freakshow 3D (3)										
2004	THE FREEZER (3)	Freakshow 3D (3)	Carnival of the Bizarre (5)									
2005	The Asylum (9)	Hellgate (6)	Carnival of the Bizarre (5)									
2006	The Asylum (9)	Hellgate (6)	Carnival of the Bizarre (5)	Se7en (6)								
2007	The Asylum (9)	Hellgate (6)	Carnival of the Bizarre (5)	Se7en (6)								
2008	The Asylum (9)	Hellgate (6)	Carnival of the Bizarre (5)	Se7en (6)	The Curse (5)							
2009	The Asylum (9)	Hellgate (6)		Se7en (6)	The Curse (5)							
2010	The Asylum (9)	Hellgate (6)	SAW: Alive (9)	Se7en (6)	The Curse (5)	Dead End (1)						
2011	The Asylum (9)	Experiment 10 (2)	SAW: Alive (9)	Se7en (6)	The Curse (5)							
2012	The Asylum (9)	Experiment 10 (2)	SAW: Alive (9)	The Passing (1)	The Curse (5)							
2013	The Asylum (9)	My Bloody Valentine (3)	SAW: Alive (9)	Cabin in the Woods (4)	Blair Witch (4)							
2014	Studio 13 (1)	My Bloody Valentine (3)	SAW: Alive (9)	Cabin in the Woods (4)	Blair Witch (4)	Extra Cut (1)						
2015	Containment (5)	My Bloody Valentine (3)	SAW: Alive (9)	Cabin in the Woods (4)	Blair Witch (4)	The Big Top (3)						
2016	Containment (5)	Platform 15 (5)	SAW: Alive (9)	Cabin in the Woods (4)	Blair Witch (4)	The Big Top (3)						
2017	Containment (5)	Platform 15 (5)	SAW: Alive (9)	The Walking Dead: Living Nightmare (3)	The Walking Dead: Sanctum (1)	The Big Top (3)						
2018	Containment (5)	Platform 15 (5)	SAW: Alive (9)	The Walking Dead: Living Nightmare (3)	The Walking Dead: Do or Die (2)	The Big Top: Showtime (1)	Blair Witch (2)	Terror at Amity High: High School SUCKS! (3)	Screamplexx Cinema (3)	Vulcan Peak (1)	Dead Creek Woods (1)	
2019	Containment (5)	Platform 15 (5)	Creek Freak Massacre (1)	The Walking Dead: Living Nightmare (3)	The Walking Dead: Do or Die (2)		Blair Witch (2)	Terror at Amity High: High School SUCKS! (3)	Screamplexx Cinema (3)			
2020	The Swarm: Invasion (2)	Platform 15 (5)	Roots of Evil (1)	The Howling of LycanThorpe High (1)	Creek Freaks Unchained [as a Scare Zone] (2)	The Fearstival Arena (1)	The Crows (2)	Terror at Amity High: High School SUCKS! (3)	Screamplexx Cinema (3)			
2021	The Swarm: Invasion (2)	Platform 15: End of the Line (1)	Creek Freak Massacre (1)	Amity High vs LycanThorpe: LoveBITES! (1)	Creek Freaks Unchained [as a Scare Zone] (2)	Trailers (6)	The Crows (2)	The Crows of Mawkin Meadow (6)	Birthday Bash (2)	Legacy (2)		
2022	Survival Games (5)	The Terminal (1)	Creek Freak Massacre: The Final Cut (1)	Amity High vs LycanThorpe: Graduation SUCKS! (1)	Creek Freaks Unchained [as a Roaming Team] (1)	Trailers (6)	Death's Doors (2)	The Crows of Mawkin Meadow (6)	Birthday Bash (2)	Legacy (2)		
2023	Survival Games (5)	Creature Campus: Trouble's Brewing (1)	Lucifer's Lair (4)	Stitches (4)		Trailers (6)	Death's Doors (2)	The Crows of Mawkin Meadow (6)				
2024	Survival Games (5)	Creature Campus: Looks Can Kill! (1)	Lucifer's Lair (4)	Stitches (4)	DeadBeat (3)	Trailers (6)	IT: The 4D Experience (2)	The Crows of Mawkin Meadow (6)				
2025	Survival Games (5)	Creature Campus: Shock to the System (1)	Lucifer's Lair (4)	Stitches (4)	DeadBeat (3)	Trailers (6)	IT: The 4D Experience (2)	The Crows of Mawkin Meadow (6)	Purgatory Town (2)			
2026	Survival Games (5)	Creature Campus: Reunion Reckoning (1)	Lucifer's Lair (4)	Stitches (4)	DeadBeat (3)	Trailers (6)	The Conjuring 4D Experience (1)	The Crows of Mawkin Meadow (6)	Purgatory Town (2)		Tenement (1)	Rebel Ball (1)

– Previous Fright Night attraction. – Current Fright Night attraction.

== Thorpe Shark Cabins ==
Guests can stay on-site at the Thorpe Shark Cabins, comprising 90 rooms converted from shipping containers and linked to facilities in the adjacent Dome. The accommodation takes its name from its shark-head entrance feature, constructed from recycled park signage.

The hotel initially opened in 2013 as The Crash Pad, operated by the external company Snoozebox. The temporary development was purchased by the park the following year and rebranded as the Thorpe Shark Hotel.

Thorpe Park had originally planned to construct a permanent 250-bed hotel as early as 2006. It would have been located on the opposite side of the lake, on the site of former excavation works, and feature a lakeside bar, health club, and restaurant. Planning permission was granted in 2011.

The development was proposed again following the installation of The Crash Pad to "test market conditions". The park received planning permission to construct the permanent hotel in 2014, with construction planned to begin in 2016 and an opening scheduled for 2018. However, the hotel was never built, and the Shark Hotel’s planning permission was instead extended by ten years.

In 2023, new Swarm, Nemesis Inferno, and Stealth-themed rooms opened in the Thorpe Shark Cabins. They feature bespoke theming and provide unlimited fastrack access to each room’s associated roller coaster on the second day of a stay.

In 2024, new Colossus and Hyperia-themed rooms opened in the Thorpe Shark Cabins.

== Transport ==
There are no direct rail connections to Thorpe Park; the nearest railway station is Chertsey, situated approximately 2km away.

Thorpe Park is served by the 950 express bus, which departs from Staines railway station, providing connections from London Waterloo and Reading. Other local bus routes serving the park include routes 461 and 446. Additionally, there is the seasonal 951 bus between Watford and Thorpe Park, operating once daily (arriving in the morning and departing in the evening), with two return journeys during Fright Nights.

== See also ==
- Merlin Entertainments
- The Tussauds Group
- RMC Group
- "Thorpe Park", an episode of The Inbetweeners in which the main characters visit Thorpe Park.
- Primeval – the third episode of Series 2 featured the park under a fictitious name.
- Staines railway station
- Chertsey railway station
- Alton Towers
- Chessington World of Adventures
- Drayton Manor Theme Park
