= Rush (Thorpe Park) =

Screamin' Swing flat ride

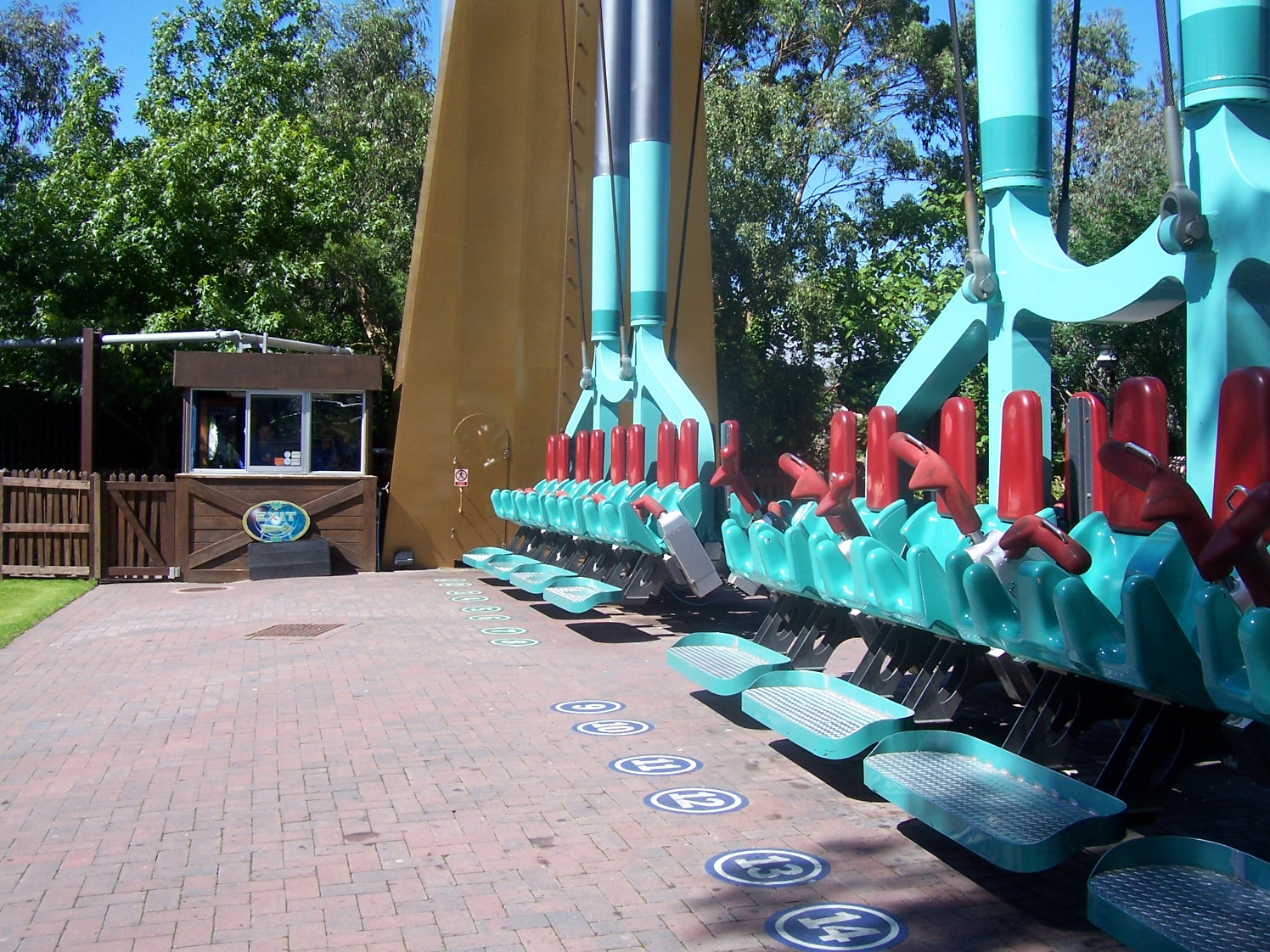

Thorpe Park
- Area: Lost City
- Coordinates: 51.40439°N 0.51237°W
- Status: Operating
- Opening date: 27 May 2005
- Replaced: Eclipse

Ride statistics
- Attraction type: Screamin' Swing
- Manufacturer: S&S – Sansei Technologies
- Height: 105 ft (32 m)
- Speed: 45 mph (72 km/h)
- Capacity: 768 riders per hour
- Vehicles: 2
- Riders per vehicle: 16
- Rows: 2
- Riders per row: 8
- Duration: 1 Minute
- Height restriction: 130 cm (4 ft 3 in)
- Fastrack available
- Wheelchair accessible
- Must transfer from wheelchair

Rush is a Screamin' Swing ride at Thorpe Park in Chertsey, Surrey which opened at the park alongside another S&S – Sansei Technologies thrill ride, Slammer, in 2005. At the time of its opening, it was the tallest ride of its type in the world. It is the only Screamin' Swing in the United Kingdom.

== Construction ==
Construction for Rush started late 2004, after Eclipse, a Ferris wheel, was removed. It was originally meant to have four air tanks, instead of two. It took around 4 months to construct and test. The ride was installed by Ride Entertainment Group.

== Ride Opening ==
The grand opening for Rush was at midday on 27 May 2005. After testing all through the morning, it opened, only to break down after four ride cycles. It was tested for over an hour, and reopened again. As the ride has two swings which swing in opposite directions, it is thought the ride needed to close due to the swings falling out of sync, which caused the ride to operate with one swing.

== Ride Experience ==
The ride begins with a series of low swings that progressively increase in height. After approximately five swings, the ride reaches its maximum height of 75 ft (23 m) and its top speed of 50 mph (80 km/h), with the swings reaching an angle of roughly 104 degrees. At the apex of each swing, riders experience forces of up to 3.5 G. Following four swings at full height, the ride decelerates rapidly to a stop.

The ride experience is influenced by its use of lap bar restraints rather than over-the-shoulder restraints, providing riders with a greater sense of freedom and exposure. The ride is powered by compressed air, which produces significant noise during operation. While some guests consider this sound to enhance the experience, it has also been criticised for its volume.

The ride is capable of operating with a single swing if park attendance is low or if the second swing is out of service. Operating with one swing allows for a capacity of approximately 375 riders per hour, while both swings in operation increase the capacity to around 768 riders per hour.

== 2008 Incident ==
On 27 May 2008, a piece of metal detached from the ride while it was in operation with guests on board. The ride was immediately halted and closed for inspection. The incident was recorded and subsequently uploaded to YouTube. The detached component was reconstructed and refitted, and new platforms were installed. The ride was covered in scaffolding for approximately one week during the repair work and reopened shortly thereafter. There were no injuries reported.
