= Peeking Heights =

Former Ferris wheel at Chessington World of Adventures

Coordinates: 51.348°N 0.320°W

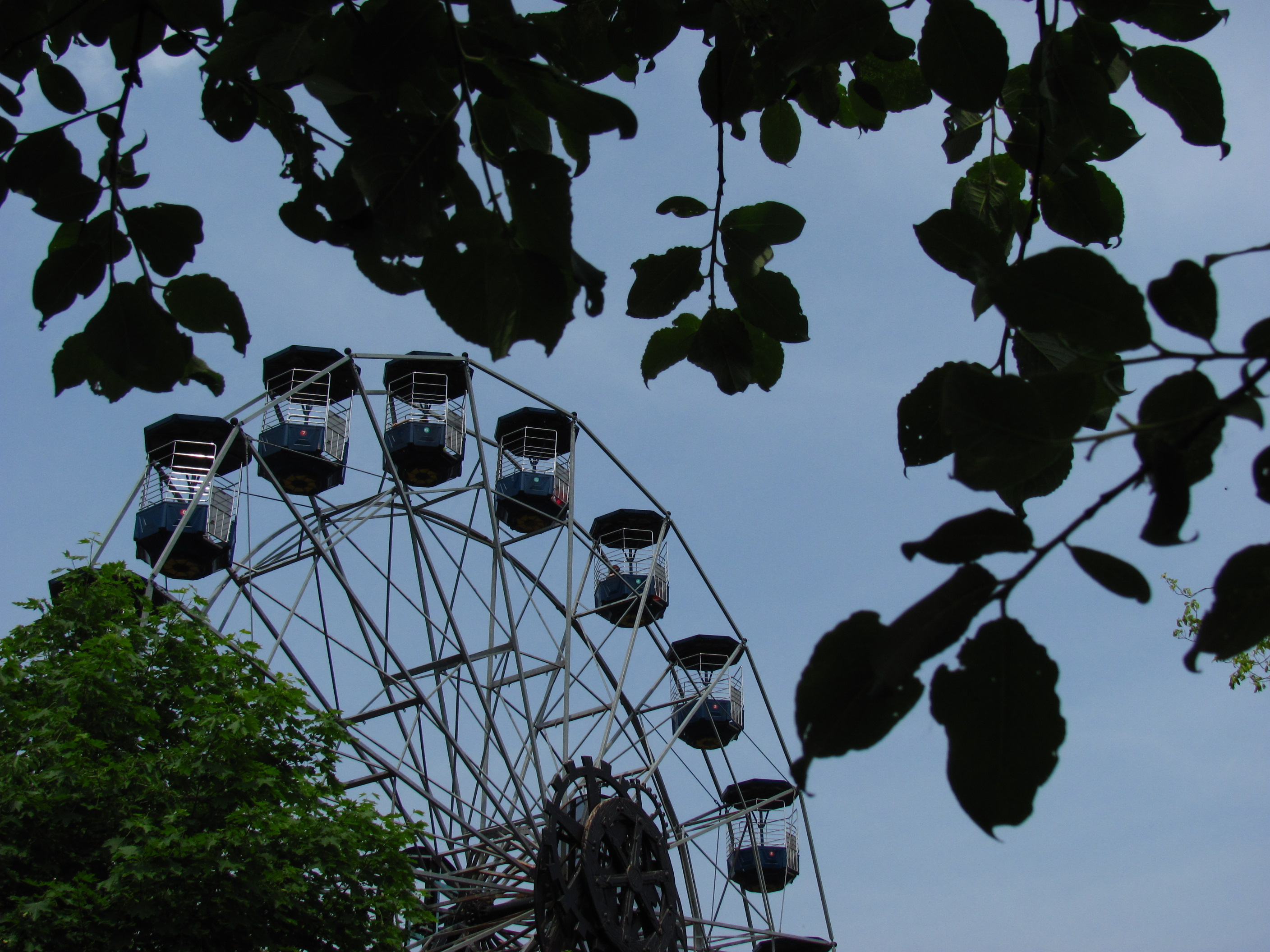

Chessington World of Adventures
- Area: Mystic East
- Status: Removed
- Opening date: 2005
- Closing date: 10 September 2017
- Replaced: Samurai

Thorpe Park
- Name: Eclipse
- Area: Lost City
- Status: Relocated to Chessington World of Adventures
- Opening date: 2003
- Closing date: 2004
- Replaced by: Rush

Ride statistics
- Attraction type: Ferris wheel
- Manufacturer: Fabbri Group
- Height: 25 m (82 ft)
- Vehicles: 18 pods

Peeking Heights was a Ferris wheel that opened in 2005 at the long-lived Mystic East area of Chessington World of Adventures Resort, where it provided views of the entire park and on a clear day a view of London, including Wembley Stadium.

It was relocated from Thorpe Park Resort where it was known as 'Eclipse' until it moved to Chessington. It was 25 metres (82 ft) tall, had 18 pods, and was manufactured by Fabbri Group. The attraction closed in September 2017 to make way for some new Amur Tiger enclosures in a new themed area called 'Land of the Tiger' which opened in 2018 and is a retheme of the parks 'Mystic East' area, the parks log flume attraction in this area called 'Dragon Falls' was also re-themed and re-named 'Tiger Rock'.
