= Rumba Rapids =

River rapids water ride

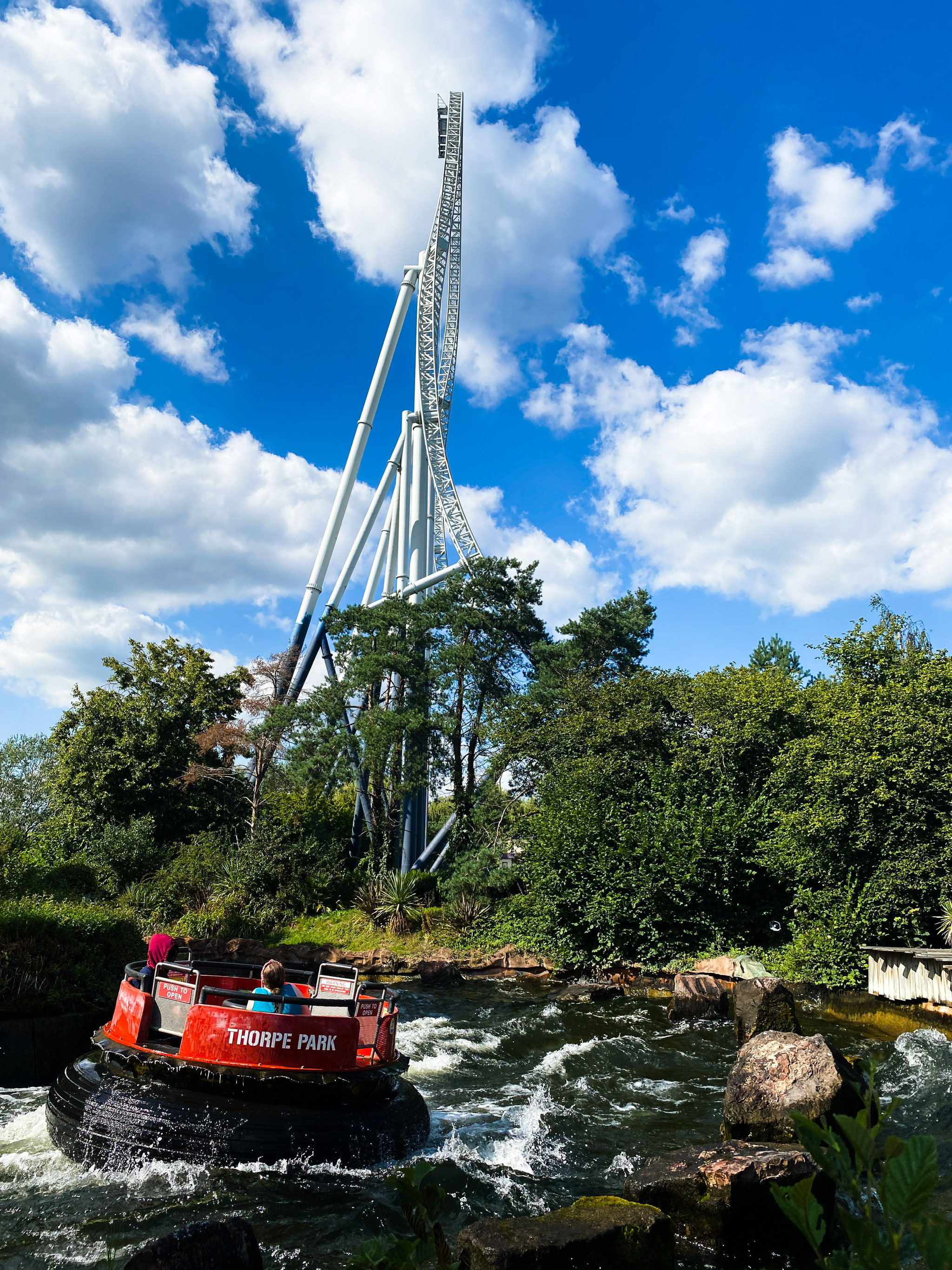
- Rumba Rapids with Stealth in the background, operating in August 2021.

Thorpe Park
- Area: The Jungle
- Coordinates: 51°24′17″N 0°30′47″W
- Status: Closed
- Opening date: 1987
- Closing date: August 31, 2025

General statistics
- Type: River rafting ride
- Manufacturer: Intamin
- Lift system: Yes
- Length: 460 m (1,510 ft)
- Capacity: 1000 riders per hour
- Duration: 4 min 20 sec
- Fastrack available
- Must transfer from wheelchair

Rumba Rapids (formerly known as Thunder River) was a river rapids ride manufactured by Intamin at Thorpe Park in Chertsey, United Kingdom.

Each boat could accommodate up to 8 riders.

The attraction opened in 1987 and remained in operation until the end of the 2025 season.

== History ==
Originally opening in 1987 as Thunder River. It was the park’s second-oldest ride prior to its closure in 2026 and the first Intamin river rapids ride in the United Kingdom, followed shortly by Congo River Rapids at Alton Towers. The original attraction featured bright yellow boats, rockwork along the trough, and an enclosed tunnel section. Thunder River was significantly more aggressive than later iterations, producing heavier splashes that soaked riders.

In 2002, the ride underwent refurbishment and was rethemed as Ribena Rumba Rapids to reflect sponsorship by Ribena. The update introduced a vibrant colour scheme, new boats sourced from a different manufacturer, and modifications to the ride system to create a more family-oriented experience. Wave machines were replaced and additional water effects added to compensate for the reduced intensity of the rapids.

After Ribena’s sponsorship ended in 2006, the ride was renamed Rumba Rapids for the 2007 season. All branding associated with Ribena was removed, although some scenery was only partially painted over. The boats received updated graphics featuring the Thorpe Park name and individual boat numbers. Subsequently, the attraction underwent extensive refurbishment, with the queue repainted in a natural brown palette inspired by the original Thunder River. Ribena-themed decorations along the course were removed, with the tunnel receiving new lighting. Several trees around the layout were removed, and stumps on the final bend were treated with a charred effect to complement the nearby volcano feature of Nemesis Inferno.

Following a 2017 incident on Splash Canyon at Drayton Manor, safety regulations for rapids rides were revised industry-wide. In 2018, one Rumba Rapids boat was modified as a trial to include a higher backrest, a central grab handle, and magnetic entry and exit gates to reduce the risk of riders falling overboard. From the 2019 season onward, these features were permanently implemented on all boats.

For the 2023 season, the attraction was repainted in its original Rumba Rapids colour scheme.

The ride operated to the public for the final time on August 31st, 2025.

On 12 March 2026, ahead of the 2026 season starting, Thorpe Park released an official statement alongside Jack Silkstone, confirming the ride had permanently closed. The park has stated ‘Whilst we don’t have plans to share just yet on what’s next, we’re always reviewing our line-up of world-class rides and attractions to make sure Thorpe Park remains the UK’s most thrilling theme park’.

The attraction has since remained SBNO (Standing But Not Operating), despite the confirmation of closure.

== Ride experience ==
The ride boats began at the highest point on a large turntable conveyor belt, which also served as the station and loading area for guests. Upon dispatch, the boats turned sharply to the left, followed by a gentle descending curve leading into a right-hand hairpin turn. They then proceeded into a tunnel featuring a near-miss waterfall effect and a gradual right-hand bend. Exiting the tunnel, the boats entered a 'wave maker' section with jagged rocks and artificial waves simulating rapids. The course then passed under a bridge that served as the entrance queue and exit, followed by a right-hand turn, an onboard photo opportunity, and finally the lowest point of the course. The boats were subsequently returned to the turntable via a conveyor belt lift supported by wooden beams, allowing guests to disembark.

== Incident ==
In the ride's opening year of 1987 a 7-year-old boy was thrown from a boat and lost an ear..
