= Storm Surge (ride) =

River rafting water ride

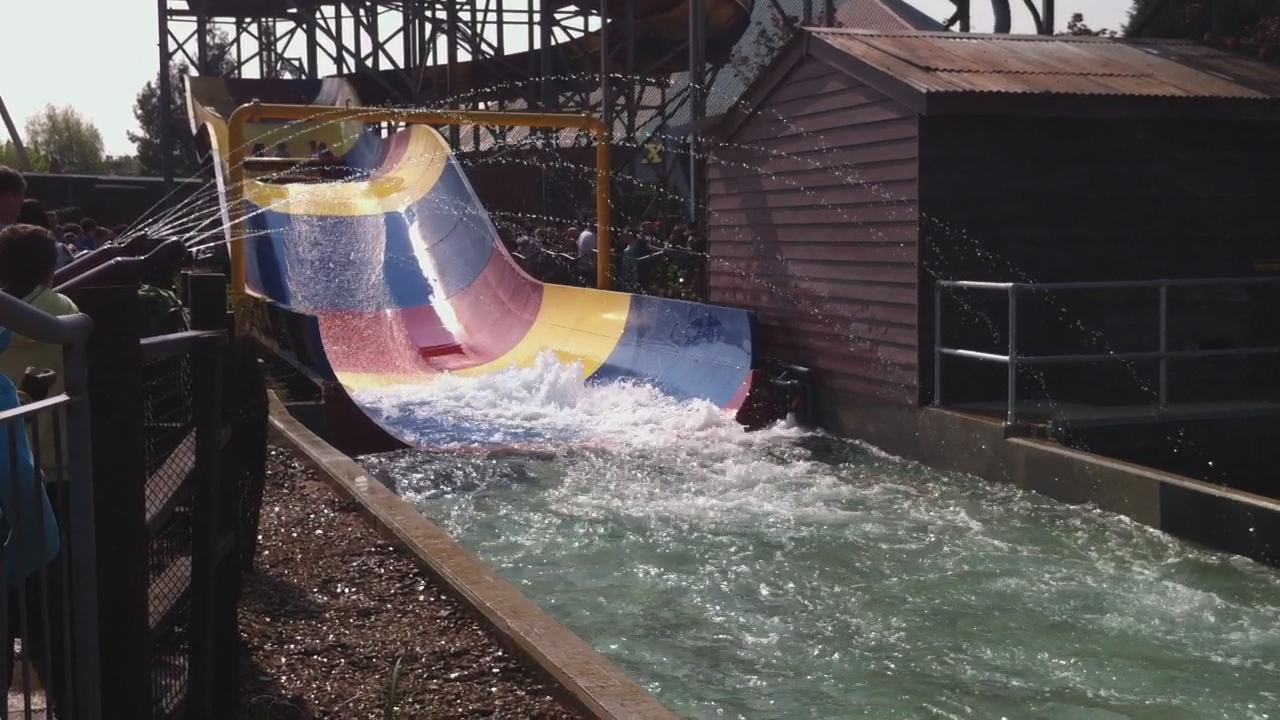

Thorpe Park
- Area: Amity
- Coordinates: 51°24′14.77″N 0°30′47.53″W
- Status: Operating
- Opening date: 17 March 2011
- Replaced: Octopus Garden

General statistics
- Type: River rafting ride
- Manufacturer: WhiteWater West
- Model: Spinning Rapids Ride
- Course: SK-75
- Lift system: Conveyor belt lift
- Height: 19.5 m (64 ft)
- Length: 142.3 m (467 ft)
- Capacity: 400 riders per hour
- Duration: 5:00
- Boats: 8 boats. Riders are arranged 6 across in a single row for a total of 6 riders per boat.
- Height restriction: 110 cm (3 ft 7 in)
- Fastrack available
- Wheelchair accessible
- Must transfer from wheelchair

Storm Surge is a 'Spinning Rapids' water ride at Thorpe Park, Surrey, United Kingdom manufactured by WhiteWater West. It is located in the Amity area of the park, in the vicinity of the park's Tidal Wave-themed ride. Storm Surge, which opened in March 2011 with a fairground ride theme, makes use of the Tidal Wave water which has washed into Amity, as the town enters the 1970s. The ride was relocated from the transforming Cypress Gardens Florida, which was acquired by Merlin Entertainments to be turned into Legoland Florida.

== Ride experience ==
The ride contains a 19.5-metre lift hill, and gradually 'spins' to the bottom of the slide, as velcro has been added to make the model of ride (which is usually marketed towards families) more intense, to suit the park's own target audience. As the ride itself does not get riders very wet, various water features have been added, including guest-operated water guns, overhead showers, sprinklers, and geysers.

== Nearby ==
The ride area also includes the park's main gift and snack shop, the 'Thorpe Mega Store', which houses clothing, many different souvenirs, including shirts, hoodies, trophies, etc., and snacks, as well as 'The Doughnut Factory ', a small snack kiosk which sells refreshments.

== See also ==
- 2011 in amusement parks
