= Phantom Fantasia =

Dark ride

Thorpe Park
- Status: Closed
- Opening date: 1983 (as Phantom Fantasia); 1994 (as Wicked Witches Haunt)
- Closing date: 21 July 2000; 26 years ago
- Replaced by: Detonator

Ride statistics
- Attraction type: Dark ride
- Manufacturer: Mack Rides
- Designer: Golding Leisure Design International (1983); Rex Studios (1994)
- Theme: Haunted
- Vehicle type: Endless transit system
- Duration: 5 minutes

Phantom Fantasia, later renamed Wicked Witches Haunt, was a dark ride opened in 1983 at Thorpe Park in Surrey, England. It took riders through a series of large animated horror scenes and illusions. The ride used an endless transit system manufactured by Mack Rides in Germany. The ride was refurbished in 1994 with a new blacklight style and was renamed 'Wicked Witches Haunt'. It was demolished following a fire in 2000.

== History ==
Phantom Fantasia was opened in 1983 as part of the Central Park area, Thorpe Park's first large development into a theme park. It was produced by Golding Leisure Design. The ride system was supplied by Mack Rides and was an endless convoy system with clamshell-like cars that rotated to face each scene.

The ride featured many animated characters, including a hunchback swinging from a bone chandelier, a torture chamber run by evil puppet people, a ghoulish seance with a levitating table, a pit and the pendulum scene, Henry VIII dining at his banquet table while ghosts of his six wives appear and disappear around him (using a Pepper's ghost effect), a knights crypt, a long-legged horror climbing out a well, a Victorian street scene featuring Sweeney Todd and Mrs Lovett's shop windows (could you spot the pies with fingers sticking out them), a black magic necromancer brewing a potion with his familiars, two witches around a cauldron in their cave, Mary Queen of Scots holding her severed head in her arms, and a ballroom of eighteenth-century bewigged and costumed waltzing skeletons.

=== Wicked Witches Haunt ===
The ride was refurbished as Wicked Witches Haunt in 1994 with a scenic overhaul in UV. A number of animated witch figures were added, along with a new soundtrack and final scene featuring giant spiders. On-ride photography was also added.

The attraction was destroyed by a large fire in 2000 and subsequently demolished. The cause of the fire was never publicly announced.
