= Zodiac (ride) =

Enterprise spinning flat ride

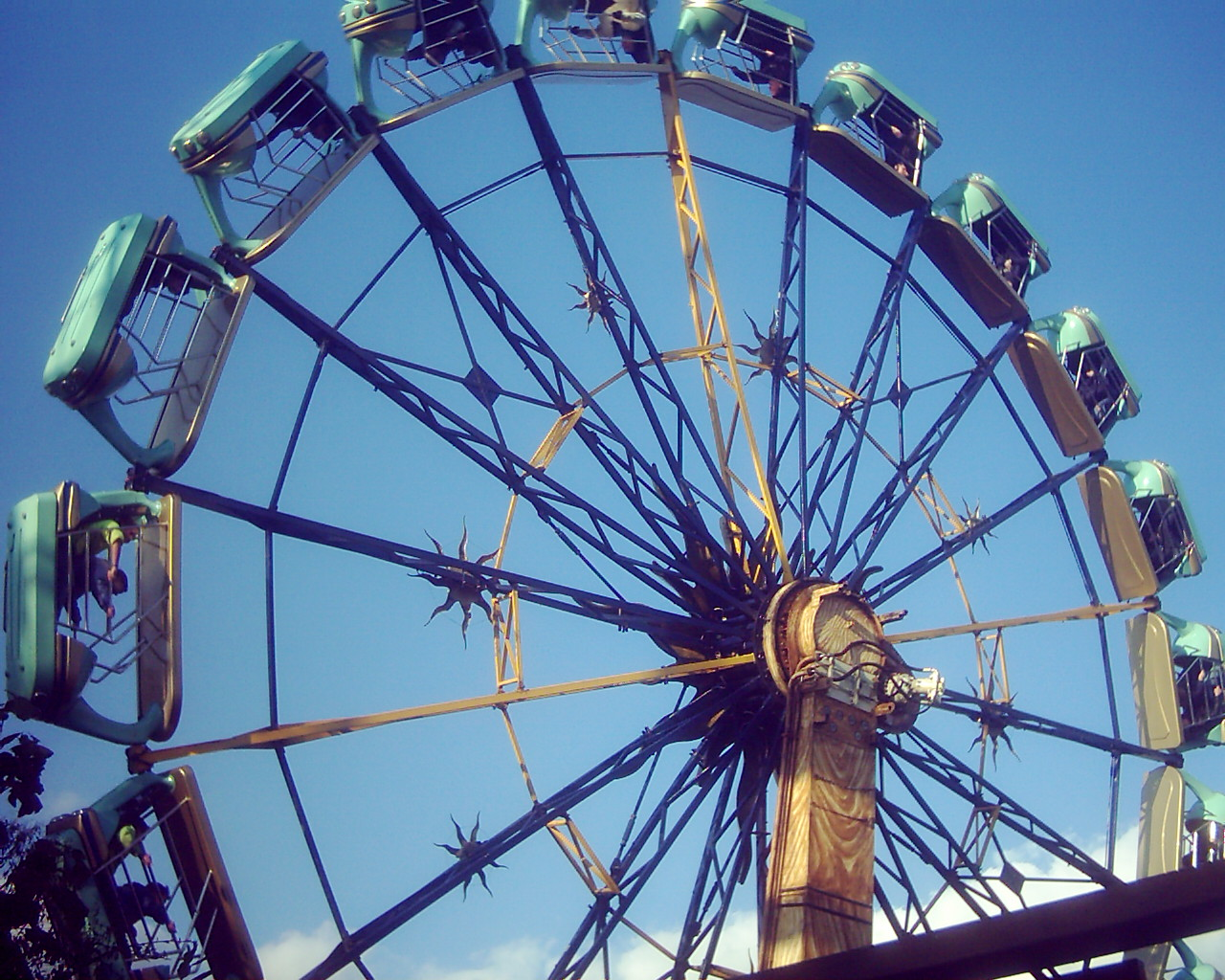
- The original Zodiac

Thorpe Park
- Area: Lost City
- Coordinates: 51°25′58.16″N 0°35′48.72″W
- Status: Closed
- Opening date: 2000 (As 'Enterprise'); 2001 (As 'Zodiac'); 2006 (Replacement)

Ride statistics
- Attraction type: Spinning Ride
- Manufacturer: HUSS Park Attractions
- Model: Enterprise
- Height: 59 ft (18 m)
- Speed: 19 mph (31 km/h)
- G-force: 3
- Vehicle type: Gondola
- Vehicles: 20
- Riders per vehicle: 2
- Duration: 60 Seconds
- Height restriction: 110 cm (3 ft 7 in)
- Wheelchair accessible
- Must transfer from wheelchair

Zodiac is a HUSS Enterprise flat ride located at Thorpe Park in Surrey, United Kingdom. The attraction features a large rotating disc with suspended gondolas that seat two riders each. As the disc spins and is gradually lifted by a hydraulic arm, riders experience a combination of rotational and tilting forces, creating near-inversions and high G-forces.

== History ==
The ride originally opened in 2000 under the name Enterprise, but was renamed Zodiac the following year to better align with the expanding Lost City theme and the opening of Vortex. This decision established the ride as a permanent installation. During the 2001 season, an incident occurred in which a gondola became partially detached from the main frame of the ride, resulting in the park being fined £65,000 in 2004. In 2006, the ride was replaced with another HUSS Enterprise, sourced from Drayton Manor. This version featured a different aesthetic from the original 2001–2004 installation, with plain white spokes and minimal red striping.

Photographs of each version of this ride

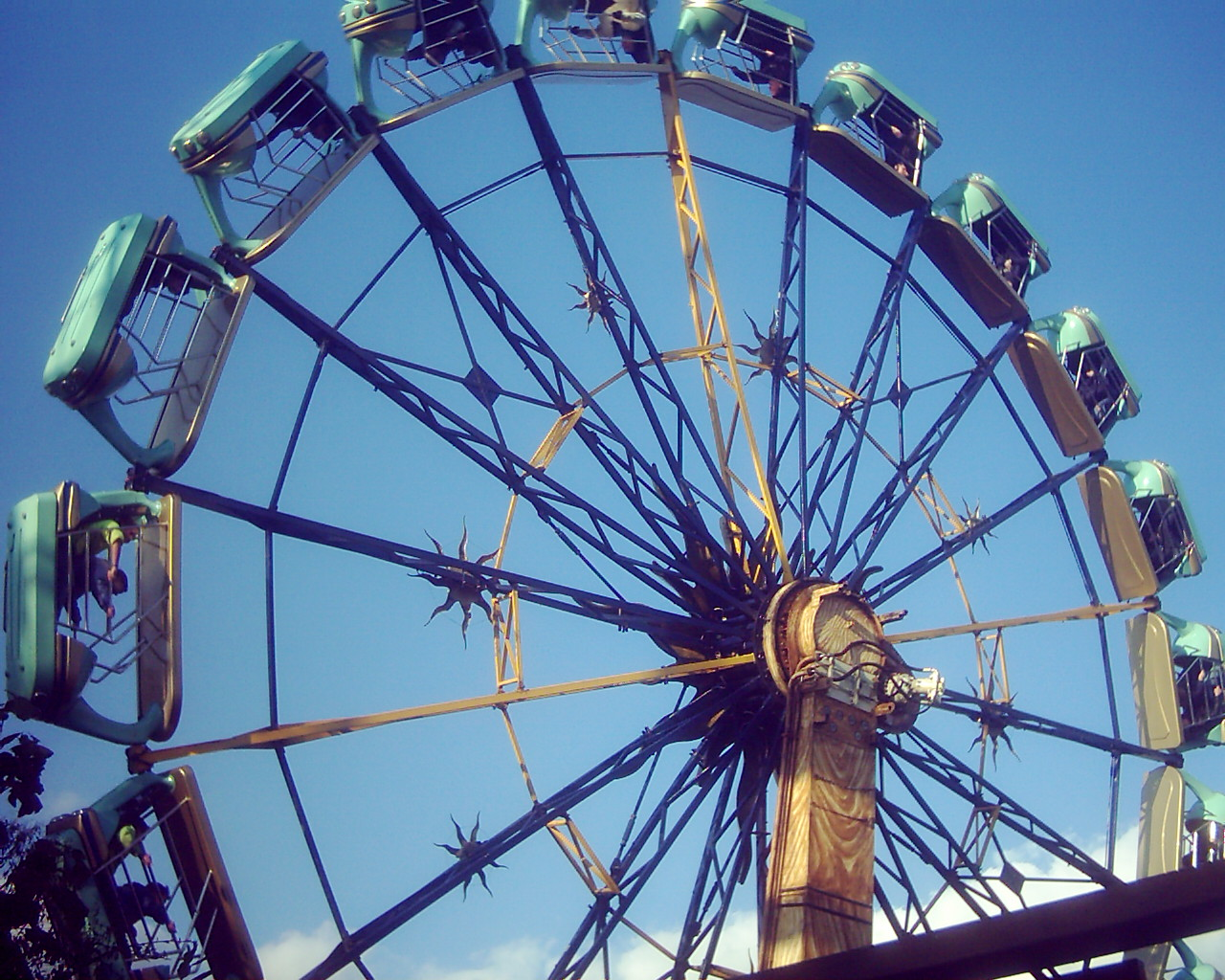
A photograph of the original version of Zodiac. Opened in 2000, and the theming (visible in this photo, which was taken in 2003) was applied for the 2001 season. This HUSS Enterprise was removed at the end of the 2005 season.

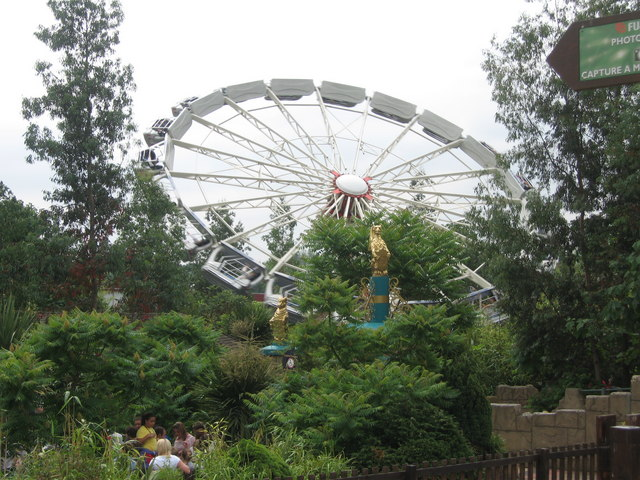
A photograph of the replacement Zodiac. This HUSS Enterprise was relocated from Drayton Manor at the end of the 2005 season, and has been operating at Thorpe Park since 2006. (This photo was taken during the 2006 season).

== Ride experience ==
Riders are seated in two-person gondolas suspended around the perimeter of a large central disc. Prior to dispatch, ride operators circulate around the disc to verify that all gondola gates are securely closed. The gondolas do not incorporate individual restraints; instead, rider containment is achieved through centrifugal forces generated during operation.

The ride cycle begins with the disc rotating at a low speed before gradually accelerating. As rotational speed increases, the gondolas swing outward, approaching a near-horizontal position, while the disc reaches a maximum rotational speed of approximately 13.5 revolutions per minute. Concurrently, a hydraulic arm elevates and tilts the disc to a maximum angle of 70 degrees. At this point, riders experience a near-inverted orientation, producing a sensation comparable to a vertical loop on a roller coaster. Following the peak tilt, the disc is lowered and rotation is reduced, allowing the gondolas to gradually return to their resting position as gravity reorients them toward the ground.

== Safety ==
In the uncommon event that Zodiac (or any other HUSS Enterprise ride) tilts beyond 90 degrees, an emergency stop procedure is triggered. During this process, the gondolas may swing uncontrollably until the ride comes to a complete stop. The ride is then gradually returned to a level position.

== See also ==
- Thorpe Park
- Enterprise (ride)
