= Ghost Train (Thorpe Park) =

Dark ride in Surrey, England

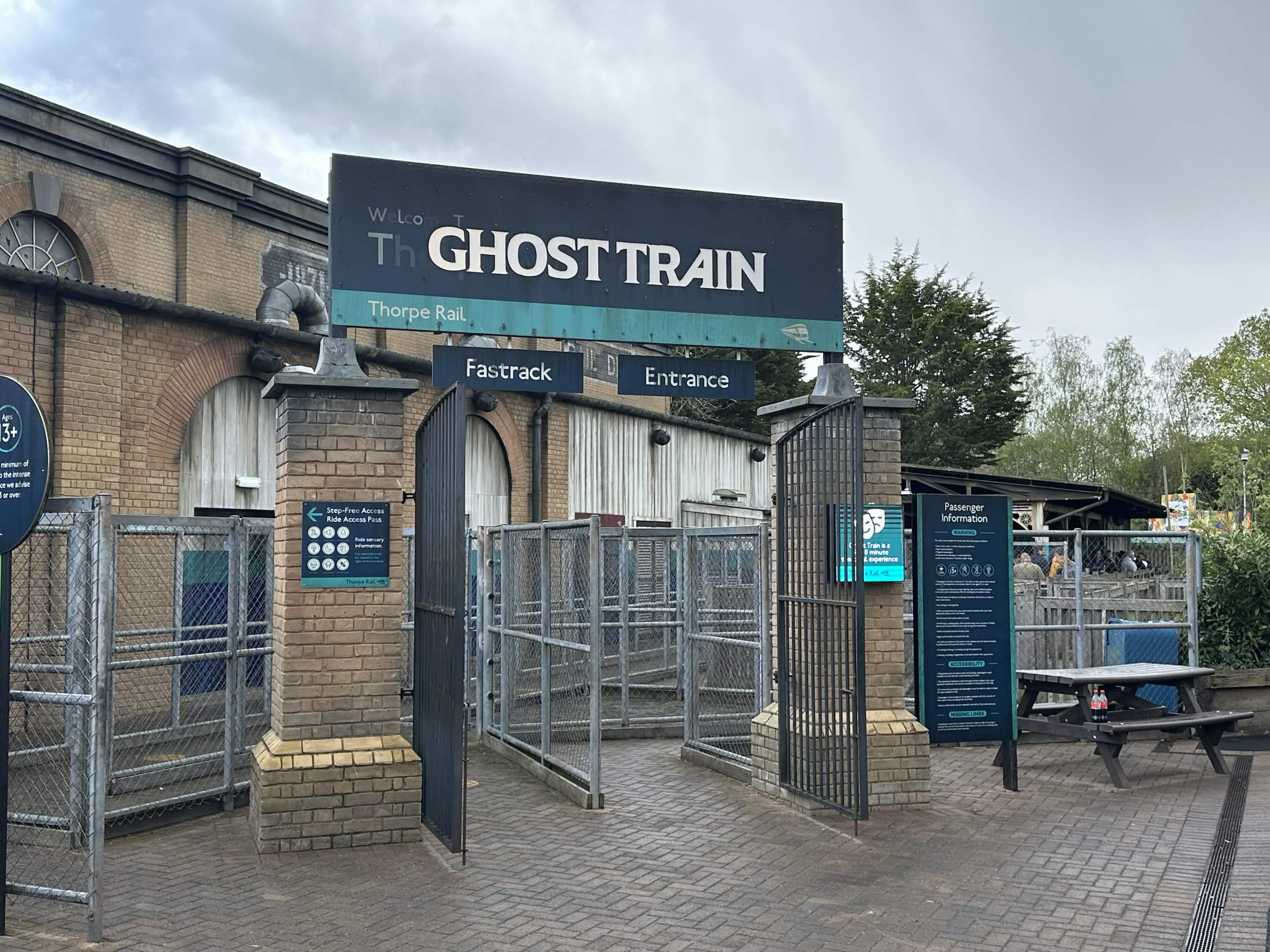
- The entrance to Ghost Train

Thorpe Park
- Area: The Dock Yard
- Status: Operating
- Opening date: 26 May 2023
- Replaced: Derren Brown's Ghost Train

Ride statistics
- Attraction type: Dark ride Live action
- Manufacturers: Simworx & Intamin
- Designer: Merlin Magic Making, MDM Create
- Theme: Train station Death; Séance; Ghost train
- Music: Archie Music Productions
- Site area: 2,306 m^{2} (24,820 sq ft)
- Capacity: 750 riders per hour
- Vehicles: 3
- Riders per vehicle: 46
- Rows: 2
- Riders per row: 23
- Participants per group: Max 46
- Duration: 15–20 minutes
- Height restriction: 130 cm (4 ft 3 in)
- Fastrack available
- Wheelchair accessible
- Must transfer from wheelchair

Ghost Train is a dark ride attraction located at Thorpe Park in Surrey, England. The ride combines motion simulation, visual illusions, multisensory special effects, and live actors to present a narrative-driven experience. It is themed around a haunted railway station set in the mid-1980s, in which guests assume the role of passengers boarding the last train service to an abandoned crypt.

The ride hardware was manufactured by Intamin, Simworx and Severn Lamb. The ride and building originally opened in July 2016 as Derren Brown's Ghost Train with a different theme. The reimagined Ghost Train opened in May 2023.

== History ==
Derren Brown's Ghost Train was first built as a simulator dark ride built by Simworx, featuring on-board virtual reality. Severn Lamb and Intamin designed and engineered the complex transit system. The project altogether was reported in the Financial Times as having a cost of £13 million. After the 2022 season, the original attraction closed to be revamped and its association with Derren Brown was discontinued.

The new attraction, renamed Ghost Train, was first announced to the public on 1 February 2023 and was described as featuring a new storyline, updated multisensory effects, the removal of virtual reality, and an experience led by live actors.

On 2 May, Thorpe Park announced via its official social media platforms, website, and mobile application that Ghost Train would open to the public on 26 May. The announcement was accompanied by newly released concept art depicting part of the interior of a deteriorated London Underground train, as well as the Grim Reaper standing outside a graveyard.

On 17 May, Thorpe Park announced a revised minimum height requirement of 1.3 metres, reduced from the previous 1.4 metres, and released additional promotional art. Ghost Train held a preview day on 25 May and officially opened to the public as scheduled on 26 May.

Upon its opening, the attraction received mixed critical and guest reception. On 11 June, Thorpe Park announced that Ghost Train would be temporarily closed from 12 to 15 June to allow for minor improvements. The attraction reopened with these changes on 16 June.

== Ride experience ==
The ride system for Ghost Train largely retains the format introduced with Derren Brown’s Ghost Train. Guests queue outside the attraction building, which is themed as a mid-1980s Thorpe Rail station, before entering a waiting room. There, an actor performing as a Thorpe Rail porter instructs guests to stand in designated areas, followed by a scripted scene and an announcement advising guests to switch off their devices. A Pepper’s ghost projection then introduces the fictional Angelus Mortis, the station master, who explains the backstory of a group of believers who travelled to Chapel Station, a railway station abandoned after a séance held there ended in their deaths. Angelus offers guests the option to leave or take the last train; the room’s windows then slam shut sequentially as a jump-scare, signalling the continuation of the experience. Guests are directed to Platform 13, where the last train awaits.

Guests board the train and are greeted by two actors playing conductors - Tripis and Thogs - before taking their seats as the train appears to depart. During the initial sequence, the conductors describe the believers’ desire for immortality and explain the closure of Chapel Station, accompanied by ominous lighting and sound effects. As the sequence intensifies, the train abruptly stops outside Chapel Station, where guests disembark.

Guests proceed into Chapel Station and through a dimly lit corridor featuring skull motifs and hanging ivy before entering St. Giles’ Chapel. Inside, Tripis and Thogs provide further information about the chapel, the members of the believers, and the phrases used during their séance. This scene escalates into a series of effects in which the conductors appear to become possessed, a ghoul passes over the guests, and statues within the chapel illuminate and rotate. Guests then exit the crypt area and return to Chapel Station as cloaked demonic figures appear to pursue them.

Guests are guided back onto the train for the next sequence, during which the conductors discuss the crypt and the intentions of the station master. This is followed by another possession sequence and an intense finale incorporating performers portraying demonic nuns, ultraviolet lighting, smoke effects, and strobe lighting.

The experience concludes with a tongue-in-cheek public address announcement instructing guests to report any suspicious activity to a member of staff, followed by the phrase “See it, say it, sorted” which mimics a slogan widely used across public transport networks in Great Britain. Guests then disembark and exit through the Last Call Café. During the attraction’s opening year, guests were briefly directed into a false gift shop for a final surprise scene featuring live actors and special effects; this sequence has been closed to guests since 2024.
