= Vortex (Thorpe Park) =

Afterburner flat ride

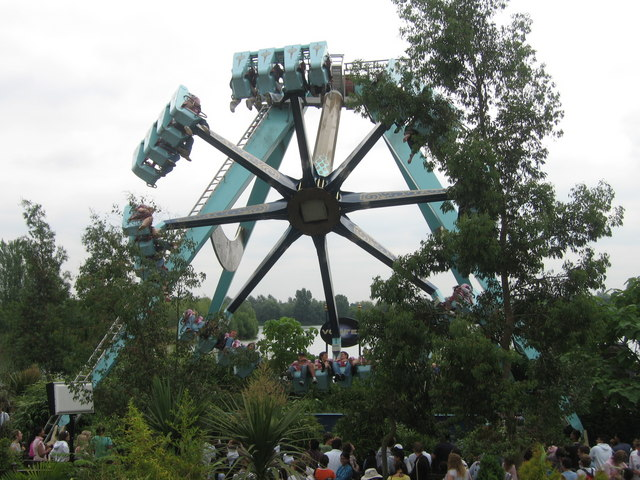

Thorpe Park
- Area: Lost City
- Status: Closed
- Opening date: 25 May 2001

Ride statistics
- Attraction type: Frisbee
- Manufacturer: KMG
- Model: Vortex
- Height: 19.812 m (65.00 ft)
- Capacity: 450 riders per hour
- Vehicles: 8
- Riders per vehicle: 4
- Height restriction: 140 cm (4 ft 7 in)
- Fastrack available
- Wheelchair accessible
- Must transfer from wheelchair

Vortex is a KMG Afterburner at Thorpe Park, an amusement park in Chertsey, Surrey, England. The ride was installed in the Lost City area of the park in 2001 and officially opened on 25 May, seven weeks into the 2001 season.

== Ride experience ==
Riders are seated in a circular arrangement, facing inward, with eight gondolas each containing four seats. Once the over-the-shoulder restraints are lowered and secured, the platform is lowered.

The seats begin to rotate, and after approximately one full rotation, the swinging motion of the ride commences. The ride swings back and forth, reaching a maximum height of 20 metres and an angle of 120 degrees, while rotating at a speed of 15 rpm.

After completing several swings at full height, the ride gradually decelerates until coming to a complete stop, at which point the platform is raised. The attraction also offers Fast Track and single rider queue options.
