= Tidal Wave (Thorpe Park) =

Shoot-the-Chutes water ride

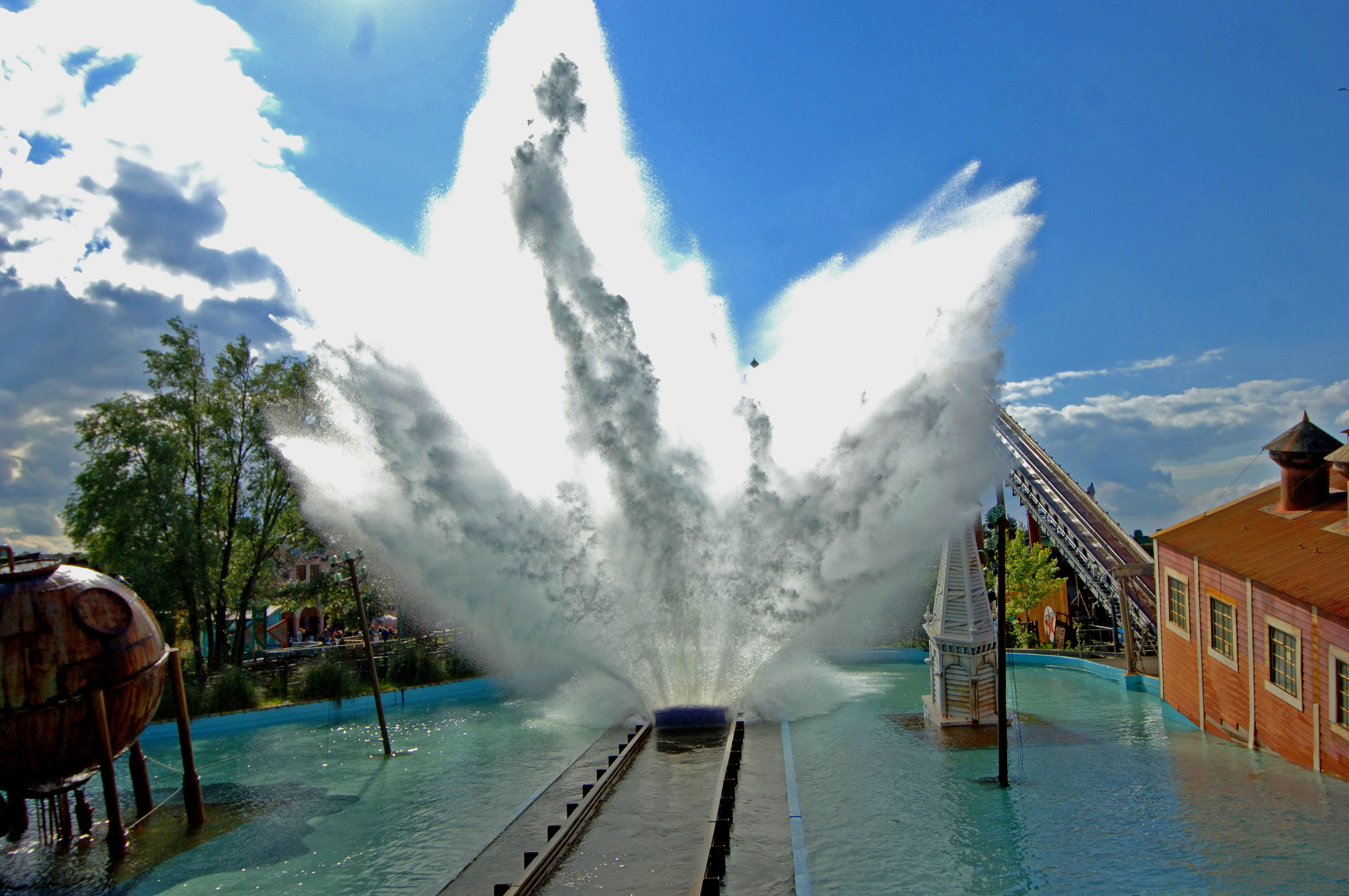
- Tidal Wave splashdown

Thorpe Park
- Area: Amity
- Coordinates: 51.404718°N 0.514391°W
- Status: Operating
- Opening date: 7 April 2000

General statistics
- Type: River rafting ride
- Manufacturer: Hopkins Rides
- Model: Shoot-the-Chutes
- Lift system: Chain lift
- Height: 85.8 ft (26.2 m)
- Drop: 85.2 ft (26.0 m)
- Speed: 45.6 mph (73.4 km/h)
- Duration: 2:30
- Boats: 3 boats. Riders are arranged 4 across in 5 rows for a total of 20 riders per boat.
- Height restriction: 120 cm (3 ft 11 in)
- Sponsor: PZ Cussons (2006–2009); Dr Pepper (2010–2018); Oasis (2018 - 2024)
- Fastrack available
- Wheelchair accessible
- Must transfer from wheelchair

Tidal Wave is a giant 'Shoot-the-Chutes' water ride located at Thorpe Park in Surrey, England, UK. It was opened in 2000. It was the Tussauds Group's first major investment in Thorpe Park after acquiring it in 1998.

When the ride was constructed in 2000 it was the tallest water ride in Europe and retained the title until 2002, when Hydro at Oakwood Theme Park was opened.

== Theme ==
The ride is set in a 1960s New England–style fishing village "Amity Cove", which appears to have been hit by a tidal wave. Throughout Amity Cove, a pastiche radio station named "WWTP Radio" plays rock and roll and surf music from the era (for example The Beach Boys and Elvis Presley), along with parody advertisements, news reports and interviews with village characters. The area originally had many scenic features, effects and visual gags on this theme, though today much has disappeared.

At its launch, marketing material described the experience as: "Total devastation: share the thrill of a fishing village which has been devastated by a huge wall of water and is about to experience a second freak hit. Riders, waiting to be evacuated from the disaster scene, will 'live through' the experience of a mega wave strike".

The ride's queueline is host to a number of partially-ruined buildings, including a bathroom with a leaking shower, an overflowing toilet and a house with a boat stuck in its roof. The station is built at an angle to give the impression that the building is sinking. Upon leaving the ride, guests are led through an open-fronted shack above the end of the track, directly in front of the splash down. As the boat hits the water, the wave travels straight towards this building and often continues on to the pathway behind.

Originally around the splash pool were several large effects, such as a giant water tower which released a torrent of water, the sound of a church organ coming from the spire of a sunken church and a gas tank that exploded with a giant flame. The gas tank no longer operates because the cylinders that were used to fuel the flame were removed during the construction of Stealth and never replaced.

=== Sponsorship ===
From 2006 to 2009, the ride was sponsored by Original Source and then by Dr. Pepper from 2010 to 2018. In 2019, Oasis was announced as the new sponsor of the ride. As of the 2025 season, the ride is no longer sponsored.
