= Meli Park =

Belgian theme park

Coordinates: 51°04′51″N 2°35′55″E

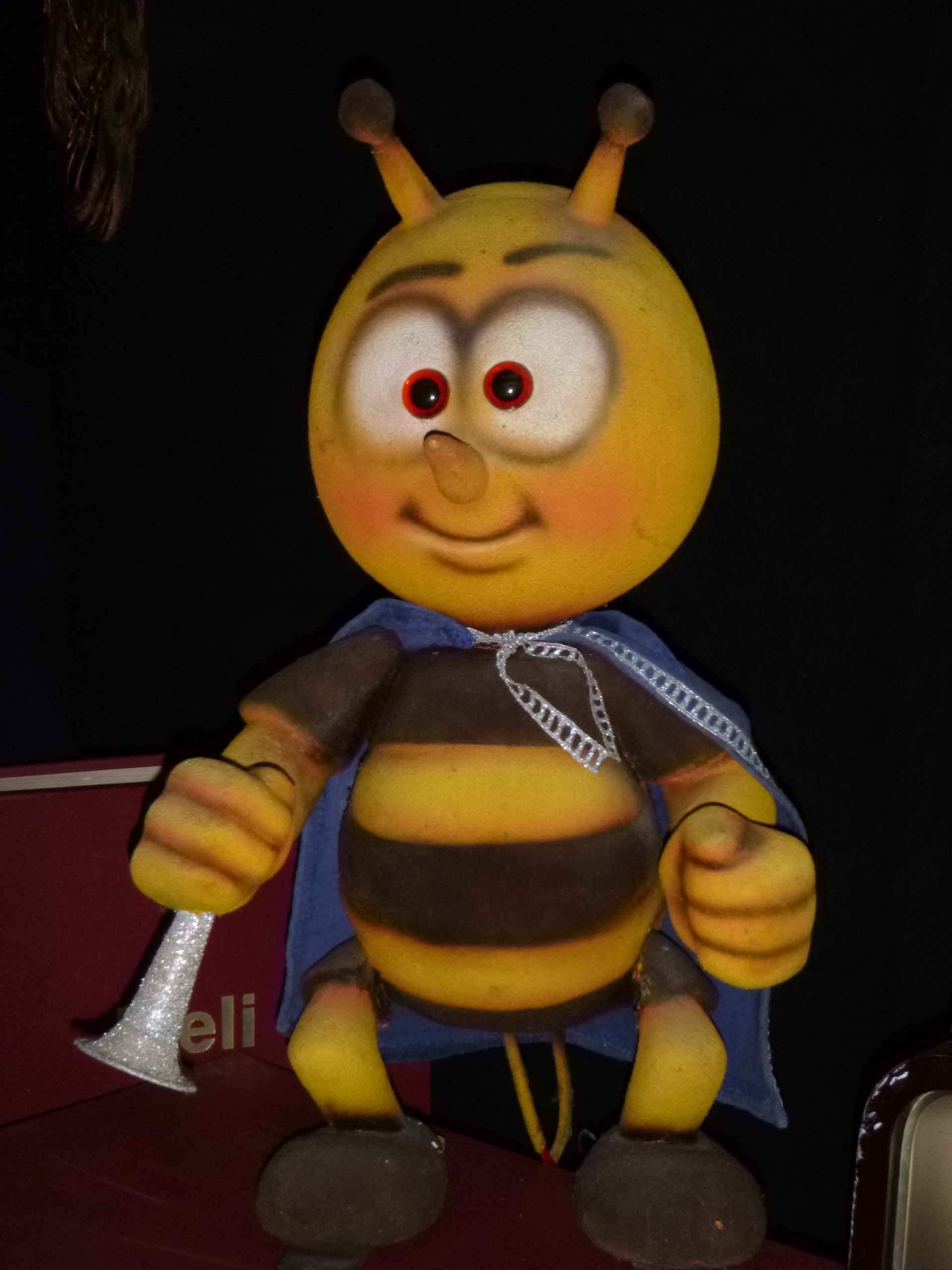
- The Meli bee, from the Apirama dark ride
- Interactive map of Meli Park
- Location: Adinkerke, West Flanders, Belgium
- Status: Defunct
- Opened: 21 April 1935
- Closed: 3 October 1999
- Owner: Family Florizoone
- Theme: Beekeeping
- Operating season: April – October
- Attendance: 630,000 in 1994
- Area: > 75 acres (> 30 ha)

Attractions
- Total: 31
- Roller coasters: 2
- Water rides: 3
- Website: Official website

Meli Park was a theme park which was opened on 21 April 1935 in Adinkerke in the municipality of De Panne on the Belgian coast. Founded by Alberic-Joseph Florizoone, owner of a honey company, the park was themed around beekeeping and its mascot was a bee. It grew to become one of the largest tourist attractions in Belgium, reaching 700,000 visitors per year at its peak in the 1970s and 1980s. Its most iconic attraction was the Apirama dark ride, opened in 1979. The park closed on 3 October 1999 and was subsequently sold to Studio 100, a Flemish children's television company, which rethemed the site as Plopsaland.

== History ==
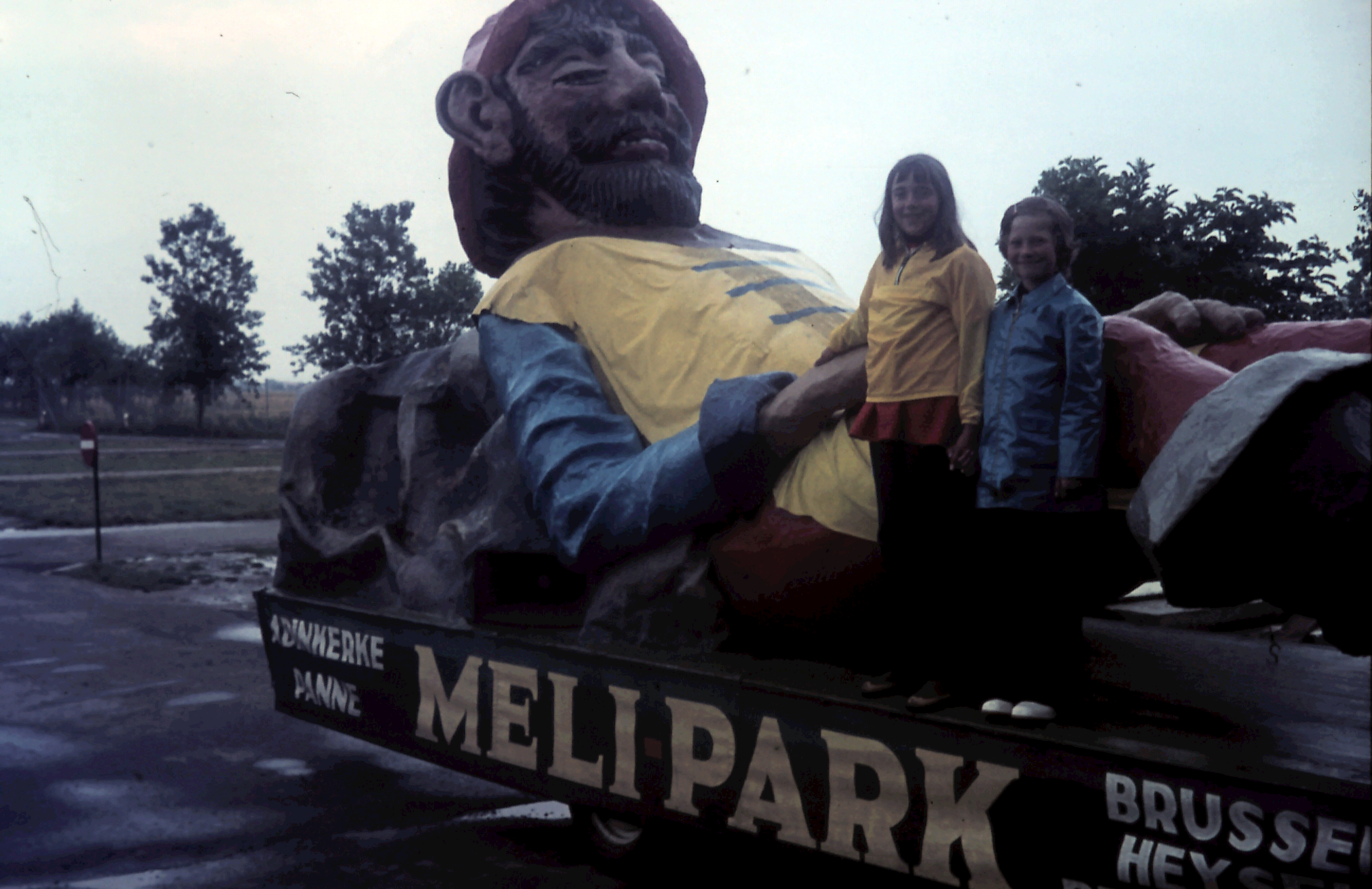

The bee-themed amusement park was initiated by Alberic-Joseph Florizoone, owner of a honey company. Its mascot was a bee. It was one of the first Belgian theme parks. Over the years some new attractions were added. The first ones were the labyrinth and the zoo. In the 1950s, a miniature golf course, french formal gardens, a fairytale forest, water organ were introduced. Over the years, it became one of the biggest attractions in Belgium as Antwerp Zoo and Caves of Han-sur-Lesse.

Into the 1970s and the 1980s, with a growing variety of rides, Meli Park's visitor numbers reached 700,000 per annum. Its iconic attraction was the Apirama dark ride, opened in 1979, featuring hundreds of animated bees.

The park closed in 1999. It was sold to the Flemish children's television company Studio 100 and rethemed as Plopsaland. In 1999 Alberic-Joseph Florizoone was inducted into the IAAPA Hall of Fame, an honor reserved for amusement industry innovators and pioneers.

== Attractions ==
=== Roller coasters ===
Ride	Year opened	Year closed	Description	Picture
Jubilé	1995	2000	The Zyklon (roller coaster) was relocated to Selva Mágica, Mexico, in 2000	
Jumbo 5	1984	late 80s	It is the only Schwarzkopf Jumbo V in the world, as it was the only one manufactured. In 1995 it was relocated to Pleasurewood Hills under the name Cannonball Express. Previously named Enigma from 2005 to 2016 when it was renamed Cannonball Express.	
Marienkaferbahn	1976	1999	It reopened in Plopsaland as Dongo's Race. From 2013 until 2021, the ride's name was changed to Viktor's Race. Since 2022, the ride is called #LikeMe Coaster.	
Rollerskater	1990	1999	The first Vekoma Junior Coaster. It reopened in Plopsaland as Rollerskater. Since 2019, the ride is called K3 Roller Skater, and is themed to Belgian girl group K3.	
Racing	1988 or earlier	early 90s	A Flitzer model, similar to Flitzer at Morey's Piers.	

=== Thrill rides ===
Ride	Year opened	Year closed	Description	Picture
Calypso	1988 or earlier	1992	A Mack Rides spinning ride, similar to Tiki Twirl at Cedar Point. It spins riders in two degrees of motion.	
Piratenboot	1981	1999	HUSS Park Attractions Pirate ship. It reopened in Plopsaland as Piratenboot.	
Splash	1989	1999	Manufactured by Mack Rides, the ride was inaugurated in 1989 by the Prime Minister of Belgium of the time, Wilfried Martens. Highest and fastest log flume of Europe of the time. It reopened in Plopsaland as Het Kasteel van Koning Samson. In 2007 the ride's name changed for Boomstammetjes. In 2019, the ride was rethemed and is now called DinoSplash.	
Vliegend Tapijt Djinn	1984	1999	Weber 1001 Nachts ride.	
Wienerwals	late 80s	1999	Zierer Chair-O-Planes ride. It reopened in Plopsaland as Wienerwalz. In 2015, the original ride was replaced by a new construction with a different design.	
