= Loudoun Castle (theme park) =

Former British amusement park

- Loudoun Park's logo
- Interactive map of Loudoun Castle
- Location: Galston, Scotland
- Coordinates: 55.61061°N 4.37279°W
- Opened: 1995
- Closed: 2010
- Slogan: Scotland's Best Family Theme Park

Attractions
- Total: 22 altogether
- Roller coasters: 3
- Water rides: 1

Loudoun Castle was a theme park set around the ruins of the 19th century Loudoun Castle near Galston, in the Loudoun area of Ayrshire, Scotland. The park opened in 1995, and closed at the end of the 2010 season. The park's mascot was Rory the Lion.

== History ==
The 594-acre estate was purchased by London-based company, Lands Improvement Holdings plc in 1993, who built and developed the theme park which opened in 1995. In 1998, the park was sold to travelling showman Raymond Codona and then again to Henk Bembom's Parkware Ltd in 2003. Bembom invested £5 million during his first year there, followed by an additional £2 million in the second. Bembom continued to bring new rides and attractions to the park each year, including another £2 million of investment in 2007. In winter 2006, Parkware moved all their operations and ride stock to Loudoun from their previous storage buildings in Margate.

On 15 July 2007, 18-year-old ride operator Mark Blackwood (January 23, 1989 – July 16, 2007) fell 80 feet (24 m) from a roller coaster he was pushing, The Rat, which had got stuck. He was taken to Crosshouse Hospital in Kilmarnock for treatment but died there on 16 July 2007. After a two-week trial, the jury found the park owners not guilty of failing to provide proper training and supervision at Kilmarnock Sheriff Court on Saturday 10 October 2009.

In September 2010 it was announced that the park had closed, Henk Bembom of Parkware Ltd. stating that it was "no longer economically viable." There were no clear indications as to the future use of the site, whether the current owners intend to sell the business on as a 'going concern' or if they intended to use the site for other purposes.

After the park's closure, its rides were listed for sale, including Twist 'n' Shout, Gold Rush, Barnstormer, Wacky Worm, Crow's Nest and Jammy Dodgems. Some of the rides were sold to other theme parks in the United Kingdom and around the world.

As a Category A listed building, the possibilities for any redevelopment of the ruins of Loudoun Castle proper, as opposed to this adjacent theme park, are severely limited by law.

== Attractions ==
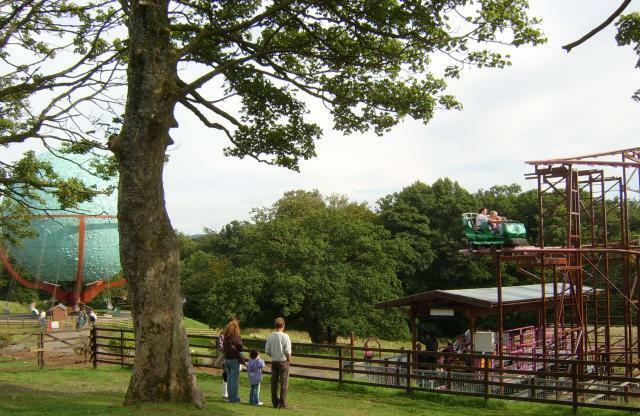
The Plough and The Rat rides at Loudoun Castle

Many of the rides at Loudoun Castle had been operated at Dreamland Margate in Kent when it was owned by Bembom Brothers. A few of these rides can be seen in the Only Fools and Horses 1989 Christmas Special "The Jolly Boys' Outing", in which the Trotters and many other male cast members visit Dreamland Margate.

=== Final roller coasters ===
These roller coasters were located at Loudoun Castle in 2010 during its final season.

Roller coaster name	Opened	Closed	Manufacturer	Model/Type	Location	Notes
Gold Rush	2010	2010	Zierer	Four Man Bob	Dougal McDougal's Farm	An portable Four Man Bob style roller coaster built by Zierer that was originally manufactured in 1975 and travelled Germany with showman Ludewigt before operating briefly at Traumland Park in 1983. It was then brought by John Broome and operated at Trentham Gardens and Alton Towers before transferring to Pleasure Island Family Theme Park and Flamingo Land. After it left Flamingo Land after the 2001 season, the coaster was bought by Bembom Rides and was completely overhauled before being leased to Grove Land in Wales. It was then moved along the rest of Parkware Ltd's ride stock to Loudoun Castle in 2007, going into storage before opening in 2010 to replace The Rat. After the park closed, it was left standing but not operating for many years until it was dismantled and removed from the site in 2017. It now operates at Family Park in France under the same name since 2020.
Twist 'n' Shout	2003	2010	Schwarzkopf	Silverarrow	—N/a	Portable looping Schwarzkopf roller coaster that was owned by Parkware Ltd. previously Bembom Rides that originally opened in 1980 at OK Corral in France. It then operated at many UK theme parks including Ocean Beach Fun Fair, Camelot Theme Park and Dreamland Margate before being moved to Loudoun Castle in 2003. Operated until the park closed in 2010. After closure, it was offered for sale until it was dismantled and relocated in 2017 to Fun Park Mirnovec (now Dalmaland) in Croatia, where it reopened as Big Blue that same year.
Wacky Worm	2003	2010	I.E Park	Wacky Worm	Pirate Cove	Opened in 2003 and replaced an identical model that was previously located on its plot. Has since been removed from the park with its fate unknown.

=== Final rides ===
These rides were located at Loudoun Castle during its final season in 2010.

Ride name	Opened	Closed	Manufacturer	Model/Type	Location	Notes
Barnstormer	23 May 2007	2010	S&S Worldwide	Drop tower	Dougal McDougal's Farm	An 140-foot-tall (43 m) shot-and-drop tower. Relocated and purchased from the defunct Pleasureland Southport in Southport after it closed in 2006, where it was originally known as Lucozade Space Shot which opened in 2002. The ride was completely overhauled with many components replaced, with it officially opened on 23 May 2007 by The MacDonald Brothers. After the park's closure, it was listed for sale with the rest of the attractions until it was dismantled and removed from the site by 2015. It later reopened in 2018 at Trans Studio Bandung in Bandung, Indonesia, where it is now known as Pemburu Badai.
Black Pearl	2004	2010	Weber	Ranger	Pirate Cove	An Traum Boot attraction built by Weber of Germany. It originally operated at Dreamland Margate in 1983 as Mary Rose. It then operated at the park from 1996 to 1998 under loan from Bembom Rides as Wallace Sword before being rented out to the now defunct Pluton Park in Virgo, Spain from 2000 to 2002. It ultimately reopened at Loudoun Castle in 2004 as Black Pearl, being rethemed to fit the Pirate Cove area. After the park closed in 2010, it was sold along with many other rides to Lightwater Valley in North Yorkshire where it reopened in 2011, retaining its existing name and theme. It was later removed after the 2020 season due to the park shifting its demographic.
Bugs Life	—N/a	2010	Modern Products	Roundabout	Pirate Cove	Roundabout ride for children themed after the 1998 Pixar animated film A Bug's Life. Left standing but not operating after the park's closure. Fate currently unknown.
Carousel	2003	2010	Zierer	Hoppla Hopp	Pirate Cove	An carousel manufactured by Zierer and known as a Hoppla Hopp model. It originally operated at OK Corral during the 1980s before being loaned to Pleasurewood Hills in Lowestoft, Suffolk from 1985 to 1997. It then operated on loan at Pluton Park in Spain before opening at Loudoun Castle. It is currently listed for sale after the park closed.
Crow's Nest	2004	2010	HUSS	Troika	Pirate Cove	An spinning thrill ride that features three giant arms which rotate up, spin and lift. It was originally located at Ocean Park where it operated from 1984 to 2000. After Loudoun Castle closed, it was standing but not operating until it was sold to Cedar Fair in 2015 as part of a batch of pre-owned rides. It later reopened in 2017 at Carowinds in Charlotte, North Carolina, United States as Do-Si-Do after a refurbishment.
Drunken Barrels	2006	2010	W.G.H. Transportation Engineering	Boat ride	Pirate Cove	Originally operated indoors at Dreamland Margate from 1996 to 2004 as Stowaway. Fate is currently unknown.
Freefall	2003	2010	Zamperla	Junior drop tower	Pirate Cove	Relocated to Pleasurewood Hills in 2012.
French Taxis	2002	2010	I.E. Park	Dodgems	—N/a	Adult dodgems.
HMS Flora MacDougal	2003	2010	HUSS	Pirate ship	Dougal McDougal's Farm	An classic HUSS pirate ship attraction originally built in 1978 for German showman Franz Brusch and then operated at Lion Safari Park Tüddern from 1979 to 1982. It was then sold to UK showman Jimmy Godden in 1983 and operated at both Pleasurerama Amusement Park and Rotunda Amusement Park over the years before moving to Dreamland Margate in 1995. After the 2002 season, it was sold to Loudoun Castle and reopened in 2003. After closure, it was sold to Lightwater Valley with many other attractions where it was refurbished and reopened in 2011 as Flying Cutlass.
Jammy Dodgems	—N/a	2010	—N/a	Junior dodgems	Dougal McDougal's Farm	Junior dodgems.
Junior Pirate Ship	—N/a	2010	Modern Products	Junior pirate ship	Pirate Cove	Smaller version of HMS Flora MacDougal built for children. Opened at an unknown date and was relocated to Lightwater Valley after the park's closure.
Junior Twist	—N/a	2010	S&W Amusement Sales	Junior scrambler	Pirate Cove	Junior scrambler for children. After closure, now operates at Bouncy Land in Lincolnshire.
Loggers Leap	1995	2010	Reverchon	Log flume	Dougal McDougal's Farm	Loudoun Castle's classic log flume. It was originally known under the names of Splash Mountain Log Flume and Loudoun Log Flume before 2003. After the park's closure, it was dismantled with its fate currently unknown.
MacDougal's Tractor Ride	2003	2010	Metallbau Emmeln	Track ride	Dougal McDougal's Farm	An track ride, where guests could ride tractors. Sold and relocated to Lightwater Valley in late 2010 where it reopened in 2013 as Eagles Creek Farm.
Milk Churn	2003	2010	De Boer	Round Up	Dougal McDougal's Farm	An round up ride, which first operated at OK Corral in France during the early 1980s before being leased to Pleasurewood Hills from 1985 to 1987. It then operated at Attractiepark Slagharen in the Netherlands from 1988 to around 1992 or later before going into storage. It later resurfaced at Loudoun Castle where it reopened in 2003 as Milk Churn after a farm theme. It was sold after closure to UK showman Henry Danter and was relocated to Treasure Island Amusement Park in Stourport-on-Severn where it reopened in 2011 as Crazy Cage.
Mini Chair-o-planes	2008	2010	Park Rides Lamborghini	Mini Chair-O-Plane	Pirate Cove	Relocated to Lightwater Valley in 2011.
Old Timers	2005	2010	Metallbau Emmeln	Track ride	—N/a	Ride hardware sold to Lightwater Valley after closure and reopened in 2015 as Vintage Car Rally.
Plough	2005	2010	Schwarzkopf	Chair-O-Plane	Dougal McDougal's Farm	One of only two Apollo 14 rides built by Anton Schwarzkopf. Both were originally built as roundabout rides with individual spinning rider pods around a giant moon structure. This unit was built in 1970 for German showman Beuermann where it travelled until around 1972. It was then sold and placed at Kölner Tivoli in Germany at an unknown time where it remained until the park closed around 1975 after which it was purchased by Ponypark in the Netherlands. It operated there from 1976 until 1984 when it was moved in 1985 to Bembom Brothers Theme Park in England. It was later converted to a chair-o-plane attraction during 1990 and operated until 1995. It was later leased to Lightwater Valley in North Yorkshire where it ran as The Orbiter from 1998 until after the 2004 season. It was then placed at Loudoun Castle where it was rethemed as the Plough in 2005 to fit the Dougal McDougal's Farm area. After the park's closure in 2010, it was left standing but not operating for many years until finally being dismantled and put up for sale. During 2025, it was eventually sold to Movieland Park in Italy, where it reopened in March 2026 as Driller after a extensive refurbishment which saw the removal of the Apollo 14 planet structure.
Pony Trek	2003	2010	Metallbau Emmeln	Track ride	Dougal McDougal's Farm	Relocated to Pleasurewood Hills in 2012.
Regetta	2006	2010	Zamperla	Sea storm	Pirate Cove	Originally ran at Dreamland Margate as Regetta from 2001 until 2004. Later sold to Lightwater Valley along with many other attractions where it reopened in 2011 as Skull Rock.
Rodeo Rider	2004	2010	Emmo Kreekel	Calypso	Dougal McDougal's Farm	Originated from the Netherlands. Ran briefly at Bembom Brothers Theme Park in England before being rented out to Pleasurewood Hills from 1985 to 1994. It then ran at Loudoun Castle from 1997 to 1998 under loan via different ownership before being returned into storage. It was then leased to Grove Land in Wales from 2001 until 2003 before being sent back to Loudoun Castle again. It is now operating at Adventure Coast Southport since 2013 after a complete overhaul.
Sea Patrol	2008	2010	Technical Park	Red baron	Pirate Cove	Small plane ride for young children. Opened in 2008 and fate is currently unknown since the park closed.
Stormbreaker	2008	2010	HUSS	Breakdance	Pirate Cove	HUSS Breakdance 4 ASR model. It was originally built in 1998 and was located at Six Flags New England in Agawam, Massachusetts, United States, where it was known as Rodeo until it was removed after the 2007 season. The ride was purchased by Parkware Ltd. in early 2008 and was refurbished by HUSS before opening at Loudoun Castle in 2008. It replaced Captain's Wheel in Pirate Cove and was called Stormbreaker. It was relocated to Lightwater Valley after closure in 2011, where it continues to operate as Powder Kegs.

=== Former roller coasters ===
Roller coaster name	Opened	Closed	Manufacturer	Model/Type	Location	Notes
Dragon	1995	1999	Zamperla	Powered roller coaster	—N/a	Operated previously at Flambards Experience in Helston, Cornwall from 1990 to 1994. Later sold to UK showman Charlie Hart.
Galaxy	2000	2002	S.D.C	Galaxi	—N/a	Brought to the park by Scottish showman Raymond Codona who owned the park at the time. It was built on the former location of Thunder Loop Express and was later replaced by Twist 'n' Shout in 2003 after Bembom Rides purchased Loudoun Castle.
Slitherin'	2002	2004	Schwarzkopf	City Jet	Dougal McDougal's Farm	Originally built for German showman Walter Hartmann in 1974 and travelled until 1979 before being sold to Gardaland in Italy where it ran as Zyklon (or Zyklen) from around 1980 to 1984. It then operated at another unknown location in Italy from 1985 to 1990 before being sold to Billing Aquadrome in Northhamptonshire, England where it operated from 1991 to 1995. It was then sold to Bembom Rides who in turn leased it to Lightwater Valley where it reopened in 1996 before being renamed to Viper the following year. It was removed after the 2001 season and was placed at Loudoun Castle the following year. In 2004, it was renamed and rethemed as Slitherin' before closing at the end of the season to make room for The Rat. It was then dismantled and was placed into storage being offered for sale for a few years before it was eventually sold to Movieland Park in Italy where it operated from 2010 until 2019 as Brontojet before being removed.
The Rat	2005	2009	Maurer AG	Wild mouse	Dougal McDougal's Farm	Was originally located at Dreamland Margate where it operated from 1998 to 2004 as Wild Mouse. It was purchased by Loudoun Castle in early 2005 along with Regetta and was rebuilt to open in 2005 as The Rat on the former plot of Slitherin'. It was removed after the 2009 season to make room for Gold Rush and was sold to Holiday Park in Germany where it operated from 2010 until 2016 as Holly's Wilde Autofahrt. It was later sold again to Eifelpark where it reopened as Käpt'n Jack's Wilde Maus in 2017.
Thunder Loop Express	1997	1998	Schwarzkopf	Looping Star	—N/a	First located at Dreamland Margate where it operated from 1982 to 1995 under the name of Looping Star. It was leased to the park from Bembom Rides and was later loaned to Vidámpark in Budapest, Hungary from 2001 to 2009. It now operates at Lion Park Resort in Botswana as Gwazi since 2011.
Wacky Worm	1999	2002	—N/a	Wacky Worm	—N/a	Replaced by an newer model in 2003. Now owned by Irish showman Paul Curry.
Wild Maus	2000	2001	Heinrich	Wooden wild mouse	—N/a	Built by German showman Heinrich in 1964 and travelled until 1984. It was located in Switzerland and Germany afterward before operating at Spreepark from 1995 to 1997 before it was purchased by Raymond Codona and placed at Loudoun Castle where it operated from 2000 to 2001 before replaced by Viper.

=== Former rides ===
Ride name	Opened	Closed	Manufacturer	Model/Type	Location	Notes
Captain's Wheel	2003	2007	HUSS	Enterprise	—N/a	First located at OK Corral in France where it operated from 1980 until 1985. It was then rented from Bembom Rides to many locations such as Ocean Beach Fun Fair from 1986 to 1988, Pleasurewood Hills from 1989 to 1998 and Pluton Park in Virgo, Spain during 2000 before operating at Grove Land in Wales from 2001 to 2003 as Sky Rider. It would open at Loudoun Castle in 2003 as Captain Wheel, being rethemed to suit the Pirate Cove area. It closed after the 2007 season to make room for Stormbreaker and was put into storage. Eventually after the park's closure it was sold to the Looping Group in late 2011 and after a major refurbishment now operates at Avonturenpark Hellendoorn in the Netherlands as Tarantula Magica since 2012.
