= Pleasurewood Hills =

Theme park in Suffolk, England

Pleasurewood Hills Family Theme Park
- Previously known as New Pleasurewood Hills and Pleasurewood Hills American Theme Park
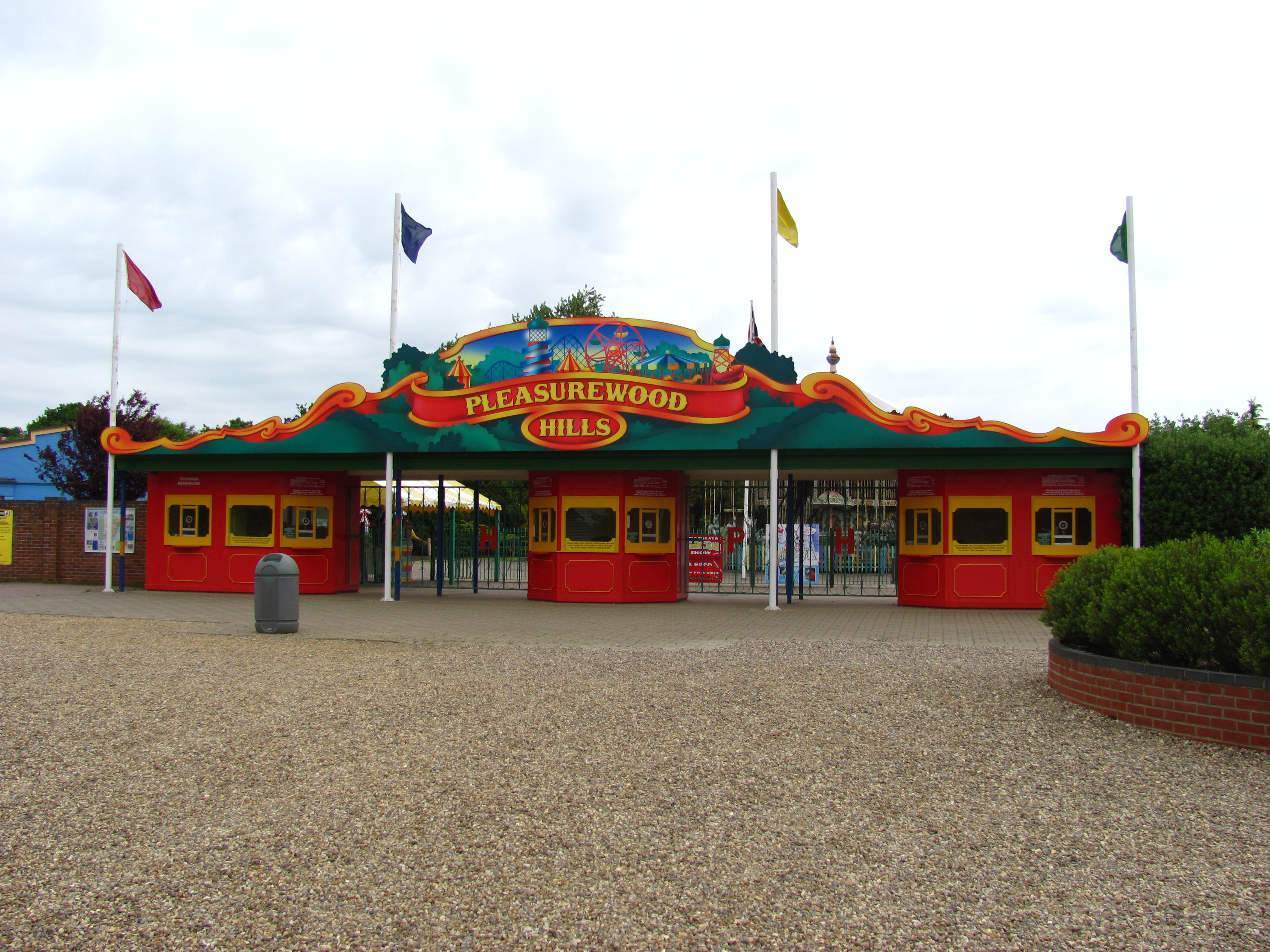
- Entrance to the park in late 2000s
- Interactive map of Pleasurewood Hills Family Theme Park
- Location: Lowestoft, Suffolk
- Coordinates: 52.50707°N 1.74443°E
- Status: Operating
- Opened: 1983
- Owner: Premier Attractions
- Area: 24 ha (59 acres)

Attractions
- Total: 30
- Roller coasters: 6
- Water rides: 2
- Website: pleasurewoodhills.com

Pleasurewood Hills is a theme park on a 59-acre (24 ha) site between Corton and Gunton, near Lowestoft, Suffolk.

== History ==
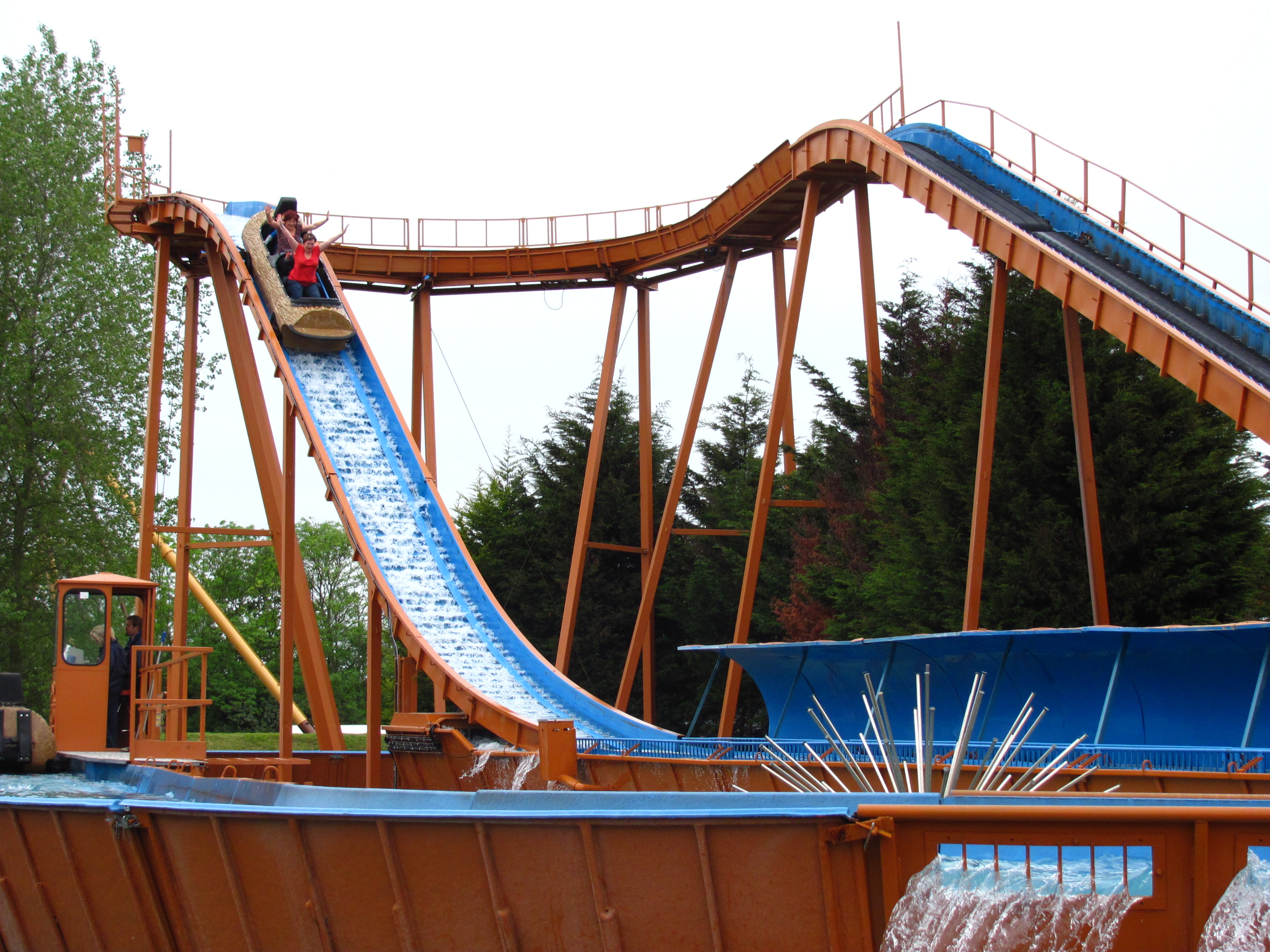
Water ride

The park was created by entrepreneur Joe Larter in 1983 as a small American-themed family attraction, containing a miniature railway, Cine 180 and adventure playground. Yearly expansion brought the addition of new attractions and general improvements. Controlling interest in the park was sold to RKF, a property development company, in the late 1980s. RKF built attractions including two Sea Life centres (Great Yarmouth & Hunstanton), a Ripley's Believe It or Not (Great Yarmouth seafront) and the 9-mile (14 km) Bure Valley Railway (in Aylsham). It started building a second Pleasurewood Hills style park in Cleethorpes. RKF went bankrupt in early 1991 and its attractions were sold. Some Pleasurewood management staff took control of The Bygone Village at Fleggburgh.

Noel Edmonds converted the Haunted Theatre into Crinkley Bottom Castle in the mid-1990s. The park also featured appearances by Mr Blobby and Edmonds himself.

The park continued in this vein until 1996–1997, when it was bought by Leisure Great Britain, a caravan park operator. It owned the park until 2000, when Peter and Peggy Hadden, who had been connected with the park for many years, bought it. The name changed to New Pleasurewood Hills. In 2000 the park bought Magic Mouse.

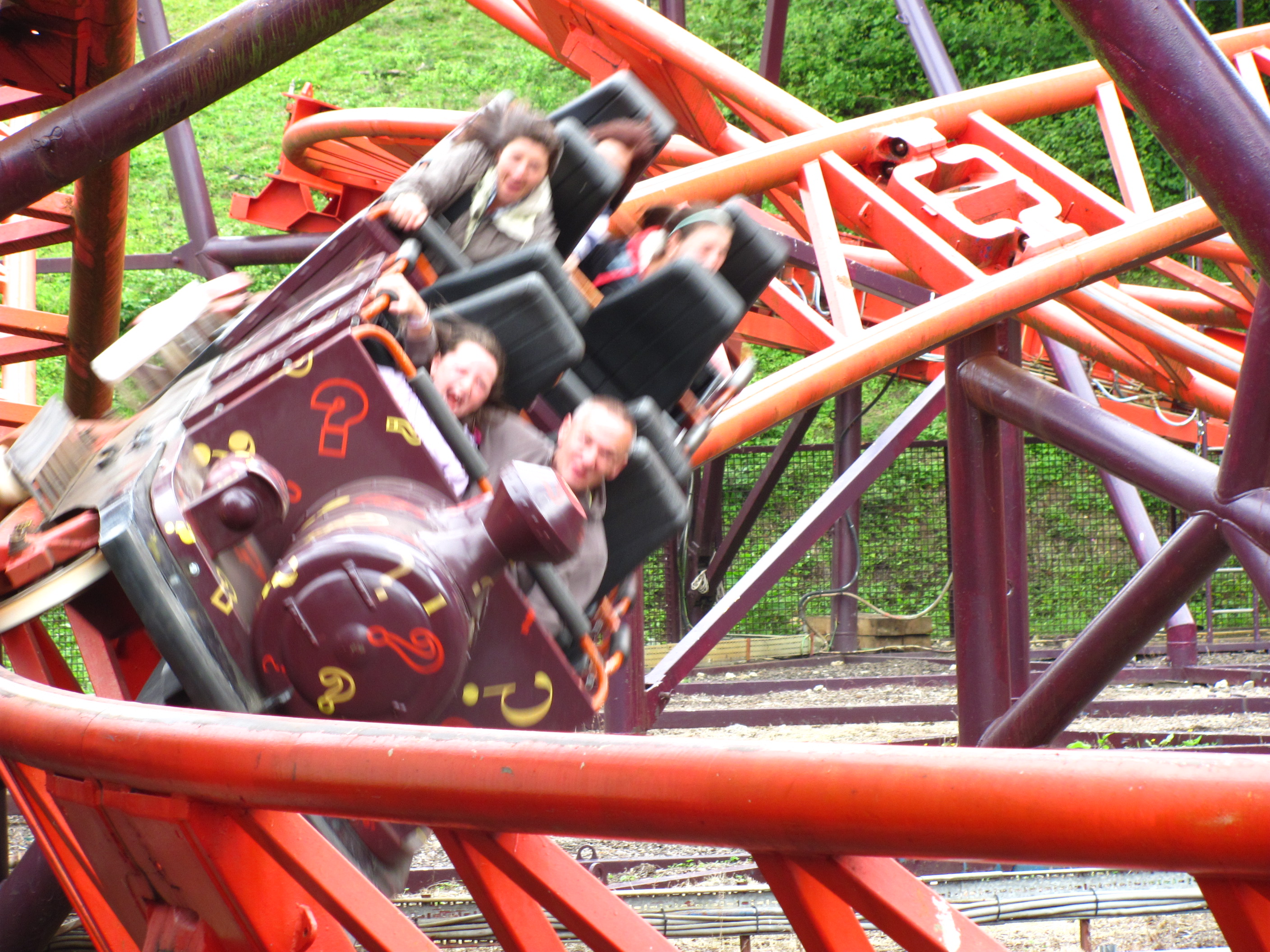
Cannonball Express roller coaster

In 2004, Grévin & Cie, a French leisure group, purchased the site. The name reverted to its original form and in early 2005 the owners said they would spend £3 million on improvements.

Changes included repainting and renaming a number of rides, but the first major investment was in the park's first inverting coaster, Wipeout, from the closed American Adventure. The old cars were scrapped and new ones bought from Walibi World.

In 2009 the Mellow Yellow log flume was repainted and had a revamped entrance. It is now called Timber Falls. In 2010 the park put a StreetDance show in the Castle Theatre. In 2010 the park appointed a new manager after Yves Delhommeau (2004-2009).

On 30 January 2011, it was announced that the park had been sold to Looping Group. In 2025, the park was sold to Premier Attractions.

== Rides and Attractions ==
=== Roller coasters ===
| Ride | Opened | Manufacturer | Model | Description |
|---|---|---|---|---|
| Barnyard Whirl | 2026 | Levent Lunapark | Twister Coaster | 12m tall spinning wild mouse coaster located on the previous site of the Fireball ride and Summer Circus. The family-thrill coaster has been introduced as part of 4 new rides for the 2026 season by new owners Premier Attractions. Previously known as "Crash Test". Installed with "5 year temporary consent". |
| Cannonball Express | 1995 | Schwarzkopf | Jumbo V | Previously known as 'Enigma' & 'Cannonball Express', this is the only example of a Jumbo V model by the defunct manufacturer Schwarzkopf. Height limit 1.25m. Previously operated at the Rotunda Amusement Park in Folkestone as "Super Figure Eight". In 2017, the park returned the original name of 'Cannonball Express' due to popular demand. The coaster will be left closed during the 2026 season. |
| Egg-Spress | 1986 | Zierer | Tivoli Large | Opened as "Ladybird". Later re-themed to "Rattlesnake" in 1990, and then "Snake in the Grass" in 2007. Was renamed back to "Rattlesnake" in 2014. Closed down in 2016, due to track problems. Following repair, the ride re-opened in 2019 with the new name "Egg-Spress" in a new Farmyard themed area. |
| Marble Madness | 2014 | Maurer Söhne | Wild Mouse | A non-spinning wild mouse coaster that formerly operated at Flamingo Land from 1997 to 2012, being later sold to Pleasurewood Hills. Wild mouse (car 2+2) that reaches a speed of 28 mph (45 km) on a 1213 ft long track (370 m) and a height of 49 ft (15 m). Height limit 1.25m. |
| Red Apple Run | 2026 | Güven Lunapark | Apple Coaster | 5m tall 'big apple' children's coaster located on the previous site of the Flying Elephants and Mini Pirate Ship. Introduced as part of 4 new rides for the 2026 season by new owners Premier Attractions. Installed with "5 year temporary consent". |
| Wipeout | 2007 | Vekoma | Boomerang | Relocated from the closed American Adventure Theme Park in Derbyshire, where it was known as "Missile". The region's biggest roller coaster. Height limit 1.3m. Riders are taken backwards 34m in the air, and then released to reach speeds of up to 50 mph. After going through 3 inversions, the process repeats in reverse. |

=== Flat rides ===
| Ride | Opened | Manufacturer | Model | Description |
|---|---|---|---|---|
| Jolly Roger | 2012 | Fabbri | Drop Tower | A 131 ft (40-metre) freefall drop tower that accelerates to 60 mph in under a second; height limit 1.4m. A Fabbri Scary Drop 40 model. The ride travelled from 2000 to 2011 with various showmen, until its arrival at the park permanently for the 2012 season. Features a loose pirate theme. |
| Waveswinger | 2016 | Zierer | Waveswinger | A Zierer Wave Swinger attraction. Height limit 1m accompanied and 1.25m unaccompanied. Previously travelled around the Australian fair circuit. Installed in 2016 at the park, to replace Sky Hooks and Tales of the Coast. First Waveswinger at the park since 1997. |
| Shiver Me Timbers | 1985 | Huss | Pirate Ship | Swinging pirate ship themed ride; height limit 1m adult accompanied, 1.3m unaccompanied. Formerly operated at OK Corral in France as Bateau Pirate from the 1980s to 1984. Was loaned at first by original owner Bembom Rides, but Pleasurewood Hills took the option to buy the ride. |
| Riptide | 2026 | AK Rides | Star Flyer | A 30m tall vertical swing ride located on the previous Tide Traveller ride site. The family-thrill ride has been introduced as part of 4 new rides for the 2026 season by new owners Premier Attractions. Installed with "5 year temporary consent". |

=== Water rides ===
| Ride | Opened | Manufacturer | Model | Description |
|---|---|---|---|---|
| Water Fun Factory | 1992 | Reverchon | Log Flume | This 235 long log flume ride opened in 1992 as 'White Water Falls'. Later painted and renamed 'Mellow Yellow', and then re-themed as 'Timber Falls' in 2009. Height limit 1.25m unless adult accompanied. For the 2020 season, it was announced the ride would be re themed to Water Fun Factory, featuring new theming structures. |
| Wavebreaker | 1996 | WhiteWater West | Dinghy slide | A two-lane dinghy slide. |

=== Dark rides ===
| Ride | Opened | Manufacturer | Model | Description |
|---|---|---|---|---|
| Rootin Tootin Target Trail | 1983 | Supercar Leisure | Ghost Train | A UV themed laser shooter dark ride aimed at the family market, with a Wild Western theme, opening in 2017. Guests under 1.1m must be accompanied by an adult. Was previously Hobs Pitt a horror dark ride that had a 12 age restriction, from 2013 until 2017. |

=== Transportation and observation rides ===
| Ride | Opened | Manufacturer | Model | Description |
|---|---|---|---|---|
| Pleasurewood Hills Express | 1984 | | Railway | 24 Gauge small railway. Three carriages with benches. Seats around 30. Originally a Chance Rides; C.P. Huntington. Repainted for the 2022 season. |
| Woodland Express | 1984 | | Railway | 7.25 Gauge small railway. Three carriages with single in line seating. Seats around 15–20. Repainted for the 2021 season and renamed. |
| Chairlifts | 1987 | Pohlig | Ropeway | Chairlift taking guest from one end of the park to the other. Previously called Merry-Go-Straight. Taking you from the Farm yard Area to the kids sector queues often are long here. |
| Woody's Wheel | 2026 | Güven Lunapark | Ferris Wheel 36m | A 36m tall big wheel ride located on a previously unused plot beside Wipeout. The observation ride has been introduced as part of 4 new rides for the 2026 season by new owners Premier Attractions. Installed with "5 year temporary consent". |

=== Children's rides ===
| Ride | Opened | Manufacturer | Model | Description |
|---|---|---|---|---|
| Woody Copters | 1998 | Modern Products | Junior Ferris Wheel | Junior ferris wheel themed to the park's mascot Woody Bear |
| Safari | 1984 | Supercar Leisure | Track Ride | Vintage car ride travelling round a themed safari fixed track. Rethemed in 2023. |
| Bumpercar Garage | 1995 | I.E. Park | Dodgems | Dodgems rethemed in 2019 into the farmyard area |
| Carousel | 2001 | Concept 1900 | Carousel | Duel Carousel replacing the previous single deck Carousel. |
| Kite Flyer | 2004 | Zamperla | Kite Flyer | Lay down central spin ride; height limit 1.05m. |
| Up and Away | 2004 | Zamperla | Samba Balloon | Hot air balloon themed central spin ride; height limit 0.9m. Refurbished 2019 to fit in with the farmyard area. In 2020 the concrete floor around it was replaced with artificial grass.Previously known as Balloon Rays. |
| Funky Flyers | 2008 | Chance Rides | Junior Jets | Central spin plane themed ride. |
| Giddy Up | 2012 | Metallbau Emmeln | Pony Trek | A Pony track based ride. Previously named 'Pleasurewood Ponies', was rethemed for 2023. Relocated from Loudoun Castle. |
| Mini Twister | 2002 | S&W Amusement Sales | Junior Scrambler | Junior twister ride |
| Flying Elephants | 1998 | Modern Products | Junior Jets | |
| Lighthouse | 2012 | Zamperla | Junior Drop Tower | A child's lift and drop tower. Relocated from Loudoun Castle. |
| Moby Dick | 2013 | Vekoma | Sea Storm | A whale themed flat ride relocated from Avonturenpark Hellendoorn |
| Woody's Tea Party | 2013 | SBF Visa Group | Junior Teacups | A small tea cup flat ride |

=== Shows ===
| Ride | Opened | Description |
|---|---|---|
| Sea Lion Splash | 1987 | A firm family favourite at the park for over 20 years, the show runs 12pm and 3pm daily. |
| Birds of Paradise | 1984 | Existing in various locations throughout its time at the park, the parrot show runs 1pm and 4pm daily. |

*Temporary ride names as planning permission is sought.

== Past Rides ==
| Ride | Manufacturer | Year Opened | Year Closed | Description |
|---|---|---|---|---|
| Calypso Twist | Emmo Kreekel | 1985 | 1994 | Loaned to the park by Bembom Rides. Was manufactured by Emmo Kreekel being a traditional twist ride. Later moved and leased to Loudoun Castle. Now operates at Adventure Coast Southport as Twister. |
| Carousel | Zierer | 1985 | 1997 | First operated at OK Corral in France under ownership of the Bembom family. Introduced as part of a package of rides at the park loaned by Bembom Rides. Later loaned to Pluton Park in Spain around 2000 and later operated at Loudoun Castle from 2003 to 2010. |
| Eye In The Sky | Schwarzkopf | 1994 | 1998 | An converted observation tower attraction introduced by Bembom Rides that formerly operated at Dreamland Margate. Now operates at Attractiepark Slagharen in the Netherlands since 1999 as Sky Tower. |
| Fireball | KMG | 2004 | 2020 | A KMG Afterburner 5G spinning pendulum ride; height limit 1.4m. Previously named Wizzy Dizzy. Removed for the 2021 season and was sold to German showman Thilo Janssen. |
| Frisbe | Fabbri | 2003 | 2003 | Avenger frisbee ride built by Fabbri that operated under loan. Ran at Dreamland Margate from 2001 to 2002 and now travels the United Arab Emirates with Freij Entertainment International. |
| Hobs Pit | —N/a | 2013 | 2017 | An indoor ride dubbed 'one of the UK's scariest attractions', with a 12A restriction. This ride was removed and replaced with 'Rootin' Tootin' Target Trail' to support the parks emphasis on family fun. |
| Octopus | Soriani & Moser | 2003 | 2003 | Owned by UK showman Bertie Ayers Jnr. and operated under loan at the park during 2003. |
| Phoenix | HUSS | 1989 | 1998 | A classic HUSS Enterprise attraction leased to the park by Bembom Rides. Previously operated at OK Corral in France and under loan at Ocean Beach Fun Fair in Rhyl. Was known as Enterprise for most of its operation, later being rethemed to Phoenix during its final year. Later operated briefly under loan at Pluton Park in Spain, Grove Land in Wales and later operated at Loudoun Castle until it was removed. Now located at Avonturenpark Hellendoorn in the Netherlands as Tarantula Magica. |
| Rotor | De Boer | 1985 | 1987 | Classic Round Up attraction that operated at the park under lease from Bembom Rides. Moved to Attractiepark Slagharen in the Netherlands and then Loudoun Castle. Now located at Treasure Island Amusement Park in Stourport-on-Severn. |
| Single Deck Carousel | —N/a | —N/a | 2001 | Single deck Carousel was replaced by the Double Deck Carousel in 2001. |
| Tales of the Coast (originally Voyage to Aladdin's Cave) | Mack Rides | 1983 | 2016 | A boat ride through an artificial cave, featuring a voice over telling ghost stories and local legends from the coast with blacklight animatronics, mannequins and scenes corresponding to the stories. The ride was removed in 2016, partly due to age, and the space filled with an eating area and the new Waveswinger ride. |
| The Tempest | Weber | 1990 | 1994 | A Weber Traum Boot inverted pirate ship loaned to the park by Bembom Rides. Replaced by Mini Dodgems. Relocated to Camelot Theme Park as Excailbur where it ran from 1995 to 2000 and later operated at OK Corral in France as Le Sabre from 2004 until 2018. |
| The Tide Traveller | HUSS | 2005 | 2017 | A HUSS Tri-Star previously called Thunderstruck; height limit 1.25m. Formerly operated at Flamingo Land as Flamingo Star from 1995 to 2004. Last year of operation was around 2016. In 2014, the section where the ride lifted up was removed due to not working anymore and the ride operated for a few years without lifting up. |
| Troika | HUSS | 1985 | 1995 | A HUSS Troika ride owned by Bembom Rides that previously operated at Barry Island Pleasure Park under loan. |
| Waveswinger | Zierer | 1988 | 1996 | Classic Waveswinger attraction provided by Bembom Rides that ran at the park from 1988 to 1996. Later operated at Loudoun Castle and Pluton Park under loan. Later sold to UK showman Billy Stevens and now travels the United Arab Emirates with Freij Entertainment International. |
