= Wipeout (roller coaster) =

Roller coaster located at Pleasurewood Hills theme park in Lowestoft, England

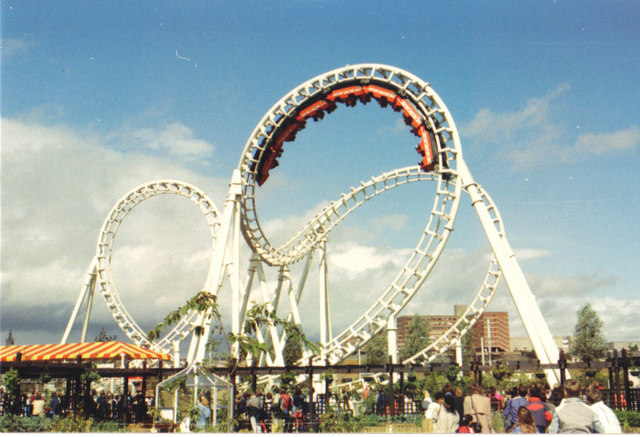
- In its original incarnation as the Coca Cola Roller at the 1988 Glasgow Garden Festival

Pleasurewood Hills
- Location: Pleasurewood Hills
- Coordinates: 52.5075°N 1.7434°E
- Status: Operating
- Opening date: 2007

General statistics
- Type: Steel – Shuttle – Boomerang
- Manufacturer: Vekoma
- Model: Boomerang
- Track layout: Steel
- Lift/launch system: Chain
- Height: 120 ft (37 m)
- Drop: 110 ft (34 m)
- Length: 935 ft (285 m)
- Speed: 50 mph (80 km/h)
- Inversions: 6 (3 forward and 3 backward)
- Capacity: 760 riders per hour
- G-force: 5.2
- Height restriction: 130 cm (4 ft 3 in)
- Trains: Single train with 7 cars; riders arranged 2 across in 2 rows for a total of 28 riders per train
- Wipeout at RCDB

Wipeout (formerly Coca-Cola Roller and Missile) is a roller coaster located at Pleasurewood Hills theme park in Lowestoft, Suffolk, England. Vekoma designed the roller coaster. Wipeout uses a boomerang design.

== History ==
The roller coaster was first opened in 1988 as the Coca-Cola Roller at the Glasgow Garden Festival. That same year it was sold to the American Adventure in Derbyshire under the name Missile. It stayed at the park until the 2005 season, when it was closed down, dismantled, and taken to Pleasurewood Hills. It did not open during the 2006 season due to planning problems. It opened for the 2007 season under the name "Wipeout". It has a surfer theme and is painted blue. The coaster will receive new trains for the 2025 season.

== Ride Experience ==
The roller coaster is a boomerang ride wherein the train is taken backwards up a hill. At the top of the hill, the train is released and picks up speed. At that point, pictures are automatically taken of the riders (who can buy souvenir pictures at the beach hut themed stall after the ride). The train then speeds through the station at its top speed, and then goes through a cobra roll and a vertical loop. It then climbs to the top of a second hill. At the top, it is released and goes back through the vertical loop and cobra roll before resting in the station.
