= Cannonball Express =

Cannonball Express may refer to:

== Locomotives ==
- Cannbonball or Cannonball Express, a steam locomotive operated by Casey Jones
- Cannonball (LIRR train), running weekly as Cannonball Express on the Long Island Rail Road
- The Cannonball Christmas Express, a special excursion train operated by the Tavares, Eustis & Gulf Railroad
- Wabash Cannon Ball (train), an express train line on the Wabash Railroad

== Railroads and rides ==
- Cannonball Express (roller coaster), a roller coaster located at Pleasurewood Hills, Corton, Near Lowestoft, Suffolk
- Dreamworld Express, a narrow gauge railway located at the Dreamworld theme park and originally named Cannonball Express
- Wabash Cannonball Express Railroad, a miniature train ride at the Indiana Beach amusement park

== Other uses ==
- Cannonball Express (film), a 1932 film produced by Sono Art-World Wide Pictures
- Cannonball Express, a planet in the fictional Known Space universe created by Larry Niven
- The Cannonball Express, a song by jazz singer Peggy Lee
- The Cannonball Express, a band formed by the American electric blues guitarist, vocalist and songwriter, Toronzo Cannon
- "Wabash Cannonball", an American folk song about a fictional Wabash Cannonball Express train
