= Twist n' Shout =

Steel looping roller coaster

Big Blue
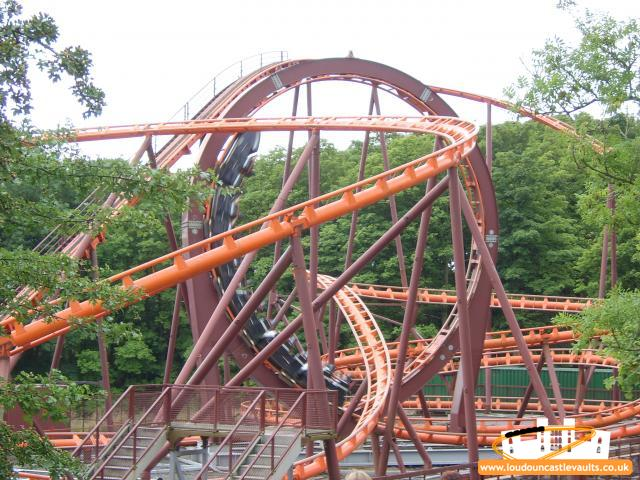
- Twist n' Shout on its Vertical Loop element.

Loudoun Castle
- Location: Loudoun Castle
- Coordinates: 55.61039°N 4.36886°W
- Status: Removed
- Opening date: April 2003
- Closing date: 2010

General statistics
- Type: Steel
- Manufacturer: Anton Schwarzkopf
- Designer: Werner Stengel
- Model: Silverarrow
- Lift/launch system: Chain lift hill
- Height: 60.7 ft (18.5 m)
- Length: 1,817.6 ft (554.0 m)
- Speed: 41 mph (66 km/h)
- Inversions: 1
- Duration: 1:48
- Capacity: 1500 riders per hour
- Trains: 6 cars; riders arranged 2 across in 2 rows for a total of 24 riders per train
- Big Blue at RCDB

Big Blue is a steel looping roller coaster, located at Dalmaland, Croatia, and operating there since 2017. It was formerly located at Loudoun Castle Theme Park in Galston, south-west Scotland, where it was known as Twist n'Shout; operating from 2003 to 2010.

Additionally, the ride was at Camelot Theme Park from 1989 to 2000, and then at Dreamland Margate from 2001 to 2002, both of whom rented it from Loudoun Castle's owner.

== History ==
The ride was designed by Anton Schwarzkopf as one of his Silverarrow model looping coasters. Only three of these were ever built: Twist n' Shout, Scorpion at Busch Gardens Tampa Bay in America, and the other is said to be in a travelling funfair in Africa.

Purchased by the Bembom family, the ride debuted at OK Corral, in France, in the early 1980's, before being moved to the United Kingdom in 1987, where it then operated at the Ocean Beach Amusement park in Rhyl, North Wales.

In 1989, the ride was moved to Camelot Theme Park in Lancashire, England, and was rebranded as the Tower of Terror. The ride was themed around a castle, which concealed the loop, and was one of the park's most popular attractions.

Tower of Terror closed in 2000, following the end of its lease agreement with the ride's owners, and also to make way for a planned Vekoma Invertigo rollercoaster. While it was being dismantled, some sparks from a saw hit the foam castle theming, destroying it in the process. The ride suffered some scorch marks, but was otherwise unscathed.

Following this, the rollercoaster was moved to Dreamland Margate, where it operated as Looping Star, from 2001 to 2002.

It opened in 2003 at Loudoun Castle, as a part of the new rides line-up brought in by new owner, Henk Bembom. For the 2007 season, the trains were given a "mine train" theme. Twist n' Shout remained one of the most popular rides in the park until its closure in 2010.

After the 2010 season, Twist n' Shout closed with the park. It remained standing but not operating from 2010 to 2016, and was listed for sale through amusement ride reseller Ital International.

In July 2017, the ride was moved to the new Fun Park Mirnovec (now Dalmaland) in Croatia, where it now operates as Big Blue.

== Layout and model information ==
Twist n' Shout has a fairly simple and twisted layout involving a single vertical loop as the signature element. After the train is carried 60 feet into the air, riders twist down a drop and pass through the single vertical loop element. Following the loop, the train goes through a pretzel turnaround and threads the vertical loop. The train circles around a 900° helix and enters the brake run.

Twist n' Shout is one of only 3 remaining Silver Arrow Coasters designed by Anton Schwarzkopf – the other two being Scorpion at Busch Gardens Tampa, and Looping Star which is part of a travelling funfair called "Magic World" in Africa.
