= The American Adventure Theme Park =

Former theme park in Ilkeston, Derbyshire, England

American Adventure
- Previously known as Britannia Park, American Adventure World
- Interactive map of American Adventure
- Location: Heanor, Derbyshire, England
- Coordinates: 52°59′41″N 1°20′06″W
- Opened: June 1987
- Closed: 4 January 2007

The American Adventure was a theme park in Derbyshire, England. For many years, the park had a number of large white-knuckle attractions, before being rethemed as a 'family' park aimed at the under-14 market in 2005. In January 2007, the owners of the park announced that it would not reopen for the new season, and the rides would be sold off.

== History ==
The American Adventure, built on an area of Country Park which had been subject to deep seam and opencast coal mining, was originally opened in June 1987 with an Old West and Cowboys vs. Native Americans theme. A theme park called Britannia Park had been opened on the site in 1985 but closed after just ten weeks, insolvent, and its founder Peter Kellard was later imprisoned for fraud. Derbyshire County Council purchased the site in 1986 and sold it to the conglomerate Granada, which in June 1987 opened the American Adventure, heralded as Britain's Major New Theme Park.

Initial attractions at the American Adventure included the two-drop log flume Cherokee Falls, the runaway mine train, the Buffalo Stampede roller coaster, a pirate ship and a Ferris wheel.

In 1989, the original theme expanded to other elements of North American culture and history. This involved an area themed around space travel, featuring the Missile roller coaster, a Vekoma Boomerang coaster which was at the time voted the best roller coaster in the UK. Shortly before this there was the Canadian themed addition of the Rocky Mountain Rapids. In the same year, the Assault Course round in the junior version of The Krypton Factor (known as Young Krypton) was filmed. In 1993, the log-flume was extended to have a third drop and was renamed from Cherokee Falls to Nightmare Niagara. The extra drop made it the tallest log flume in the UK throughout its operational life (this record was reverted to Loggers Leap at Thorpe Park as this ride used to hold the record before the new drop was added, and when that closed in 2015, the title went to Tiger Rock at Chessington World of Adventures). In 1995, the Iron Wolf roller coaster (now located in a Polish theme park and known as the Tic Tac Tornado) was installed, which broke away from the American theming of the park and was instead themed around the ITV gameshow Gladiators.

From 1996 onwards, the park began to decline, and in 1997, Granada sold it to the company Ventureworld which was headed by John Broome, former chairman of Alton Towers. During this period, the only notable change was the addition of minor upcharge attractions.

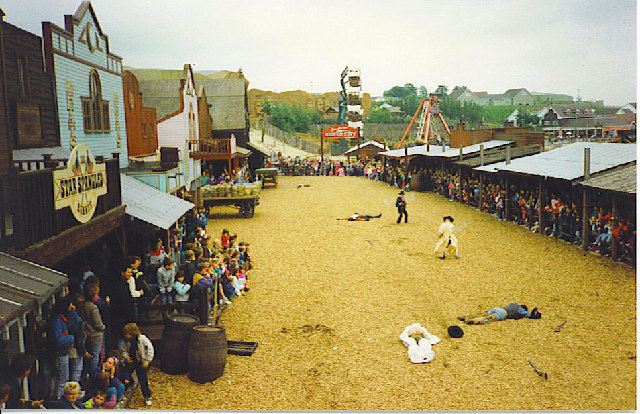
American Adventure in 1991

Ventureworld immediately renamed the park American Adventure World, with the intention of dropping the American theming and ultimately renaming the park Adventure World. Various logos produced over the next few seasons would use the "American Adventure World" name, but with the prominence of the first and last words varying wildly. By the end of the park's life, the title had reverted to The American Adventure.

In 1999, Broome announced his departure. The leisure group owned by Trevor Hemmings, which also owned Pontins and Blackpool Tower, bought the park. After 1999, many of the smaller rides were removed from the park, and it slowly fell into decline. The old main entrance to the park had to be closed due to subsidence, and the new entrance was much less attractive.

2005 saw the closing down of three major rides for which the park was famous, including Nightmare Niagara and The Missile. At the time, it was also believed that the Rocky Mountain Rapids was also ending its life. The two water rides were supposedly closed due to structural instability and water pollution problems, whilst the Missile was not deemed to fit in with the park's new 'family' label and had also experienced heavy disrepair. Missile was relocated to Pleasurewood Hills as 'Wipeout'. At the start of the season, the pirate ship ride called the Yankee Clipper was closed with the intention of it being reopened later in the season. However, due to refurbishment taking longer than planned it did not open until the following season.

2006 was the final year the theme park operated. There were some signs of investment and heavy emphasis on the new 'family' image. New rides included the Mini Mine Rush, a kids roller coaster, now relocated at Flamingo Land, a new motorbike attraction in the building previously used for the log flume station, as well as the re-opening of the newly refurbished Rocky Mountain Rapids and Yankee Clipper rides.

=== Closure ===
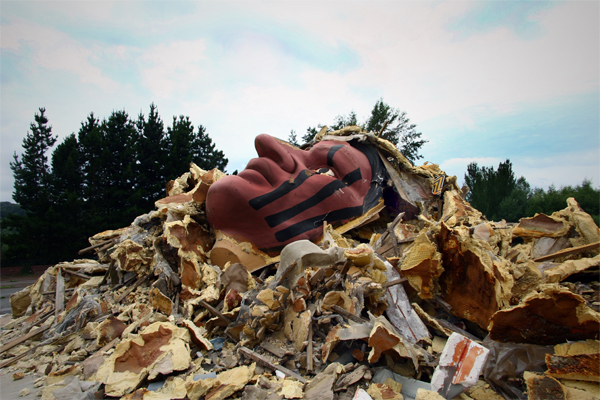
Remnants of the theme park in July 2009

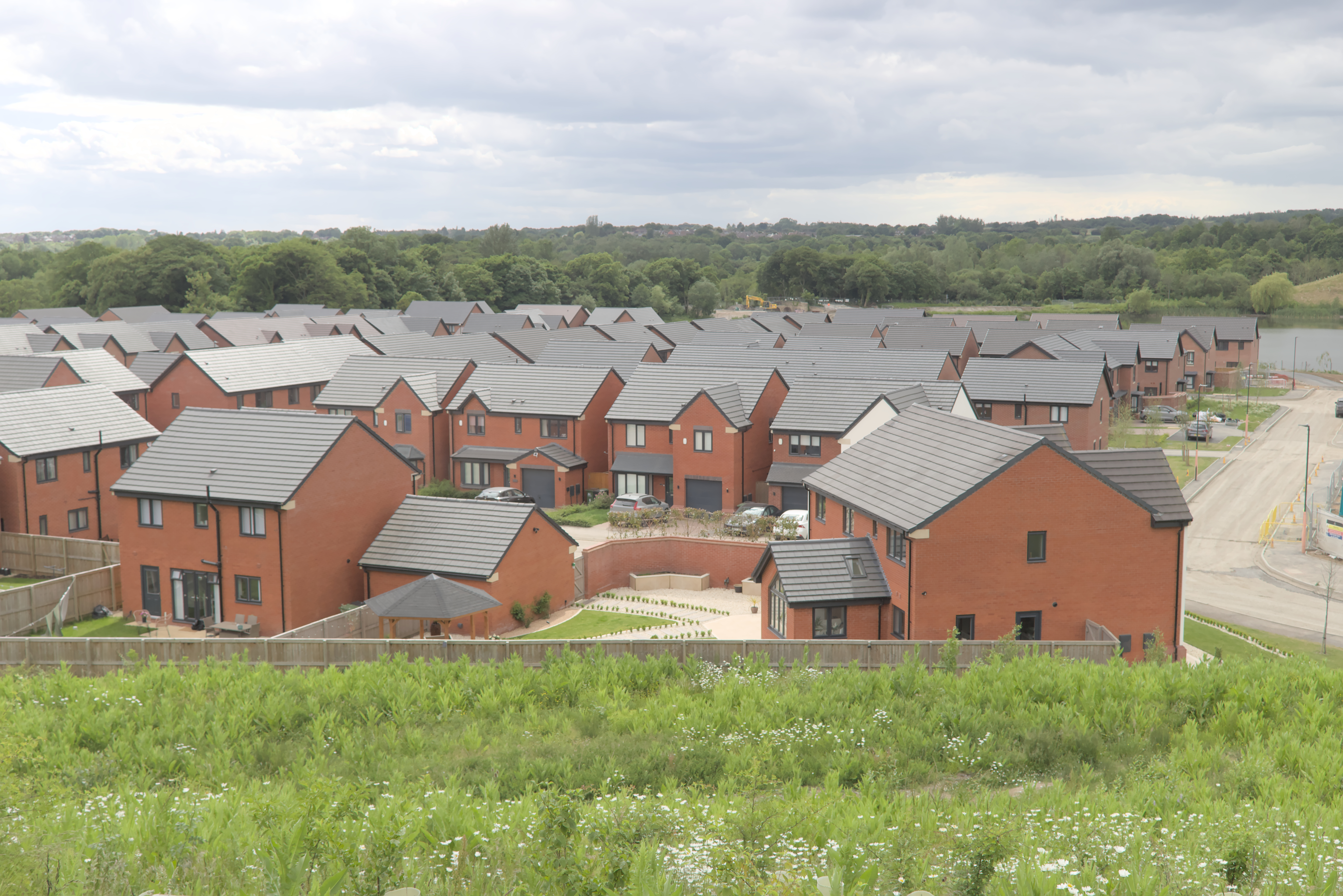
Housing at Shipley Lakeside, June 2026

After 19 years of operating, American Adventure announced on 4 January 2007 that the park would not be reopening for the 2007 season.

Derbyshire County Council reviewed options for the site's future, stating that they would only allow minimal development on the site. Part of the park has been leased, while the rest is being controlled by Derbyshire County Council. The park has been given the name "Shipley Lakeside" and the land was listed for sale on the Derbyshire County Council land. The park has since been demolished to make way for development. In 2008, three potential buyers expressed an interest in purchasing the land. In July 2012, it was announced that a project to redevelop the land into "housing, offices and leisure facilities" had been given the green light.

The popularity of the theme park was such that in 2017, thousands signed a petition to reopen it. In 2020, OnTrack Productions began selling park pin badges and set up a Facebook page for the park. Due to the success of this, a 6 part documentary is being made by OnTrack Productions.

== Notable rides ==
Opened	Closed	Ride Name	Manufacturer	Notes
1987	2004	"Nightmare Niagara"	Big Country Motioneering	A log flume. Extended in 1993 to include the UK's tallest drop on a water ride.
1987	2006	"Runaway Train"	Big Country Motioneering	A powered rollercoaster. Sold to showman James Mellors.
1987	2006	"Buffalo Stampede"	Zamperla	A powered rollercoaster. Moved to Twinlakes Theme Park, where it still operates.
1987	2006	"Santa Fe Railroad"	Severn Lamb	A miniature railway circling the park. Moved to Twinlakes Theme Park, where it still operates.
1987	2006	"Yankee Clipper"	Zamperla	A Pirate Ship (ride). Relocated to Twinlakes Theme Park as "Gladiator's Galleon".
1987	2006	"High Sierra"	Zamperla	A wagon themed Ferris wheel. Relocated to Billing Aquadrome.
1987	2006	"Tennessee Tentacles"	Soriani & Moser	A polyp ride. Now operates at Haghtanak Park in Armenia.
1987	2006	"Custer's Carousel"	Chance Rides	A modern gallopers ride. It reopened at The Flambards Experience in 2007 and operated until the park closed in 2024.
1987	2004	"Starbase Slide"		An astroglide slide.
1988	2006	"Rocky Mountain Rapids"	Big Country Motioneering	A River Rapids Ride.
1988	2006	"Balloon Ride"	Zamperla	A Balloon Race.
1989	2004	"The Missile"	Vekoma	A boomerang rollercoaster. Moved to Pleasurewood Hills as "Wipeout".
1989		"Black Hole"	HUSS Park Attractions	A HUSS Ben Hur (swirl) ride. Previously operated as "Ben Hur" at Blackpool Pleasure Beach.
1991	1993	"Canyon Trip"	Vekoma	A Canyon Trip ride. It was relocated to Camelot Theme Park where it operated as "The Rack" from 1994 to 2009 and was then scrapped.
1991	1994	"Dive Bomber"	Lusse	A traditional dive bomber ride. Previously operated at Coney Beach Pleasure Park between 1947 and 1973.
1995	2006	"Twin Looper"	Soquet	A double loop rollercoaster, previously named "Iron Wolf". Originally operated at Lightwater Valley from 1988 to 1994.
1998	1999	"Flying Island"	Vekoma	An observation tower.
2006	2006	"Mini Mine Rush"	Zamperla	An 80STD children's rollercoaster, relocated from Gulliver's Land, Warrington. Now operates as "Runaway Mine Train" at Flamingo Land.
2006	2006	"Rockin' Tug"	Zamperla	A Rockin Tug ride. It reopened at The Flambards Experience in 2007 and operated until the park closed in 2024.
