= Hyperia (roller coaster) =

Roller coaster in England

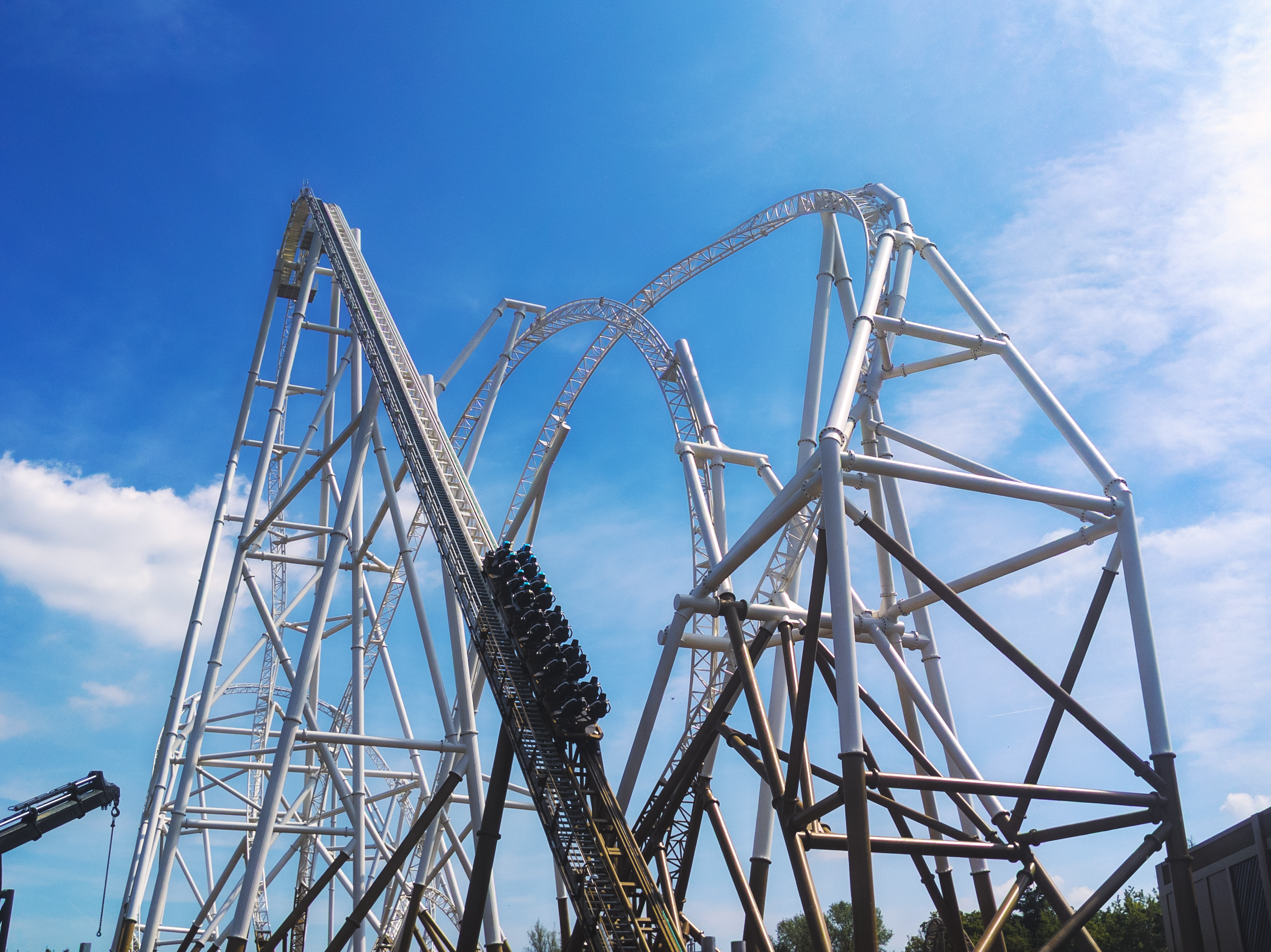
- Hyperia (May 2024)

Thorpe Park
- Location: Thorpe Park
- Park section: Fearless Valley
- Coordinates: 51.401661°N 0.512266°W
- Status: Operating
- Opening date: 24 May 2024
- Cost: £17.67 million
- Replaced: Loggers Leap; Rocky Express

General statistics
- Type: Steel
- Manufacturer: Mack Rides
- Model: Hyper Coaster
- Lift/launch system: Chain lift hill
- Height: 71.93 m (236.0 ft)
- Length: 995.4 m (3,266 ft)
- Speed: 80 mph (130 km/h)
- Inversions: 2
- Duration: 1:30
- Capacity: 1000 riders per hour
- Restraint style: Lap bar
- Height restriction: 130 cm (4 ft 3 in)
- Trains: 2 trains with 5 cars; riders arranged 2 across in 2 rows for a total of 20 riders per train
- Website: Official site
- Fastrack (basic, platinum, gold) available (Limited)
- Single rider line available
- Wheelchair accessible
- Hyperia at RCDB

Hyperia is a steel roller coaster located at Thorpe Park in Surrey, England. Manufactured by Mack Rides, the hypercoaster opened as the tallest and fastest roller coaster in the United Kingdom on 24 May 2024, with a height of 236 feet (72 m) and a maximum speed that reaches 80 mph (130 km/h). It also features two inversions and was built on the site formerly occupied by Loggers Leap. Hyperia suffered a series of setbacks during its inaugural season, including an unexpected closure the day after its grand opening that lasted two and a half weeks. A later sponsorship with Flipz saw the ride temporarily renamed to 'Flipzeria' between 13 August 2026 and 3 September 2026.

== History ==
Loggers Leap opened in 1989 in the southern corner of the park, where it became the tallest log flume in the UK at the time of its debut. The ride operated through to 2015, but failed to open the following year and was addressed by park representatives as being "under redevelopment". In February 2019, Thorpe Park confirmed that the attraction had been permanently closed, stating that "the area [which] Logger's Leap once dominated will be forming part of our long term development plans". The rest of Old Town closed permanently in October 2021, which included the retirement of the park's Rocky Express and Timber Tug Boat. Lumber Jump was rethemed as High Striker and relocated to the Amity area of the park for the 2022 season.

In December 2021, Thorpe Park held a public consultation for their new coaster project in Old Town, releasing various renders and information online. Codenamed Project Exodus, the proposed ride promised to become the tallest coaster in the UK at 236 feet (72 m) tall, displacing The Big One's 213-foot (65 m) height at Blackpool Pleasure Beach after nearly three decades. Although a manufacturer was not revealed, park officials confirmed that a "noise comparison survey" was conducted on a similar ride operating in Turkey, leading to speculation that Mack Rides was the manufacturer.

=== Planning and construction ===
On 14 March 2022, Thorpe Park submitted an extensive planning application to Runnymede Borough Council detailing the proposed redevelopments of Old Town and Project Exodus' construction. Project Exodus was to be situated on the site of the former Loggers Leap and Rocky Express attractions. While the council eventually supported the park's development, sustained flood risk concerns from the Environment Agency prompted a project referral to the Secretary of State, who made no objections to the project.

The council officially granted permission for Project Exodus on 2 November 2022, although the application's case officer would later criticise the Environment Agency's communication during the planning process, stating that: "A rollercoaster which was partly in the functional flood plain was never going to be straight forward planning application but it should not have been as difficult as it was. We had a positive working relationship with both the planning agents, Lichfields UK, and the applicant, Thorpe Park. The difficulty was the lack of ability to engage effectively with the Environment Agency. I'm sure the level of service they are providing or lack thereof, is not how they want to deal with matters".

Throughout its construction phase, Thorpe Park made substantial efforts to keep the public engaged on the coaster's progress. In February 2023, Mack Rides was officially confirmed as the manufacturer. Further details were submitted to the council in May 2023, depicting a pearl gold and papyrus white colour scheme – the structure's upper sections would be painted white in order to reduce its visual impact outside of the park. The coaster's trains were subsequently unveiled to the public on 12 April.

==== Construction timeline ====
2022
- 2 November; Project Exodus approved by Runnymede Borough Council.
- December; Demolition begins on Logger's Leap and the Old Town area.
2023
- 9 January; Ride foundation cages delivered to the park.
- April; Construction crews mark out locations for the structure's foundations.
- July; Track production begins at Mack Rides' factory in Baden-Württemberg, Germany.
- 22 July; First delivery of coaster supports arrive from Mack Rides.
- 28 September; First coaster track pieces arrive at Thorpe Park.
- 9 October; First support structure pieces installed at the ride's outerbank.
- 11 October; First track sections lifted into place.
- 16 October; Steel framework begins to be set up for the coaster's station.
- 22 October; A separate set of steel framework begins going up for the maintenance shed.
2024
- 29 February; The first drop has been mostly completed, with only lift hill track pieces left to be installed.
- 1 March; The last piece of track, a straight lift hill piece, has been delivered to the construction site.
- 6 March; Track is completed with the crest of the lift hill being placed in, making it the tallest roller coaster in the UK by 23 feet (7.0 m), overtaking the previous record held by The Big One at Blackpool Pleasure Beach at 213 feet (65 m).
- 6 April; Test preparations start and transfer tracks begin moving.
- 16 April; First test run cycle is completed.
- 23 May; A press event is held and first public riders board.
- 24 May; Hyperia officially opens to the public.
- 25 May; Hyperia unexpectedly closes without explanation, and the reopening is delayed multiple times.
- 12 June; Hyperia officially reopens to the public.
- 15 June; The ride is closed for one day following an incident stranding riders on the lift hill.
- 19 June; The ride closes again in what the park calls "unforeseen circumstances". A reopening date is not announced.
- 22 June; Hyperia reopens again.

=== Marketing ===
On 9 February 2023, Thorpe Park launched Club 236, a passholder competition to visit the park with the chance of being among the coaster's first public riders in 2024. In August 2023, it was announced that Project Exodus would not only be the UK's tallest coaster, but also the fastest.

During the development phase, Merlin Entertainments – through the alias Vista Maxima Services Ltd – initially filed a trademark for ICARUS in March 2023. However, HYPERIA was submitted later on in August, and would go on to become the final name of the ride. Hyperia was formally announced on 5 October 2023 and was accompanied by a promotional video that not only introduced the coaster's name but also presented its slogan, "Find your fearless". The video further provided a point-of-view (POV) glimpse into the ride experience. On 27 March 2024, opening day was set for 24 May.

=== Opening ===
Hyperia officially opened to the public as scheduled on 24 May 2024. However, it closed unexpectedly the following day on 25 May, with the resort stating the closure was "due to unforeseen circumstances" and expected to last until at least 29 May. On 28 May 2024, the expected closure was extended until 8 June. Thorpe Park delayed the reopening indefinitely on 6 June 2024, only stating that Hyperia would not reopen on 8 June, but the reopening date was eventually set as 12 June. A spokesperson for the park said the closure was related to "standard technical pre-opening procedure checks" but did not elaborate further.

After several days of operation following the reopening, an incident occurred on 15 June 2024, stranding riders on the lift hill. Guests were safely evacuated and Hyperia reopened the following day. The ride was closed again indefinitely on 19 June 2024, with Thorpe Park stating the closure was due to "unforeseen circumstances". It reopened on 22 June 2024.

Single-use Hyperia fast track tickets were made available during the summer for the price of £20 per person.

== Characteristics ==
=== Statistics ===
Hyperia is 236 feet (72 m) tall and has a track length of 3,265.7 feet (995.4 m). Hyperia's height is a new record in the UK, surpassing The Big One at Blackpool Pleasure Beach by 23 feet (7.0 m). Its maximum speed is reported to exceed 80 mph (130 km/h), overtaking the speed record in the UK from Stealth, which is also located at Thorpe Park. The coaster features two inversions: a barrel roll downdrop and a stalled dive loop. Hyperia runs with two 20-passenger trains, each of which contains five cars seating riders in two rows of two.

=== Etymology ===
Hyperia is themed to a fictional goddess named Hyperia. Hyperia's backstory is that she is the daughter of an ancient river god who became imprisoned on an island due to her fear of water. She crafted a set of steel wings that enabled her to conquer her fear of water and escape, becoming a symbol of "triumph over adversity". The ride is marketed under the slogan, "Find your fearless".

=== Ride Experience ===
The ride experience begins with the train departing from the station and entering an outer-banked right-hand turn before ascending the 236 ft (72 m) chain lift hill. After cresting the peak, the train drops at a 90-degree vertical angle while completing a 180-degree lateral rotation. It then navigates a non-inverting Immelmann, followed by an outer-banked barrel roll down drop and a stalled dive loop. A short brake trim section moderates the train's speed before it ascends an outer-banked airtime hill. The train continues through a final turn near the lake and rises over a concluding airtime hill before entering the brake run and finally the station.

=== Design process ===
Constructing a large-scale roller coaster using the limited plot of land available proved to be a logistical challenge. Merlin Entertainments initially accepted a pitch from Bolliger & Mabillard before contracting Mack Rides for the project. This was a first for Mack Rides, as it was the first Mack Rides hyper coaster with a custom layout. Their first layout for Project Exodus was drafted in September 2020; eight more pitches followed, with the sixth iteration ultimately selected in April 2021 and being adjusted into the final product. Merlin sought a classic hyper coaster with a large camelback airtime hill leading out of the first drop, but the space limitations rendered it impractical.

=== Soundtrack ===
The attraction features a prominent original soundtrack produced by IMAscore. Upon dispatch from the station, a 16-second excerpt from the main musical theme is played, synchronized with lighting and smoke effects to enhance the immersive experience. When trains return to the station, the same musical excerpt is replayed, timed to coincide with the release of the lap restraints at the conclusion of the track. The soundtrack is also audible during the ascent of the chain lift hill, facilitated by speakers installed along the lift's catwalk.

The soundtrack was released on a limited-edition vinyl record on 24 August 2025.

== Awards ==
Golden Ticket Awards: Top steel Roller Coasters
Year									1998	1999
Ranking									–	–
Year	2000	2001	2002	2003	2004	2005	2006	2007	2008	2009
Ranking	–	–	–	–	–	–	–	–	–	–
Year	2010	2011	2012	2013	2014	2015	2016	2017	2018	2019
Ranking	–	–	–	–	–	–	–	–	–	–
Year	2020	2021	2022	2023	2024	2025				
Ranking	N/A	–	–	–	–	39				
