= Breakdance (ride) =

Amusement ride

in operation

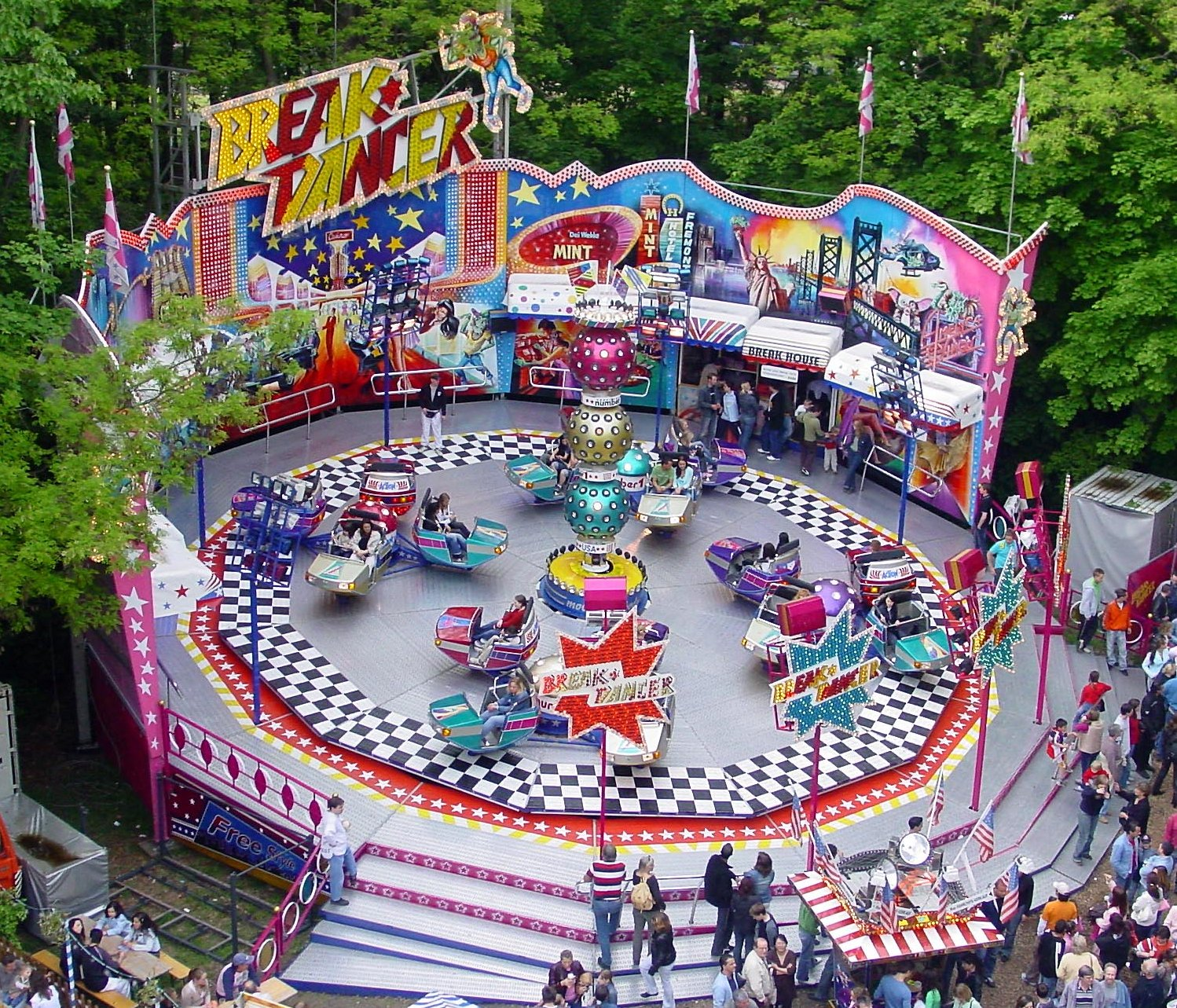
Breakdance, Frankfurt Main - Germany

Breakdance is an amusement ride designed by Huss Maschinenfabrik GmbH & Co. KG in 1985.

Upon release, the ride design proved to be an instant hit, with HUSS now producing five varying designs, all of which can be acquired in transportable, semi-permanent, or permanent forms.

== Design and operation ==
Breakdance consists of a dodecagonal platform with a diameter of 20 meters, upon which are mounted four hubs, each bearing four two-person cars. The entire ride is on an incline of 7.5°. When the ride is activated, the platform rotates, the hubs rotate in the opposite direction to the platform. The combination of the platform slope, hub movement, and weight displacement within the cars cause them to rock back and forth, the oblique join mount and the motion of the ride allowing the cars to rotate through 360°. Huss recommends that riders be a minimum of 120 cm (47 in) tall with an adult and over 140 cm (55 in) tall to ride alone on all models except for the Rodeo/Breakdance 4 variant; on this model riders must be at least 110 cm (43 in) tall.

Breakdances incorporate backdrops, and the provision for sound systems, elaborate light displays, and special effects equipment is made. Controls for these additional systems can easily be routed through the operator's console.

Traveling versions of this ride can be disassembled and stowed on two 12 m (39 ft) trailers, one for the ride itself, the other carrying the platforms, backdrop, special effects equipment and ticketbox.

== Variants ==
The success of the design has prompted HUSS to manufacture three additional variants to the Breakdance design. These are:

- Breakdance 2 - Six four-car hubs are installed on the 25-metre (82 ft) Octadecagon platform.
- Breakdance 3 - The dodecagonal platform is reduced to 18-metre (59 ft) in diameter, and the slope of the platform is changed, making the platform slightly cone-shaped. No backdrop is sold with this ride, which in combination with the size and slope reductions, significantly reduces the overall weight of the ride. The 8 ton difference makes this variant popular for transportable operations.
- Breakdance 4 - Also known as a Rodeo, this variant removes the platform entirely. Instead, three four-members of a "crew" are connected to the central dance by extended arms. There is no slope to the dance. It is much better suited for families than the other variants.
- Breakdance 5 - The decagonal main disc will be reduced to a diameter of less than 18-metre (59 ft). The ride will feature cross-shaped gyros with four gondolas that are capable of carrying two passengers.

Although officially a different ride and not a variant of Breakdance, after the success of Breakdance HUSS developed the Booster ride, which takes the idea a step further. It did not, however, gain the kind of success that Breakdance did.

=== Similar rides ===
Rides almost identical to the Breakdance have been produced by other companies. Below are listed the companies, with the ride name in brackets.

- Safeco (Blade Runner)
- Sobema (Break Dance)
- Fabbri Group (Crazy Dance)
- Top Fun (Magic Dance)
- Nauta Bussink (Star Dancer)
- Parkash (Break Dance)
- Funlight (Break Dance)

== Appearances ==
Over 110 Breakdance rides have been manufactured by HUSS, the vast majority of which are still in operation.

=== Transportable ===
Country	Number	Notes
Australia	4	3 manufactured by Sobema, 1 by Fabbri
Belgium	4	Deca Dance by HUSS, Crazy Dance by Sobema, Break Dance by HUSS, Grease (movie) built by Jabu Amusements
Germany	46	at least 46
Netherlands	5	plus 1 transportable Stardancer owned by Frank Vale, and one Break Dance owned by R. van der Wiel, built by ARM Rides
Portugal	1	the only transportable Huss Rodeo Breakdance (named Maxi Dance), originally built as a travelling prototype to visit tradefairs
United Kingdom	3	Ryan McCole (Safeco), Jonathan Hart (Stumpf & Partner [Hungary])
United States	4	All made by Fabbri

=== Theme parks ===
Country	Location	Ride name	Manufacturer	Model	Opened	Closed
Australia	Luna Park Sydney	Spider	HUSS Park Attractions	Breakdance 1	1995	2020
Austria	Wurstelprater	Laser Dance	HUSS Park Attractions	Breakdance 5	2024	
Belgium	Bellewaerde	El Toro	HUSS Park Attractions	Breakdance 3	2006	
Belgium	Bobbejaanland	Breakdance	HUSS Park Attractions	Breakdance 1	1987	2007
Belgium	Walibi Belgium	Spinning Vibe (formerly Cilindri Rotanti)	HUSS Park Attractions	Breakdance 3	2001	
Canada	Playland	Breakdance	HUSS Park Attractions	Breakdance 1	2005	
Canada	La Ronde	Disco Ronde	HUSS Park Attractions	Breakdance 1	1986	
Chile	Fantasilandia	Crazy Dance	Fabbri Group	Crazy Dance	1999	
China	Romon U-Park	Crazy Cap	HUSS Park Attractions	Breakdance 4 (Indoor)	2014	
Denmark	Tivoli Gardens	Snurretoppen	HUSS Park Attractions	Breakdance 1	1988	2017
Finland	Linnanmäki	Breakdance	HUSS Park Attractions	Breakdance 1	1988	2001
Germany	Heide Park	Woga Woga/Breakdance	HUSS Park Attractions	Breakdance 3	1991	
Germany	Serengeti Park	Breakdance	HUSS Park Attractions	Breakdance 3	1995	
Germany	CentrO Park	Rodeo	HUSS Park Attractions	Breakdance 4	2001	2010
Germany	Freizeit-Land Geiselwind	Piraten Schleuder (formerly Breakdance)	HUSS Park Attractions	Breakdance 3	1994	
Germany	Freizeitpark Plohn	Westernrodeo	HUSS Park Attractions	Breakdance 3	1996	
Germany	Holiday Park	Spinning Barrels	HUSS Park Attractions	Breakdance 4	2000	2014
Germany	Phantasialand	Crazy Loop	Fabbri Group	Crazy Dance (indoor)	1995	2004
Hungary	Vidám Park	Breakdance	HUSS Park Attractions	Breakdance 1	1993	2013
Israel	Luna Park	Breakdancer				
Japan	Toshimaen	Break Dance	HUSS Park Attractions	Breakdance 1	1987	2020
Korea	Everland	Championship Rodeo (formerly Breakdance)	HUSS Park Attractions	Breakdance 2	1991	
Kuwait	Hawally Park	Crazy Dance	Fabbri Group	Breakdance 1	2004	
Netherlands	Drouwenerzand	Break Dance	HUSS Park Attractions	Breakdance 1	2011	
Netherlands	Drievliet	Draaikolk	Nauta Bussink	Star Dancer	2011	
Netherlands	Walibi Holland	El Toro	HUSS Park Attractions	Breakdance 3	2000	2006
South Africa	Gold Reef City	Tornado (formerly The Old Mill)				
Spain	Parque Warner Madrid	Los Carros de la Mina (formerly Silver Mine Spinner)	HUSS Park Attractions	Breakdance 3	2002	
Spain	PortAventura Park	Crazy Barrels	HUSS Park Attractions	Breakdance 3	1995	
Sweden	Gröna Lund	Pop expressen	HUSS Park Attractions	Breakdance 3	1996	
Sweden	Öland Amusement Park	Break Dance	HUSS Park Attractions	Breakdance 1	2014	
Sweden	Skara Sommarland	Rodeo	HUSS Park Attractions	Breakdance 4	2011	2021
Sweden	Liseberg	Kraftverket	HUSS Park Attractions	Breakdance 5	2025	
United Kingdom	Lightwater Valley	Powder Kegs	HUSS Park Attractions	Breakdance 4	2011	
United Kingdom	Chessington World of Adventures	The Juggler/Rodeo	HUSS Park Attractions	Breakdance 1	1989	2004
United Kingdom	Alton Towers	Dynamo/Astro Dancer/Dino Dancer	HUSS Park Attractions	Breakdance 3	1993	2004
United Kingdom	South Pier	Break Dance	Sobema	Break Dance	1997	
United Kingdom	Pleasure Island Family Theme Park	Breakdance	HUSS Park Attractions	Break Dance	1994	2001
United Kingdom	Funland Hayling Island	Breakdance	I.E. Park	Breakdance	2003	2013
United Kingdom	Great Yarmouth Pleasure Beach	It's Bad	Sobema	Break Dance	1990	1995
United Kingdom	Barry Island Pleasure Park	Rhythm Dancer	William Thurston	Breakdance	1995	2006
United Kingdom	Ocean Beach, Rhyl	Tango Sensation	Sobema	Break Dance	1994	1996
United Kingdom	Loudoun Castle	Stormbreaker	HUSS Park Attractions	Breakdance 4	2008	2010
United Kingdom	M&D's	Street Dancer	Fabbri Group	Crazy Dance	1991	2002
United States	Six Flags America	Rodeo	HUSS Park Attractions	Breakdance 4	1999	2023
United States	Six Flags Great Adventure	Rodeo Stampede	HUSS Park Attractions	Breakdance 3	1999	2005
United States	Six Flags New England	Rodeo	HUSS Park Attractions	Breakdance 4	1998	2007
United States	Six Flags Over Texas	Rodeo	HUSS Park Attractions	Breakdance 3	2006	
United States	Astroland	Break Dance	HUSS Park Attractions	Breakdance 1	1988	2008
United States	Elitch Gardens	Paradise/Hollywood and Vine	HUSS Park Attractions	Breakdance 1	1987	
United States	Kentucky Kingdom	Breakdance	HUSS Park Attractions	Breakdance 3	1990	
United States	Santa Cruz Beach Boardwalk	WipeOut (formerly whirlwind)	HUSS Park Attractions	Breakdance 4 (Indoor)	2006	
United States	California's Great America	Peanuts Pirates/SpongeBob's Boat Mobiles	HUSS Park Attractions	Breakdance 4	2003	
United States	Morey's Piers	Break Dance	HUSS Park Attractions	Breakdance 1	1985	2005
