= Logger's Leap =

Closed Log Flume water ride

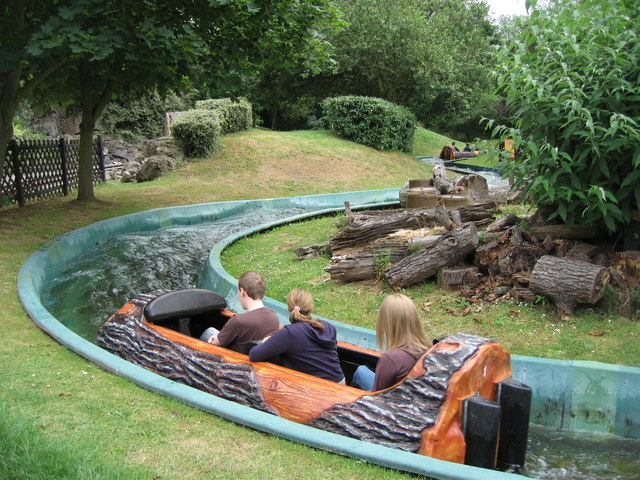
- A boat just after leaving the station

Thorpe Park
- Area: Canada Creek
- Coordinates: 51.402173°N 0.51297°W
- Status: Removed
- Opening date: 1989
- Closing date: 2015
- Replaced by: Hyperia

General statistics
- Type: Log flume
- Manufacturer: Mack Rides
- Lift system: Belt lift
- Boats: Riders are arranged in two rows (of 2 and 3 respectively) which totals 5 riders per boat.
- Height Restriction: 1m & 1 – 1.3m must be accompanied by an adult (18+)
- Virtual queue: Fastrack unavailable
- Wheelchair accessible

Logger’s Leap was a log flume water ride formerly located at Thorpe Park in Surrey, England. Upon its opening, it was promoted as the tallest log flume ride in the United Kingdom, featuring a large final drop that made it one of the park’s most prominent attractions. Logger’s Leap operated for several decades before permanently closing in 2015.

== History ==
Logger's Leap opened in 1989 on the lake at the back of the park, along with a new themed area 'Canada Creek'. It was manufactured by Mack Rides. The attraction featured a 'country and western' pop soundtrack including 5,6,7,8 by Steps, Cotton-Eyed Joe by Rednex, Southern Nights by Glen Campbell and 9 to 5 by Dolly Parton.

The ride was the tallest log flume ride in the UK upon opening, although this was surpassed by "Nightmare Niagara" at American Adventure theme park near Derby. Following the closure of American Adventure, Logger's Leap regained its record.

The ride famously featured in press photographs of the royal family with Princess Diana in 1993. A dedication plaque was erected next to the attraction following her death.

In 2013, the tunnel enclosing the first lift and drop was removed.

Following the 2015 operating season, Logger’s Leap did not reopen and remained non-operational. Thorpe Park later stated via social media that the attraction was “under redevelopment.” However, in February 2019, the park confirmed that Logger’s Leap had permanently closed, and announced that components of the ride were to be auctioned in May 2019. No such auction ultimately took place.

During Fright Nights 2019, the old station was used as the venue for a new scare maze attraction, "Creek Freak Massacre".

During the 2023 season, Loggers Leap was demolished to make way for Hyperia, the tallest, fastest, and most weightless roller coaster in the United Kingdom.

== Ride experience ==
Riders boarded the attraction from one of five loading queues situated at the front of the station. Each Logger’s Leap boat accommodated up to five passengers, with two seated at the front and three at the rear.

Upon leaving the station, the boat goes through a winding watercourse toward a covered tunnel, where it ascended a belt-driven lift before descending the first drop in complete darkness. Exiting the tunnel into a wooded area at the rear of the park, the ride crossed the main lake and approached the second belt lift hill. This section, the largest and most prominent element of the attraction, led to a steep double-dip drop and a substantial splashdown. The boat then travelled along a gentle return channel skirting the edge of the lake, before re-entering the station to conclude the ride.

== Post-closure redevelopments ==
Thorpe Park initially claimed via social media that they were "hoping for it to make a splashback soon". Since the official closure, however, Thorpe Park stated on their website in 2019 that "situations can change and as plans develop they often move in different directions". They followed by stating that "the area that Logger's Leap once dominated will be forming part of our long term development plans."

On 14 March 2022, Thorpe Park submitted an extensive planning application to Runnymede Borough Council detailing their proposed redevelopments of the Old Town area of the park. The main focus of the application is their proposed new roller coaster, at the time, code-named 'Project Exodus'. The demolition of Logger's Leap was completed in early 2023 to make way for the new roller coaster now known as Hyperia. Some sections of the flume still remain towards the back of the site.
