= Booster (HUSS ride) =

Amusement ride

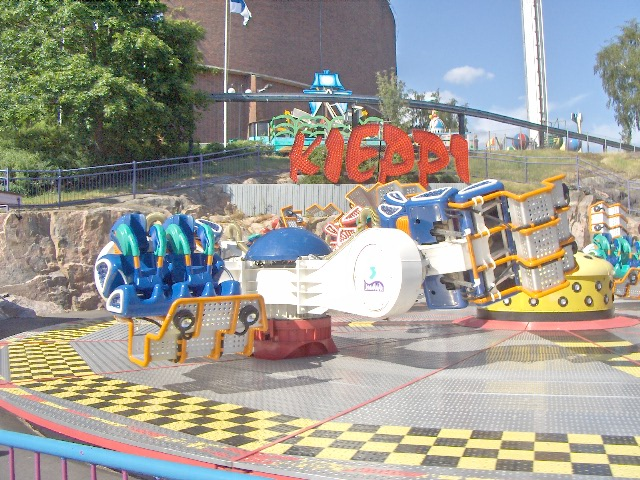
- HUSS Booster at Linnanmäki, Finland
- Status: In production
- First manufactured: 1998
- No. of installations: 3
- Manufacturer: HUSS Park Attractions

The Booster is an amusement park ride made originally by HUSS Maschinenfabrik starting in 1998.

Boosters are an evolution of HUSS' Breakdance ride, and are a competitor of Mondial's Shake and Fabbri's Crazy Shake rides. The basic movement is about the same as these rides, but the car is pivoted so that riders roll over sideways rather than flipped over. They are also known to turn upside down much more frequently than a traditional Shake ride. Most parks require riders to be at least 52 inches or taller.

Although Boosters are popular with riders and regarded as one of HUSS' best attractions by enthusiasts, very few of these rides have been sold. This can be attributed to it having a lower capacity compared to competing and or similar attractions, and with just as high running costs. Despite all this, the Booster is still being offered by HUSS Park Attractions.

Booster Revolution was announced in 2023, this new version has 40 seats instead of 32.

== Appearances ==
As of January 2018, only three of these rides are known to have been built, they are:

- Ghost Rider : A traveling model that currently attends various European funfairs with showman Löffelhardt. It was built in 1998 under the name Booster, and originally traveled with showman Rüdiger before being picked up by its current owner.
- Booster : Another traveling model that was built in 1999 under the name Ecstasy. The name was changed in 2000 and it traveled with showman Wingender in Germany until 2005, where it was then sold to a buyer in Asia.
- Kieppi : A park model that opened at the Linnanmäki park in Finland in 2003. The ride closed in 2016. It's now owned by Dirk Löffelhardt who also has the Ghost Rider. It will travel the funfairs again from summer 2019
