= Twinlakes Theme Park =

Theme park in Leicestershire, England

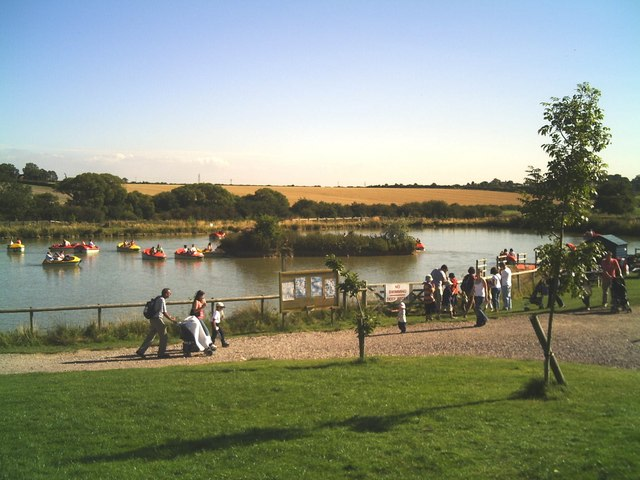
- Interactive map of Twinlakes Theme Park
- Location: Melton Mowbray, Leicestershire, England
- Coordinates: 52.7835°N 0.8582°W
- Opened: September 20, 2003
- Area: 70 acres (280,000 m^{2})

Attractions
- Roller coasters: 3
- Water rides: 4
- Website: Official website

Twinlakes is a theme park located 0.5 miles (0.75 kilometres) north-east of Melton Mowbray, Leicestershire, England.

The park was opened in September 2003, eleven months after the site was purchased. The 100-acre (400,000 m^{2}) park is family friendly with a large percentage of its rides being for young children, in comparison with other theme parks such as Alton Towers and Drayton Manor. Furthermore, groups of visitors with no children are not allowed access to the park.

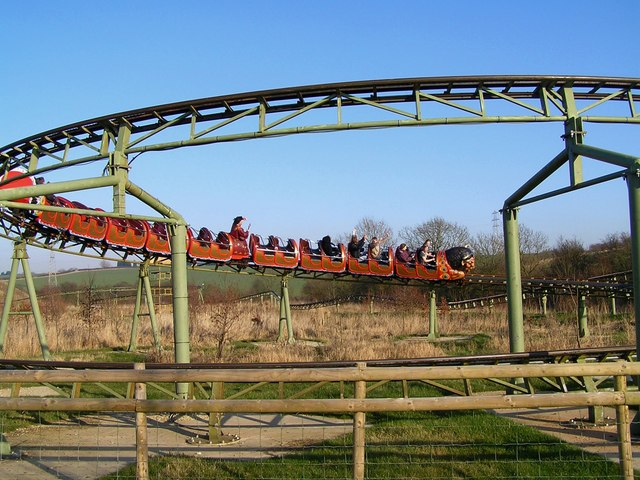
Roller coaster

Like many similar venues, Twinlakes is divided into geographic 'zones' to help visitors find their way around. However, unlike other places there seems to be little similarity between the individual attractions within each zone. Attractions at present include: small zoo, falconry centre, roller coaster, log flume, assault course, toboggan slide, go karts, "Excalibur" chair swing, "Icarus" sky flyer, Teacups, "Joust" horse ride, dragon themed toddler ride, "American Dream" model village, bumper boats, a boating lake and many more. A miniature railway with an oriental style transports visitors between various parts of the park.

Twinlakes is open every day of the year except for 25 and 26 December and 1 January. Group discounts and annual passes (which can also be used at the parks' sister venue Wheelgate Adventure Park near Mansfield) are available. The park’s advertising slogan is "Fantastic all weather family fun".
