= Fabbri =

Fabbri may refer to:

- Fabbri (surname), an Italian surname
- Fabbri Group, an Italian amusement rides manufacturer, based in Bergantino
- Fratelli Fabbri Editori, an Italian publishing house now part of Rcs MediaGroup
- Fabbri and Partners Ltd., an English publishing house
- Via Paolo Fabbri 43, an album by Francesco Guccini
- Fabbri, a locality (or frazione) of the commune of Montefalco, Perugia, Italy
