= Ocean Beach, Rhyl =

Former amusement park in Rhyl, Wales

Ocean Beach
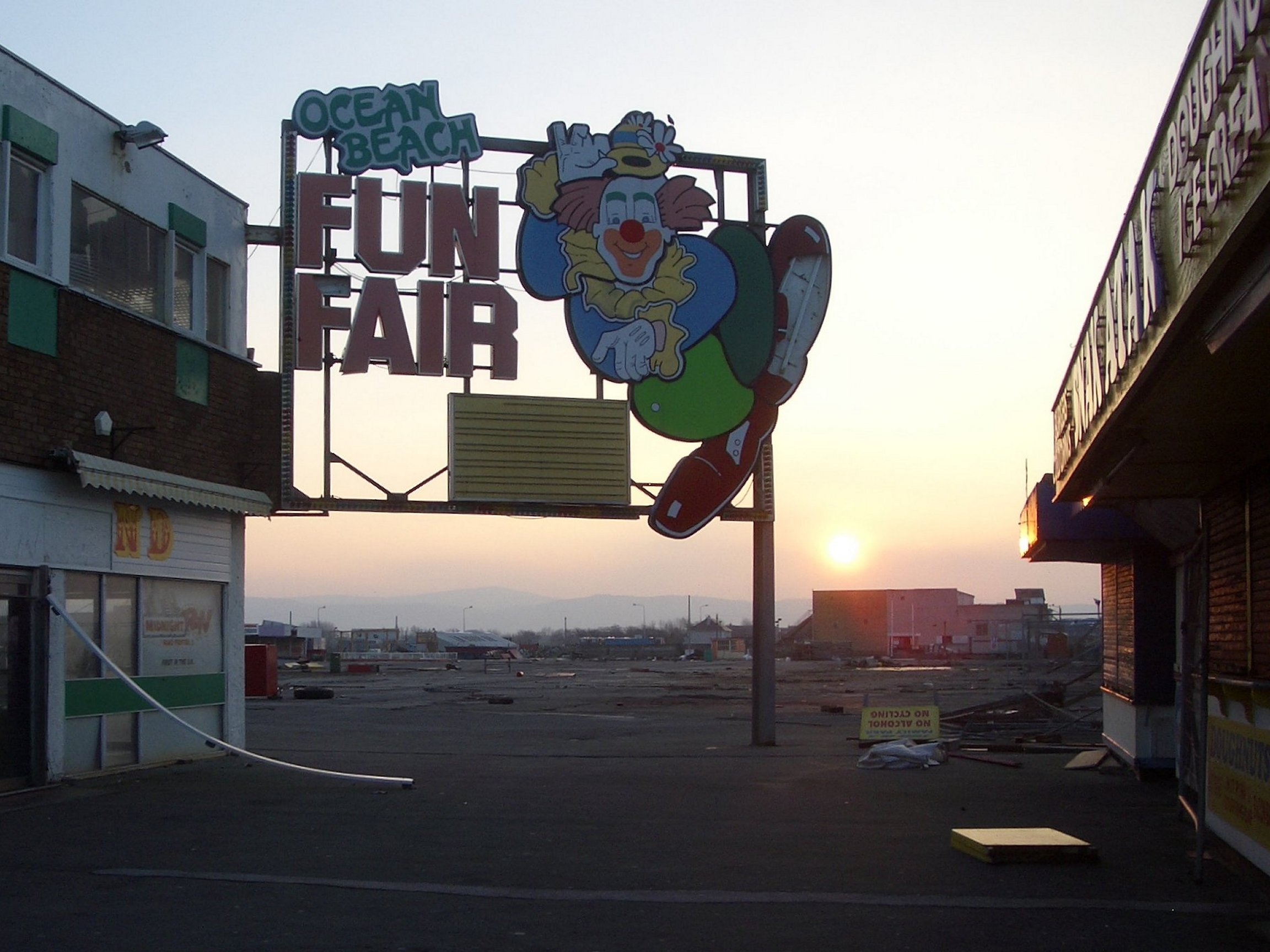
- The site of Ocean Beach in December 2007, three months after closure.
- Interactive map of Ocean Beach
- Location: Rhyl, Wales
- Coordinates: 53.31491°N 3.50516°W
- Opened: 1954
- Closed: 2 September 2007
- Owner: Rhyl Amusements
- Operating season: Easter to October

Attractions
- Roller coasters: 4
- Water rides: 1

Ocean Beach was an amusement park in Rhyl, North Wales which operated from 1954 until 2 September 2007.

== History ==
Rhyl began to take off as holiday resort following the opening of its railway station in 1848. The Ocean Beach funfair opened in the 1890s, growing into an amusement park at Marine Lake which was seeing thousands of visitors annually. It relocated in 1954 to larger premises at the West end of the promenade. The first British tubular steel rollercoaster was built at Ocean Beach.

== Demise ==
The town and the park declined in popularity since the 1960s and there had been very little investment in new rides or attractions in its final years. It closed for the final time on 2 September 2007. Plans to build a retail, leisure and housing complex on the site of the old Ocean Beach site, known as Ocean Plaza, was due to commence in May 2009 but were delayed and ultimately scrapped. As of 2015, plans for the site (now downsized and to be a retail-only park called Marina Quay) were approved, and stores began to open there in stages from 2017.

== Accidents ==
An accident on 31 July 2005 with five injuries, none serious, was reported as the "first accident in 40 years", suggesting the park had a very good safety record.

== Notable past rides ==
Opened	Closed	Ride Name	Manufacturer	Notes
1980	2007	"Jet Stream"	Pinfari	Z64 Rollercoaster. Previously operated at Battersea, London and Belle Vue, Manchester. Replaced earlier and smaller "Cyclone" Rollercoaster.
1975	1979	"Cyclone"	Pinfari	Z40 Rollercoaster.
1986	1988	"Looping Star"	Anton Schwarzkopf	Silverarrow Rollercoaster. Located on the car/coach park. Relocated to Camelot Theme Park as "Tower of Terror".
1989	2007	"Pepsi-Cola Loop"	Pinfari	ZL42 Rollercoaster.
1960	1975	"Big Dipper"		Former German travelling wooden side-friction rollercoaster.
1980	2006	"Runaway Train"	Schwarzkopf	Alpenblitz II Powered Rollercoaster.
1961	1974	"Mad Mouse"	Maxwell	Wooden wild mouse rollercoaster. Relocated to Wonderland, Cleethorpes
1990	2007	"Nessi"	Cavazza Diego	Super Nessi Junior Rollercoaster.
1972	2007	"Water Chute"	Leslie Joseph	Formerly operated at Kursaal Gardens, Southend from 1958 to 1971. It was the world's last surviving circular water chute.
1979	2007	"Dodgems"	Reverchon Industries	Replaced an older set of Dodgems.
1975	2007	"Waltzer"	Maxwell	Many other Waltzer rides operated on site previously. Damaged by fire c.1985 and rebuilt by H.P. Jackson.
1980	2007	"Star Wars"	Sobema	Swingaround ride, previously named "Thriller".
1980	2007	"Terminator"	Reverchon	A Matterhorn (ride).
c.1960	2007	"Ghost Train"		
1994	2007	"Sizzler"	P.W.S.	A Twist (ride). Previously operated at Central Pier, Blackpool.
1972	2007	"Giant Slide"	Ivan Bennett	Astroglide.
1980	2007	"Ski Jump"	Pollard	Flying Coaster ride.
1970s	2007	"Junior Gallopers"	H.P. Jackson	Junior set of Gallopers.
1959	c.2002	"Gallopers"	Savage	Previously operated at Marine Lake Amusement Park across the road.
1980s	2001	"Mystical Mine Ride"		A tracked Dark ride.
2001	2004	"Monster's Revenge"	Maxwell/Tivoli Enterprises	Owned by Tommy Boswell. A polyp ride, previously operated at Seaburn Amusement Park and Spanish City, Whitley Bay.
2000s	2004	"Barracuda"	A.R.M.	A Kamikaze (ride), owned by Tommy Boswell.
1994	1996	"Tango Sensation"	Sobema	A Breakdance (ride). Moved to South Pier, Blackpool, where it still operates.
1986	1993	"Octopus"	A.R.M.	A Polyp ride, moved to South Pier, Blackpool.
1986	1988	"Enterprise"	HUSS Park Attractions	An Enterprise (ride). Relocated to Pleasurewood Hills.
1975	1995	"L'amour Express"	Modern Products	A modern Caterpillar (ride). Replaced older version. Moved to Rainbow Park, Hunstanton.
1948	1974	"Caterpillar"		Traditional caterpillar ride, owned by Benny Sedgwick.
1986	1994	"Viking"	Helmut Hauser	A Pirate Ship (ride), relocated to South Pier, Blackpool.
1977	1987	"Orbiter"	Tivoli UK	Moved to Clarence Pier.
1975	1991	"Skydiver"	Ivan Bennett	A Lifting Paratrooper (ride), owned by Ronnie Weston.
1978	1983	"Meteorite"	Cadoxton Engineering	A Round Up (ride)
1955	1955	"Dive Bomber"	Lusse	Previously operated at Marine Lake Amusement Park, Rhyl.
1980	1983	"Tip Top"	Tivoli UK	A Tip Top/Force 10 ride.
1976	1987	"Easy Rider"	Maxwell	An Ark ride, Relocated to Ocean Beach, South Shields.
1960s	1970s	"Psycho"	Supercar	A multi-level ghost train.
1978	1993	"Cyclone Twist"	Pollard	A twist ride, replaced an older version. Owned by Ronnie Weston.
1964	1977	"Twist"	Ivan Bennett	A twist ride.
1950s	1979	"Rotor"	Orton & Spooner	Traditional large Rotor (ride).
1965	1965	"Satellite"	Ivan Bennett	The first of 3 Trabant rides to operate at the park.
1968	1977	"Satellite"	Ivan Bennett	The second of 3 Trabant rides to operate at the park.
1989	1989	"Satellite"	Ivan Bennett	The third of 3 Trabant rides to operate at the park.
1963	1974	"Waltzer"	H.P. Jackson	
1940s	1978	"Dodgems"	Lakin	Replaced by a modern Reverchon track. Owned by Webber Brothers.
1980	1983	"Rock-O-Plane"	Eyerley or Eli-Bridge	A Rock-O-Plane ride.
1980	1980s	"Cinema 180"	Omnivision	A 180-degree cinema.
1977	1977	"Scat"	Fairplace	A scat ride that operated for one season in 1977, and then another in 2001.
1956	1970s	"Austin Car Ride"	Supercar	A tracked children's ride.
1983	1980s	"Super Loop"	Larson International	An American Super Loop ride.
1995	1997	"Giant Wheel"	Helmut Hauser	A large ferris wheel, owned by Gore & DeKoning.
1993	1993	"Challenger"	ESL Engineering	A Voyager ride, owned by Ronnie Weston.
1950s	1962	"Speedway"	Supercar	A Monte Carlo Rally ride.
1990s	2007	"Tropical Dancer"		A small funhouse.
1960s	1970s	"American Coaster"	Ben Schiff	A small oval-shaped rollercoaster.
1950s	1970s	"Lighthouse Slip"		A traditional helter skelter slide.
1970s	2007	"Skyline Slip"		An updated helter skelter slide.
1959	1962	"Waltzer"	Maxwell	A Waltzer ride owned by E.L. Morley.
c.1952	1953	"Moon-Rocket"	Schippers	A German Moonrocket ride owned by Webber Brothers. Previously operated at Barry Island Pleasure Park under Albert Barton and John Collins.
1955	1959	"Stratocruisers"	R.J. Lakin & Maxwell	The park's second Moonrocket ride, owned by Webber Brothers. Later operated at Redcar Amusement Park and Clarence Pier.

== Video footage ==
Some video footage from the defunct rides does exist on YouTube

- Jetstream video
- Pepsi Cola Loop
- Log Ride
