= Cannonball Express (roller coaster) =

Roller coaster in England

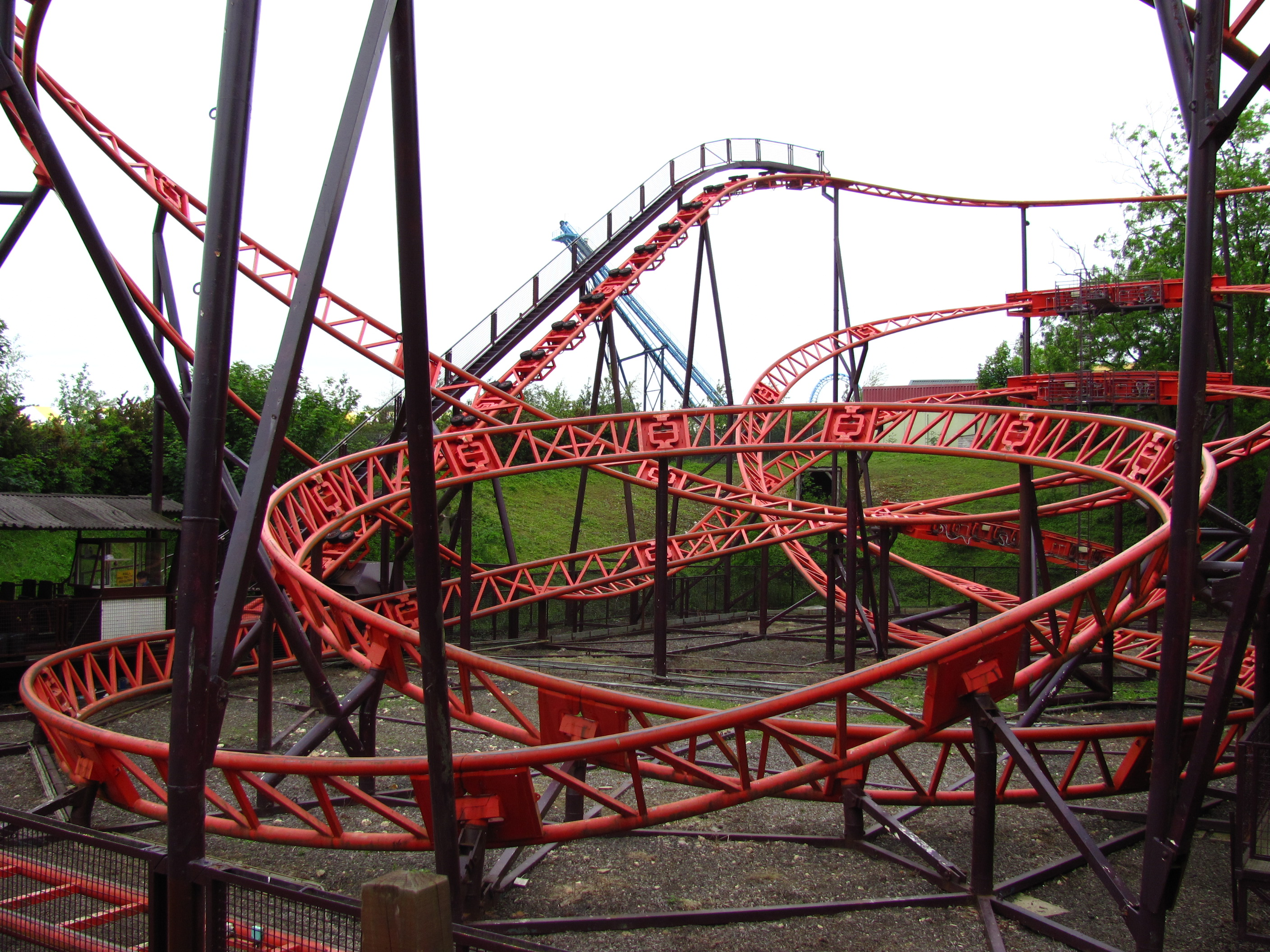

Pleasurewood Hills
- Location: Pleasurewood Hills
- Coordinates: 52.5062°N 1.7451°E
- Status: Operating
- Opening date: 1995

General statistics
- Type: Steel
- Manufacturer: Anton Schwarzkopf
- Designer: Werner Stengel
- Model: Jumbo V
- Lift/launch system: Tire lift hill
- Height: 53 ft (16 m)
- Length: 1,738 ft (530 m)
- Speed: 34 mph (55 km/h)
- Inversions: 0
- Duration: 2:00
- Capacity: 300 riders per hour
- Trains: 1 (formerly 4) trains with 2 cars; riders arranged 2 across in 2 rows for a total of 8 riders per train
- Cannonball Express at RCDB

Cannonball Express is a roller coaster located at Pleasurewood Hills, Corton, near Lowestoft, Suffolk. It is the only Schwarzkopf Jumbo V coaster to be manufactured.

== History ==
The ride was built in 1983 for a German travelling fair and briefly operated at Meli Park in Belgium as Jumbo 5. In 1985 it was relocated to Funland Park in Folkestone, Kent, where it was renamed Super Figure Eight. In 1995 it moved to Pleasurewood Hills as Cannonball Express, where it was mine train themed. In 2005 it was refurbished and renamed Enigma. In 2017 the name reverted to Cannonball Express.

As Cannonball Express, the ride originally had four trains coloured:

- Blue - Still in operation
- Purple - In storage (Used for maintenance)
- Green - In storage (put on track in 2009 for a short time)
- Red - Used the least, thought to be scrapped

There is now only 1 train in operation, which consists of 2 cars and seats only eight people, 4 per car. With separate on- and off-loading stations it means the ride has a very low capacity of around 160 people per hour.

The reason the other trains were retired was due to maintenance difficulties as the Schwarzkopf company, who manufactured the ride, stopped roller coaster production. The block brakes which allowed more than one train to run are now inoperative and the other trains have been cannibalised for parts.
