= HUSS Park Attractions =

German amusement ride manufacturer

Huss Park Attractions GmbH
- Company type: GmbH
- Industry: Manufacturing
- Founded: 2007
- Headquarters: Bremen, Germany
- Area served: Worldwide
- Key people: Mirko J. Schulze (Managing Director)
- Products: Amusement rides
- Website: www.hussrides.com

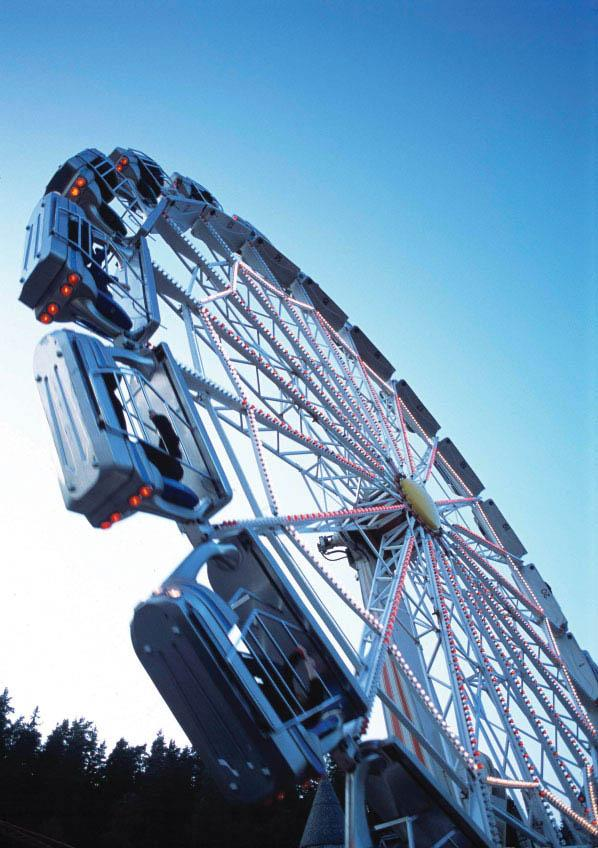
"Enterprise" at TusenFryd in 2005 (Norway). Opened 1988, closed 2006.

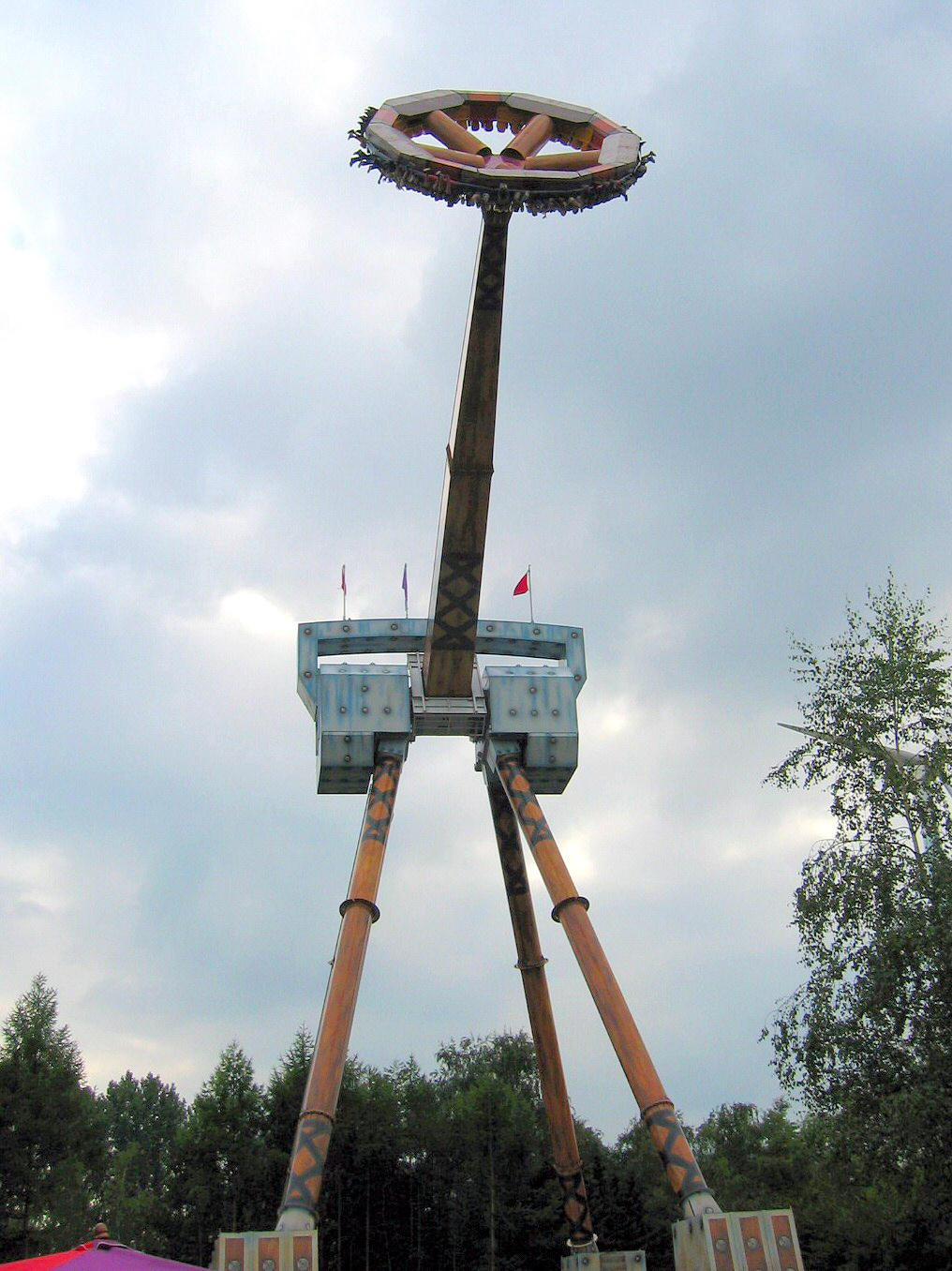
Sledgehammer, a HUSS Giant Frisbee at Bobbejaanland, Belgium

HUSS Park Attractions (legal name: Huss Park Attractions GmbH) is a German-owned company that specializes in developing and manufacturing amusement rides at a factory in Budapest, Hungary.

== History of the original Huss Company ==
HUSS Maschinenfabrik was a German company founded in 1919 in Bremen and originally made new and replacement parts for ship engines. The company began to create amusement rides in 1969 and continued until 2005.

In 1981, Huss Maschinenfabrik purchased Arrow Development from the Rio Grande Railroad, merging the two companies to form Arrow Huss. The company got into financial trouble partially due to heavily investing in Darien Lake theme park in New York and the 1984 Louisiana World Exposition in New Orleans. Arrow Huss filed for bankruptcy protection in 1985, and 13 of the company's American officers negotiated a buyout. In 1986, the takeover was approved by the courts, and the American company re-emerged as Arrow Dynamics. The German company reorganized as Huss Maschinenfabrik GmbH & Co. KG.

On 1 August 2006, the Bremen district court declared provisional insolvency and an insolvency manager was appointed. Following this, a new company was created, Huss Park Attractions. The new company was created by a group of investors who used the "Huss" name, created a logo similar to the original used by HUSS, and began building rides at the Hungarian factory 'Huss Gépgyár Kft'.

Huss Park Attractions and Huss Parts and Service are newer companies and not the HUSS company that became world-famous by building rides such as the Enterprise, Pirate, Troika, and others in the 1970s and '80s. HUSS Maschinenfabrik was the company responsible for these rides. The companies of today are not the legal successors of the original HUSS MASCHINENFABRIK company nor the builders of the innovative HUSS rides.

== Ride styles ==
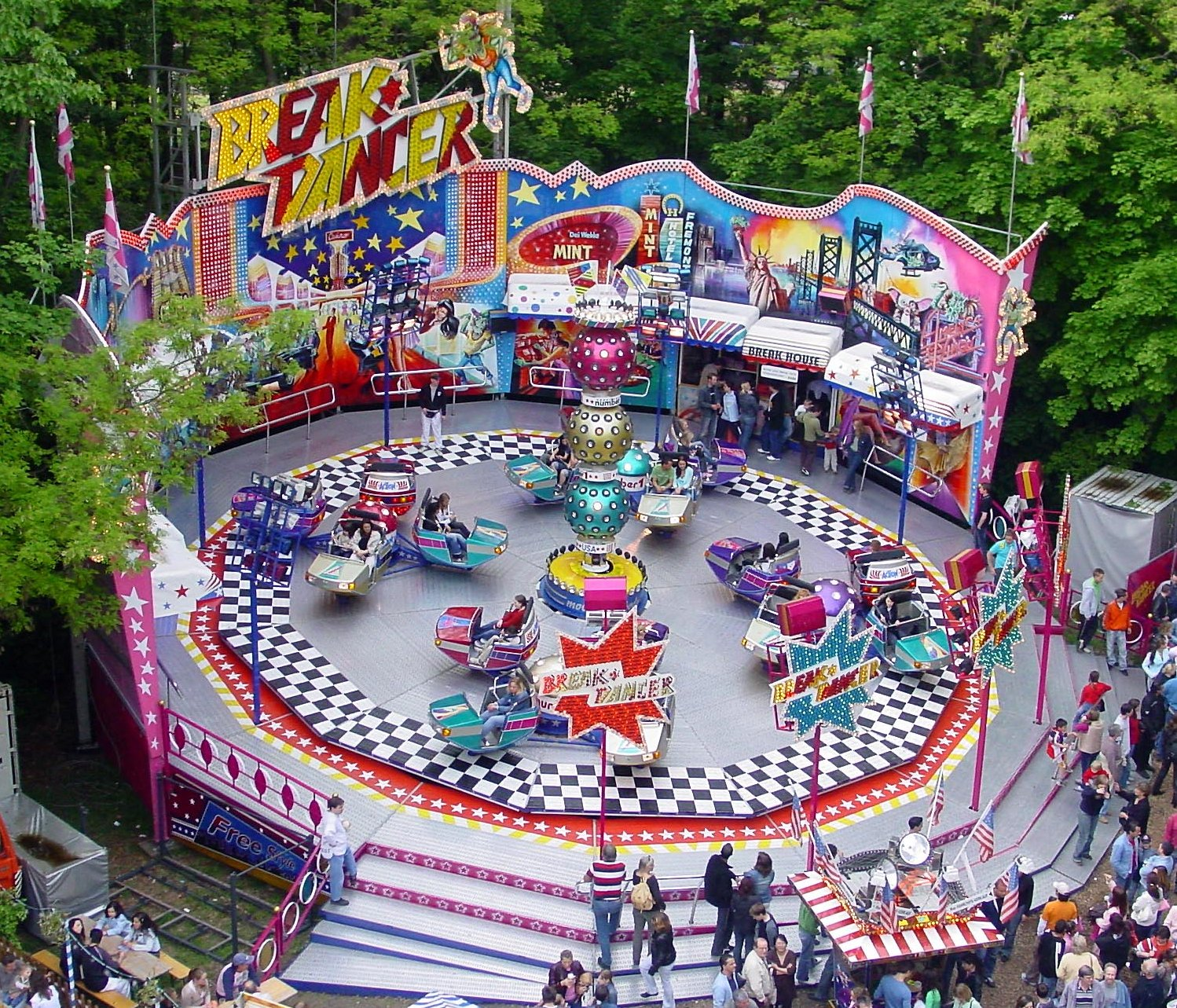
Breakdance, manufactured by Müller & Sohn Breakdancer oHG, Frankfurt

A few of HUSS' rides include the Breakdance, Top Spin, Shot'n Drop, and Frisbee. Breakdance was developed and built in 1985 by HUSS Rides and there are now four variants, of which over 100 have been installed worldwide—46 of them in Germany.

HUSS also offers a range of "Giant Rides" which are aimed to fill the gap between thrill rides and roller coasters. Arrow Huss built roller coasters from 1981 to 1985 during its merger with Arrow. Darien Lake's Viper, Marineland's Dragon Mountain, and Busch Gardens Williamsburg's Big Bad Wolf are a few examples.

=== List of HUSS-manufactured rides ===
Several companies using the HUSS name have produced and distributed over 30 unique ride designs. These rides are in operation all over the world, and some have been in operation for 35+ years. Below is a list of the different ride types produced by different HUSS companies:

ASR = Advanced System Rides

  - ASR Airboat
  - ASR Bee Bee
  - ASR Breakdance 4/Rodeo
  - ASR Crazy Pineapple (no longer available)
  - ASR Fly Willy
  - ASR Locomotion (no longer available)
- Ben Hur (no longer available)
- Booster
- Breakdance
  - Breakdance 1 (no longer available)
  - Breakdance 2 (no longer available)
  - Breakdance 3 (no longer available)
- Condor
  - (Reintroduced in 2013 as "Condor 2G/2GH")
- Delirium [Concept, never realized](no longer available)
- Disco-Round (no longer available)
- Enterprise
  - (Reintroduced in 2015 as "Enterprise 2G/2GH")
- Dream Boat (no longer available)
- Flic Flac (no longer available)
- Flipper (no longer available)
- Fly Away (no longer available)
- Flying Theatre
- Frisbee (no longer available)
  - Frisbee 34 (no longer available)
  - Giant Frisbee 40
  - Giant Frisbee 50
  - Frisbee XL (no longer available)
- Jump (no longer available)
  - Jump2
- King Kong
- Land of the Giants (concept, never realized; no longer available)
- Magic (no longer available)
- Megadance (no longer available)
- Pirate Ship
- Rainbow (no longer available)
- Ranger (no longer available)
- Skylab (no longer available)
- Shot'N Drop
- Shot'N Drop MAXI
- Sky Tower
- Speedy (no longer available)
- Swing Around (no longer available)
- Super Rutsche / Super Shute (no longer available)
- Top Spin Classic
- Top Spin 2 (no longer available)
- Top Spin Suspended
- Giant Top Spin (no longer available)
- Take Off (no longer available)
- Topple Tower
- Tri-Star (no longer available)
- Troika (no longer available)
- UFO (no longer available)

Before Huss Maschinenfabrik GMBH & KO went bankrupt they also acquired the building rights of two rides from the bankrupt Weber Maschinenbau GMBH also located in Bremen Germany.

- 1001 Nacht (no longer available)
- Traumboot (no longer available)
