= Mirabilandia (Olinda, Brazil) =

Amusement park in Olinda, Brazil

- Previously known as Playcenter Pernambuco (1994-2001)
- Interactive map of Mirabilandia
- Location: Olinda, Pernambuco, Brazil
- Coordinates: 8.032921°S 34.87398°W
- Opened: 1994
- Closed: February 2, 2025
- Owner: Peixoto Group
- Slogan: "Sua vida mais divertida", in English: "Your life with more fun"
- Operating season: June to January annually.
- Area: 57,000 m^{2} (610,000 sq ft)

Attractions
- Total: 30
- Roller coasters: 4
- Water rides: 1
- Website: www.mirabilandia.com.br

Mirabilandia was an amusement park in north-eastern Brazil. It was located in Olinda, and occupied 57,000 m^{2} of land. Mirabilandia operated three traveling parks in Brazil, called Universal Park, Fiesta Park and American Park.

In 2023, a teacher was seriously injured after being thrown from a swing ride at Mirabilandia. She later died in hospital. The park ceased operations on February 2, 2025. The park was growing out their location and they had plans to relocate to a new location in Paulista, which would also include the addition of a relocated Intamin 8-Inversion roller coaster from Terra Encantada and a relocated Vekoma Giant Inverted Boomerang from Six Flags Over Georgia. However, after the incident, the plans were ceased and the rides were put up for sale.
