= SW7 =

SW7 may refer to:

- EMD SW7, an American locomotive from 1949
- London SW7, a South Western postcode district in London
  - South Kensington, a district in London
- The Smiler, a British roller coaster codenamed Secret Weapon 7
- Star Wars: The Force Awakens, a 2015 film also known as Star Wars Episode VII
- Tongkang LRT station, a rail station in Singapore
