= Mirabilandia =

Mirabilandia may refer to:

- Mirabilandia (Olinda, Brazil), an amusement park at Olinda, Pernambuco, Brazil
- Mirabilandia (Paulista, Brazil), an amusement park at Paulista, Pernambuco, Brazil
- Mirabilandia (Italy), an amusement park at Savio, Emilia-Romagna, Italy
- Mirabilandia Beach, a 10 hectare Water park site, adjunct to the Italian Mirabilandia amusement park
