= Monte Makaya =

Amusement ride in Brazil

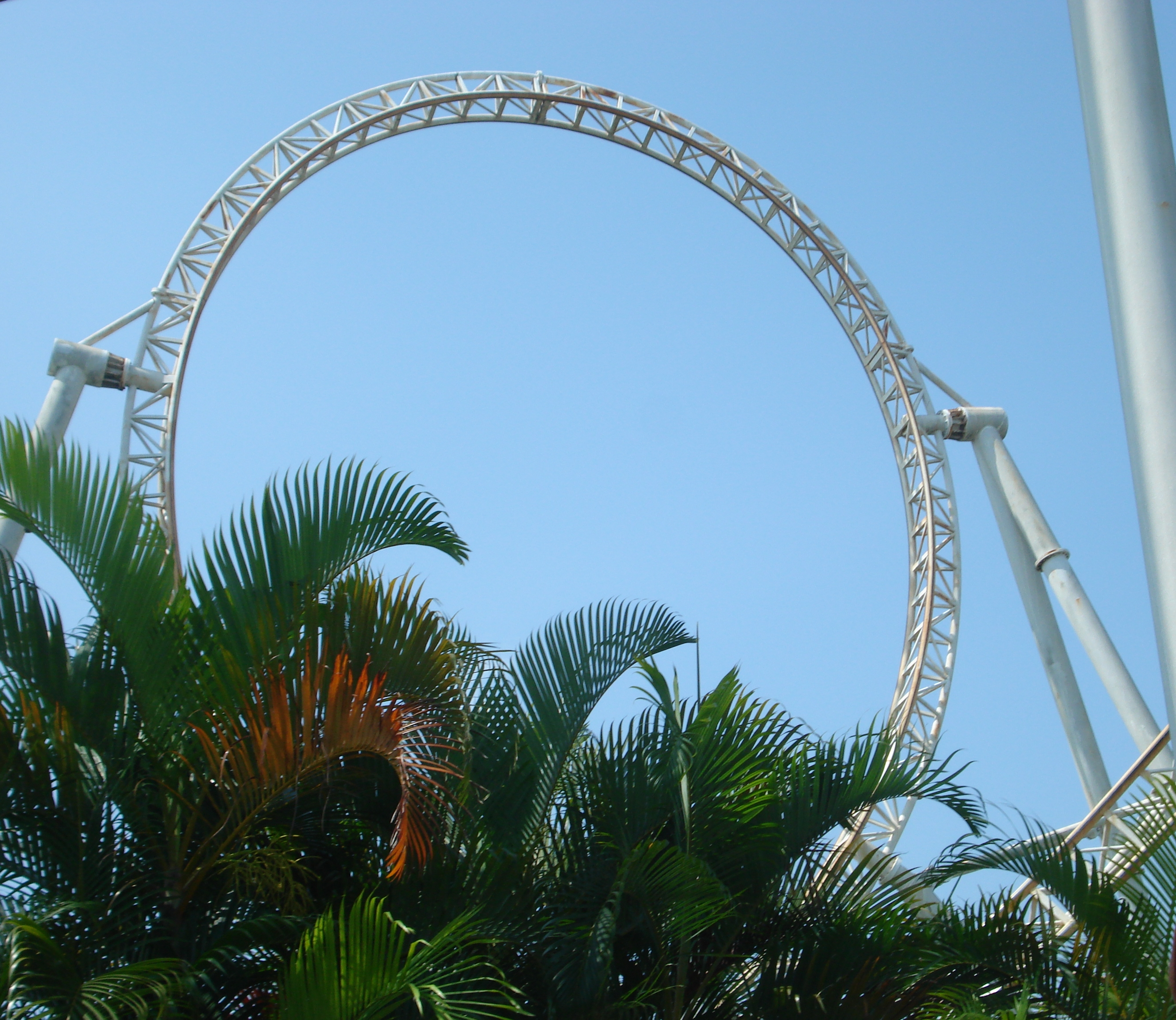

Terra Encantada
- Location: Terra Encantada
- Park section: Terra Africana
- Coordinates: 22.985274°S 43.364421°W
- Status: Removed
- Opening date: January 16, 1998
- Closing date: June 2010

General statistics
- Type: Steel
- Manufacturer: Intamin
- Designer: Werner Stengel
- Model: Multi Inversion Coaster (8 Inversion)
- Lift/launch system: Chain lift
- Height: 121.4 ft (37.0 m)
- Length: 2,624.7 ft (800.0 m)
- Speed: 49.7 mph (80.0 km/h)
- Inversions: 8
- Duration: 1:45
- Capacity: 1500 riders per hour
- Height restriction: 51 in (130 cm)
- Monte Makaya at RCDB

Monte Makaya was a steel, looping roller coaster manufactured by Intamin and located at Terra Encantada in Rio de Janeiro, Brazil. When it opened in 1998, Monte Makaya's eight inversions tied the world record previously set by Dragon Khan. It was located in the Terra Africana section near the rear of Terra Encantada in the northwest corner prior to the park's closure. Its location was in the newly relocated Mirabilandia amusement park under construction in Paulista, Pernambuco, Brazil from 2017 to 2024, when the project was canceled. The park put all of their rides on sale, except for Makaya. Makaya’s whereabouts are unknown.

== Layout ==
After ascending the 121-foot lift hill, the train turned 180 degrees and crested the first drop, which was directly followed by a vertical loop. Coming out of the loop, the train passed over a small airtime hill next to the station and then navigated a cobra roll. The fourth and fifth inversions, two consecutive corkscrews, followed after the train exited the cobra roll. After another turnaround, the train passed through a triple heartline roll (three consecutive heartline rolls), a downward helix, and a short banked hill, which turned them around one last time before the final brake run.

Although Monte Makaya had eight inversions, its layout was still short, nearly 1500 feet more so than Dragon Khan, another coaster with eight inversions.

== Similar coasters ==
Monte Makaya has paved the way for similar coasters around the world. Monte Makaya was Intamin's first roller coaster with eight or more inversions; since its opening, Intamin has built two clones of Monte Makaya (in Guatemala and China) and two ten-inversion coasters which have a similar layout to Monte Makaya. In 2013, the first "Revision B" of their 10 inversion model opened in China, featuring the same basic layout with a different first drop and more modern rolling stock. Four additional "Revision B" models have been built. In 2002, the first clone of Monte Makaya, Avalancha at Xetulul, and the world's first ten-looper, Colossus at Thorpe Park, opened. In 2006, exact replicas of Monte Makaya (Flight of the Phoenix at Phoenix Mountain's Happy Park) and Colossus (Tenth Ring Roller Coaster at Chimelong Paradise) opened at parks in China.

The ten-inversion coasters differ from Monte Makaya in that they feature two more inversions instead of a helix and a final banked hill. Instead, they pass riders through four consecutive heartline rolls, followed by a banked turn to the left and one more heartline roll, which ends just before the brake run.
