= Terra Encantada =

Amusement park in Rio de Janeiro, Brazil

- Interactive map of Terra Encantada
- Location: Rio de Janeiro, Brazil
- Coordinates: 22.986606°S 43.363233°W
- Opened: January 15, 1998
- Closed: June 19, 2010
- Theme: Brazil
- Area: 200 sq. kilometers

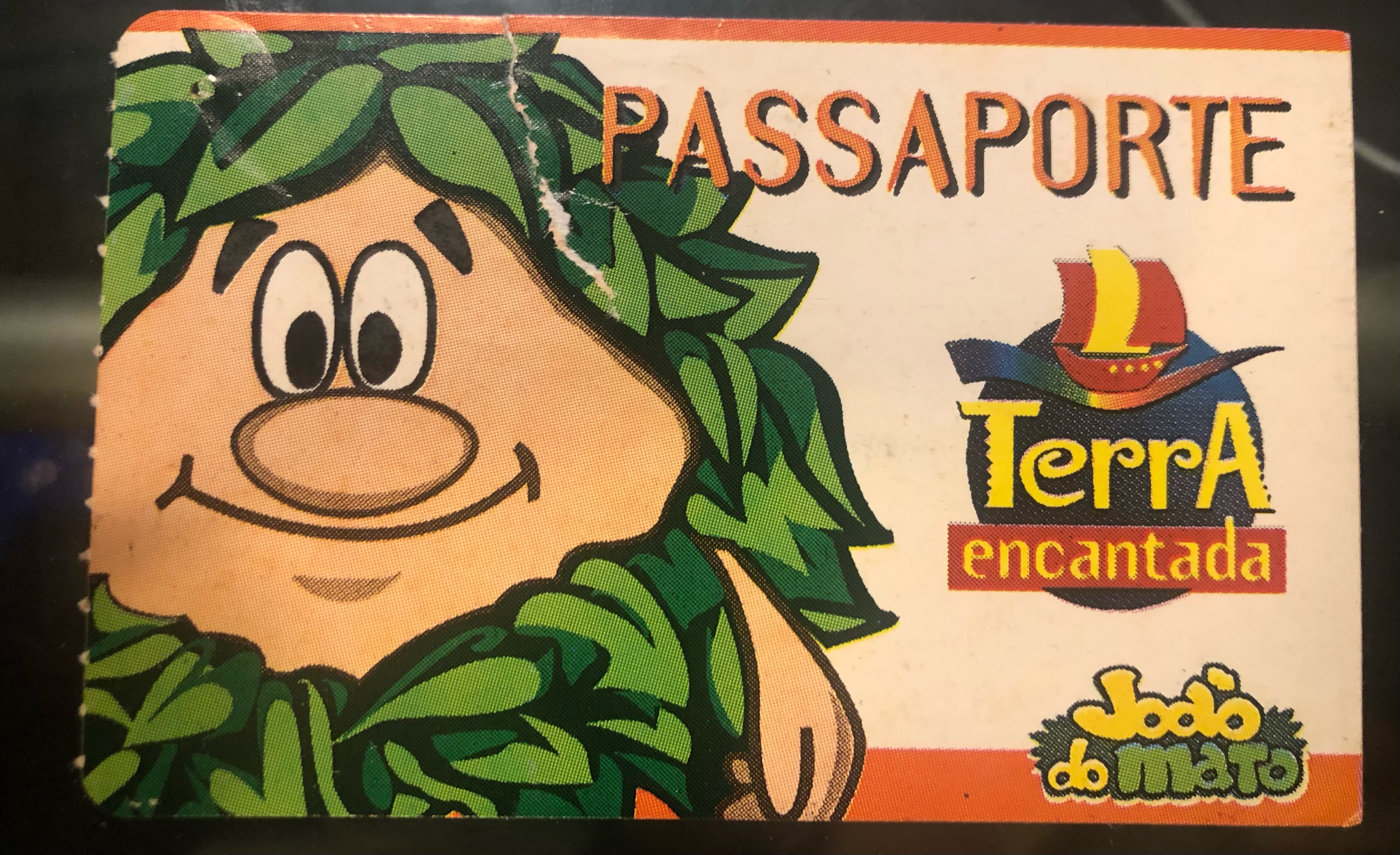
Ticket For Terra Encantada

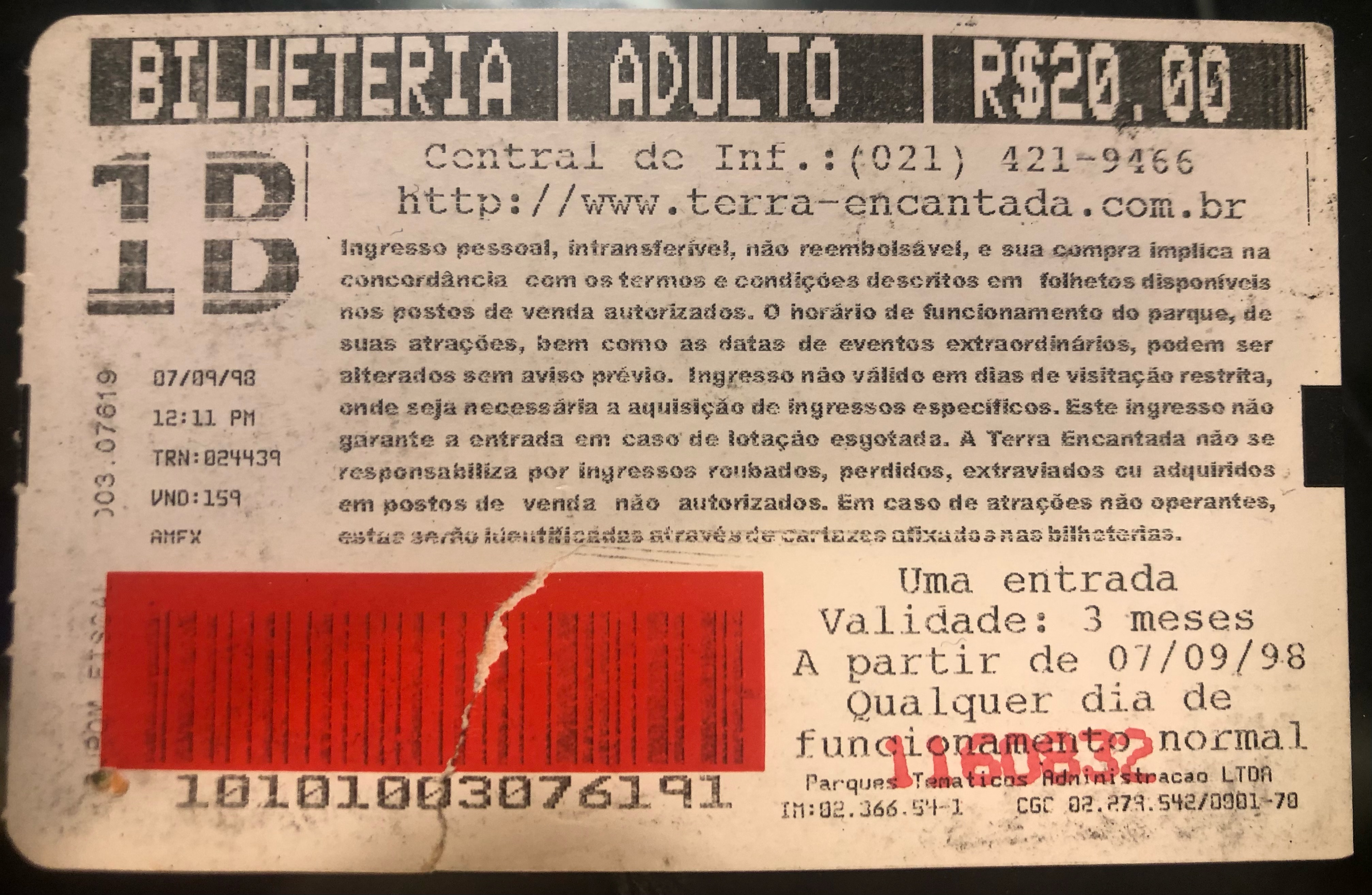
The Back of the Ticket for Entrance into Terra Encantada

Terra Encantada was an amusement park in Barra da Tijuca, Rio de Janeiro, Brazil, It operated from 1998 to 2010. The park, which spanned over an area of 200 square kilometers, was dedicated to the celebration of Brazilian culture and its diverse origins, including indigenous, African, and European influences.

== History ==
The park was planned to have more than 60 dining options, including a Planet Hollywood location. Investments reached US$220 million and the park received funding from the National Bank for Economic Development. Over 12 thousand people were expected to be employed directly and indirectly, with as many as 20,000 estimated visitors per day. Revenue was forecasted to be about $30 million monthly.

The park's opening was delayed twice, from its original date on October 12, 1997, to December 15 and eventually to January 15, 1998. Upon its opening, not all of the attractions were open. The first visitors, disappointed, demanded refunds. While at the park's opening party, actress Isis de Oliveira was injured at one of the main attractions of the park. She subsequently sued the park for damages. Other disturbances included fights between jiu-jitsu entertainers and a strike by employees.

On March 17, 2002, during a party at the park for freshmen at the Estácio de Sá University, a brawl erupted during a performance by rock band Charlie Brown Jr. The brawl started after the singer left the stage, and the park asked the band to continue playing in hopes of mitigating damage. 61 people were injured, shops were destroyed and looted, and stones, chairs, trash cans, and potted plants were thrown everywhere.

In 2005, a 28-year-old man fell from one of the roller coasters, suffering lung perforation and fractures in his skull and cervical spine.

In 2009, the Public Ministry opened an investigation into the park after receiving a complaint about its unsafe condition. However, little action was taken beyond an initial investigation and a report. Another complaint was made in 2009 after employees continued to sell tickets to visitors during a power outage despite the rides and attractions not functioning.

That same year, the park was chosen to be the filming location for the soap opera "Bela, a Feia ", and all of Main Street was changed to resemble the old Rio de Janeiro neighborhood of Gamboa. The location was leased until July 2010.

On June 19, 2010, 61-year-old visitor Heydiara Lemos Ribeiro was thrown from Mount Aurora and died from head trauma. The park continued to operate for several more months while investigations were carried out. The subsequent investigations discovered that the park's rides all had serious structural and mechanical issues, which led to a complete closedown of the park. The park's director and engineers were charged with manslaughter in 2011, although they would be acquitted of this charge in 2013. The park would only be able to reopen when the demands made by the Civil Defense were fulfilled.

The park closed in 2010. There was a fire on the property in 2014, in a building used for movie screenings. Demolition of the site began in 2016.

== Characters ==
The main character was Kiara, queen of the park, who was a water goddess inspired by the mythological figures of tiaras and kittens. Tunhã was a golden lion tamarin and Aurora was a Spix's macaw. The character João do Mato prevented deforestation.

== Thematic areas ==
Terra Encantada was divided into different thematic areas that depicted the origins of the Brazilian people.

=== Main Street ===
The main street contained bars, restaurants, and most of the shops in the park, all with facades in various styles of Brazilian architecture.

==== Attractions ====
- Portal das Trevas, a ghost maze where not touch the monsters, or they will touch you.
- Cine 3D, feel in a movie with amazing 3D effects.

==== Trivia ====
- Cine IMAX, IMAX Cinema was the first film of its kind in Brazil. The KODAK company sent the wrong tape, but when he learned of the crisis of the park they did not send the correct tape. The space is completed but does not work today.

=== Terra Européia (Europe Land) ===
Inspired by European culture.

The area included a small Zamperia roller coaster.

==== Attractions ====
- Cabhum, this tower of 67 meters, which equates to a building of 22 floors, offers participants the experience of a free fall at 100 km per hour. Similar to The Twilight Zone - Tower of Terror at Disney's Hollywood Studios. Manufactured by Intamin.
- Chega Mais, a modern version of "silkworm", brings together music and speed on trails, in addition to rotating forward and backward.
- Tornado, a flying carousel popularly known as "Mexican hat". Gives a feeling of flying and has a view of the entire park.

=== Terra das Crianças (Children's Land) ===
Children's Land had a teacup ride (with water lilies instead of tea cups), a carousel, and a mini roller coaster manufactured by Zamperia. Also present were an ecological-themed playground, a kart racing track, and a house of mirrors.

==== Attractions ====
- Trem Fantasma is a scary ghost train where all the dead come to life.
- Teco-Teco, authentic reproductions of biplanes. The attraction can fly up and down, which is controlled by whoever is inside the plane.

=== Terra dos Índios (Land of the Indians) ===
Honoring the indigenous peoples of Brazil.

==== Attraction ====
- Corredeiras, a large channel 600 meters in length where a passenger boat with 9 wins the rapids of a wild river. Similar to the Congo River from Busch Gardens, Florida / USA. Manufactured by Intamin.

=== Terra Africana (African Land) ===
The objective of the creation of this thematic area is to show how African culture influenced the formation of the Brazilian people. The main roller coaster in the park, Monte Makaya, was located in this area. It held the record for most inversions in the world (8) for four years, before it was surpassed by Colossus at Thorpe Park.

The area also included bumper cars and a caravel ride.

==== Castelo das Águas (The Water Castle) ====
With plans to open in 1999, the Castle of Waters would have a surprise inside, a roller coaster in the dark. Unfortunately, these projects were discontinued. The roller coaster was relocated to Europe Land as Monte Aurora.

=== Food ===
Terra Encantada had three primary dining options:

- Filé Miau, a cafeteria located in the European Land
- Looping Kids, a cafeteria located at the exit of Monte Makaya
- Nippon Box, a cafeteria located on Earth African

== Music ==
The park had a musical trio, also called Terra Encantada, which performed songs to promote the park.
