= Dragon Khan =

Rollercoaster in Spain

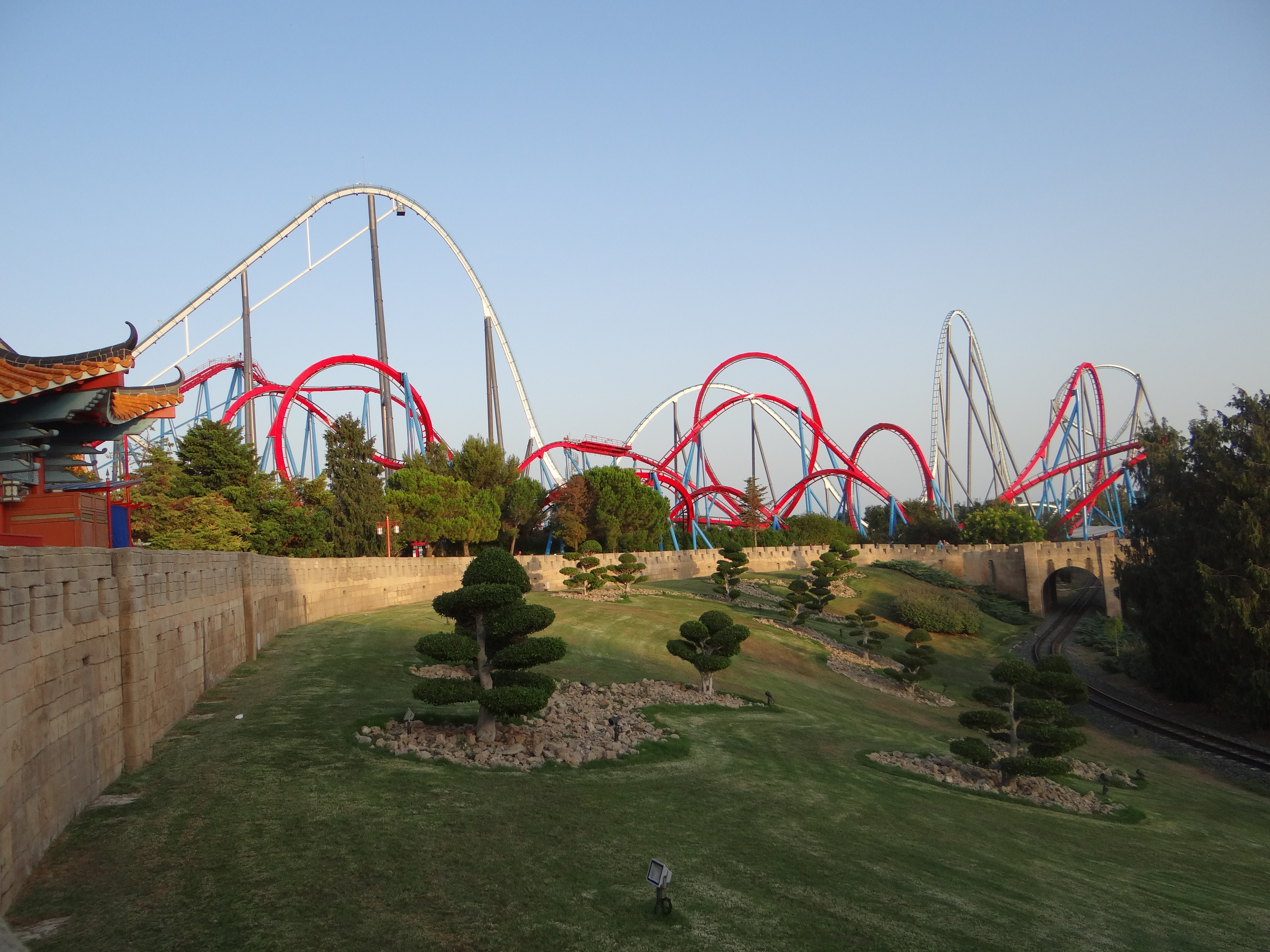
- Dragon Khan's (red) layout under Shambhala (white)

PortAventura Park
- Location: PortAventura Park
- Park section: China
- Coordinates: 41°05′15″N 1°09′39″E
- Status: Operating
- Opening date: 2 May 1995

General statistics
- Type: Steel
- Manufacturer: Bolliger & Mabillard
- Designer: Werner Stengel
- Model: Sitting Coaster
- Lift/launch system: Chain lift hill
- Height: 45.1 m (148 ft)
- Drop: 49.1 m (161 ft)
- Length: 1,269 m (4,163 ft)
- Speed: 104.6 km/h (65.0 mph)
- Inversions: 8
- Duration: 1:45
- Height restriction: 140–195 cm (4 ft 7 in – 6 ft 5 in)
- Trains: 3 trains with 7 cars; riders arranged 4 across in a single row for a total of 28 riders per train
- Dragon Khan at RCDB

Dragon Khan is a steel sit-down roller coaster in the PortAventura Park theme park in Salou and Vilaseca (Tarragona), Catalonia, Spain. It has eight inversions, which was a world record until the opening of the ten-inversion Colossus in Thorpe Park, United Kingdom in 2002.

The ride, built by Bolliger & Mabillard (B&M), opened on May 2, 1995 and was one of the two roller coasters present on PortAventura's opening. The track is red with white and pastel blue supports; the trains are green, blue and purple (a third train is run at peak times only); the restraints are yellow.

== Ride experience ==
=== Inversions ===
| | Inversions |
|---|---|
| 1 | Vertical loop |
| 2 | Dive loop |
| 3 | Zero-g roll |
| 4 | Cobra roll |
| 5 | Cobra roll |
| 6 | Vertical loop |
| 7 | Interlocking corkscrews |
| 8 | Interlocking corkscrews |

=== The ride ===
After boarding the ride, riders climb to the top of the lift hill 45 m (148 ft), crossing under one of Shambhala's return airtime hills. At the crest of the lift hill, Dragon Khan's track crosses under Shambhala's lift hill and hits a pre-drop. The track makes a right hand turn, then immediately dives down the first drop, threading under Shambhala's first drop and over its splashdown, and entering a 36 metres (118 ft) vertical loop. This is immediately followed by a dive loop. Right after this, the track goes through a zero-g roll which threads through the second vertical loop, and a cobra roll. The track then rises up into the midcourse brake run. Off the midcourse brake run, the track makes a near-miss with Shambhala's first drop as it drops to the right, crossing under the exit from the first loop, and into a second vertical loop which wraps around the zero g roll. Leaving the second loop, the track passes goes through a 270 degree counterclockwise upward helix, before entering a set of interlocking corkscrews. The ride then makes a left turn into the final brake run, passing under the center point in the cobra roll, before re-entering the Chinese-themed station. The track is 1,285 m (4,216 ft), and the ride's top speed is over 104 km/h (65 mph). The ride's duration is 1 minute and 45 seconds. The ride, thus far, has more inversions than any other B&M coaster made before or after.

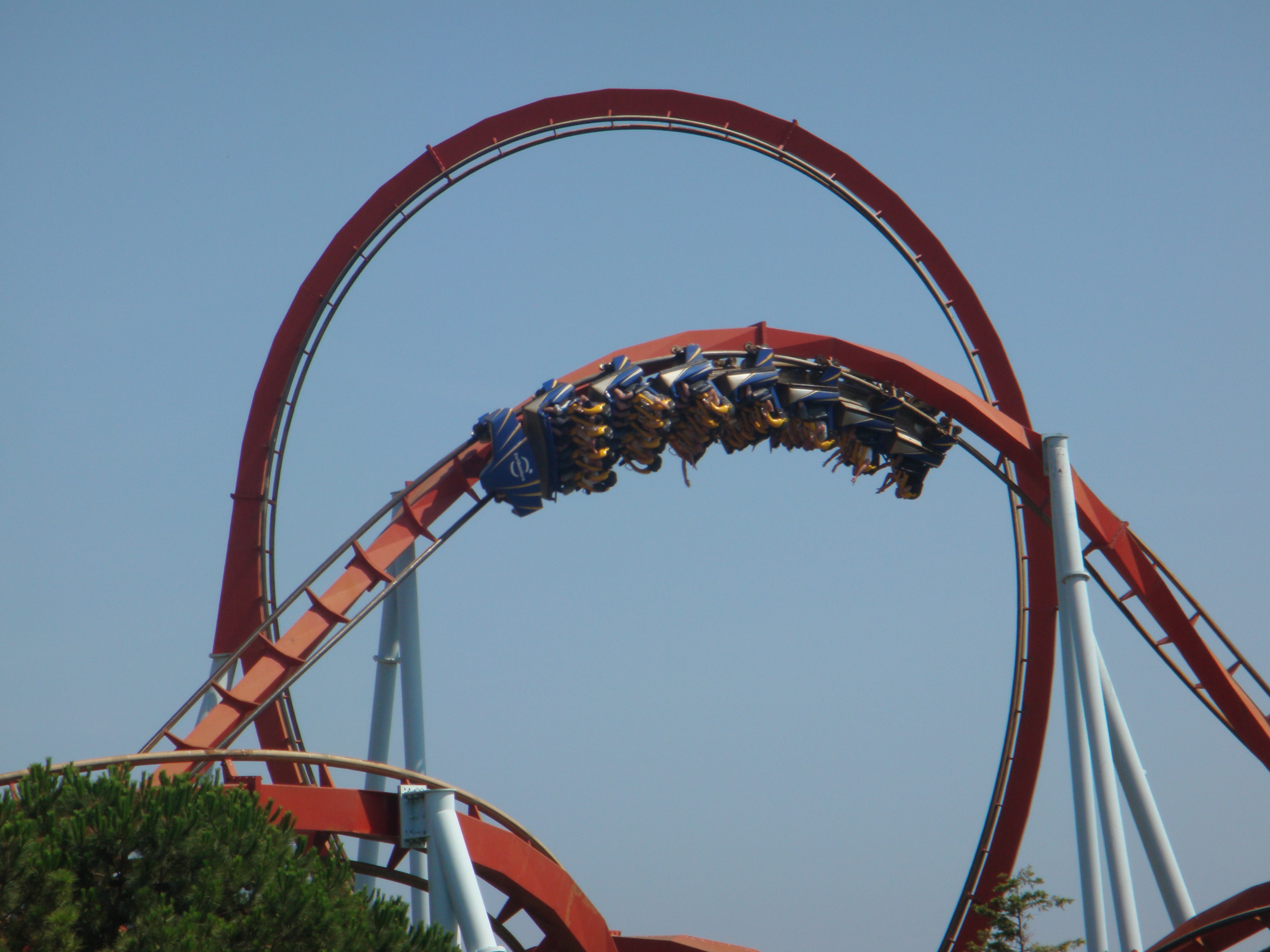
Dragon Khan's zero-g roll

The ride has a total of three trains, each containing seven cars. Riders are arranged four across in a single row for a total of 28 riders per train.

The theme for this ride is based on Chinese mythology: the dragon Khan was the reincarnated spirit of the evil Prince Hu of Beijing. His fury was unleashed each time a human dared to climb atop his back. This links in with the fact that the ride is located at the very back of the park in the Chinese themed area. Due to this ride's placement, it can be seen from anywhere inside the park, as well as from nearby hotels and the Reus airport.

| Preceded by Kumba | World's Tallest Vertical Loop; May 1995–May 1996 | Succeeded by Mantis |
| Preceded by Shockwave | Most Inversions on a Roller Coaster; May 1995–March 2002 | Succeeded by Colossus |
