= 10 Inversion Roller Coaster =

Steel roller coaster

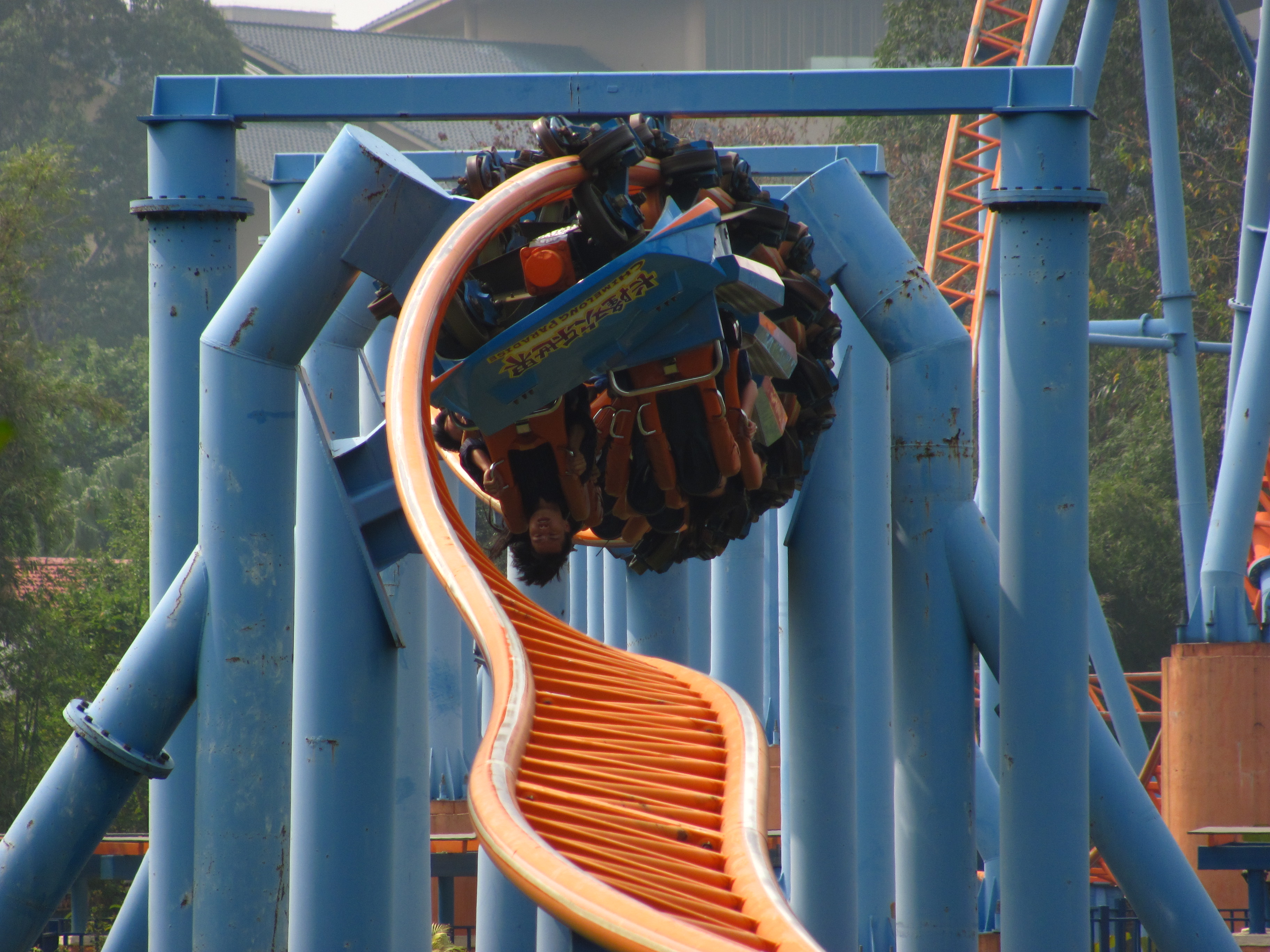
- 10 inversion Roller Coaster's Heartline Rolls

Chimelong Paradise
- Location: Chimelong Paradise
- Park section: Screaming Zone
- Coordinates: 23.004355°N 113.326913°E
- Status: Removed
- Opening date: February 2006
- Closing date: December 7, 2025

General statistics
- Type: Steel
- Manufacturer: Intamin
- Designer: Werner Stengel
- Model: Multi Inversion Coaster
- Track layout: 10 Inversion Revision A
- Lift/launch system: Chain lift hill
- Height: 98.4 ft (30.0 m)
- Length: 2,788.8 ft (850.0 m)
- Speed: 45 mph (72 km/h)
- Inversions: 10
- Duration: 1:32
- Capacity: 1,340 riders per hour
- Height restriction: 54–77 in (137–196 cm)
- Trains: Single train with 7 cars; riders arranged 2 across in 2 rows for a total of 28 riders per train
- 10 Inversion Roller Coaster at RCDB

10 Inversion Roller Coaster was a steel roller coaster at Chimelong Paradise amusement park in Guangzhou, Guangdong China. Completed in 2006, 10 Inversion Roller Coaster was the second roller coaster in the world with ten inversions, after Colossus at Thorpe Park, of which it is an exact replica. The ride permanently closed in December 2025, and was sold to a park in India as of 2026.

== Details ==
There were 7 cars per train, arranged with 2 riders across in 2 rows, making a total of 28 riders per train.

== Elements ==
Inversion
Vertical Loop
Cobra Roll
Double Corkscrew
Quadruple Heartline Roll
Heartline Roll

== Gallery ==
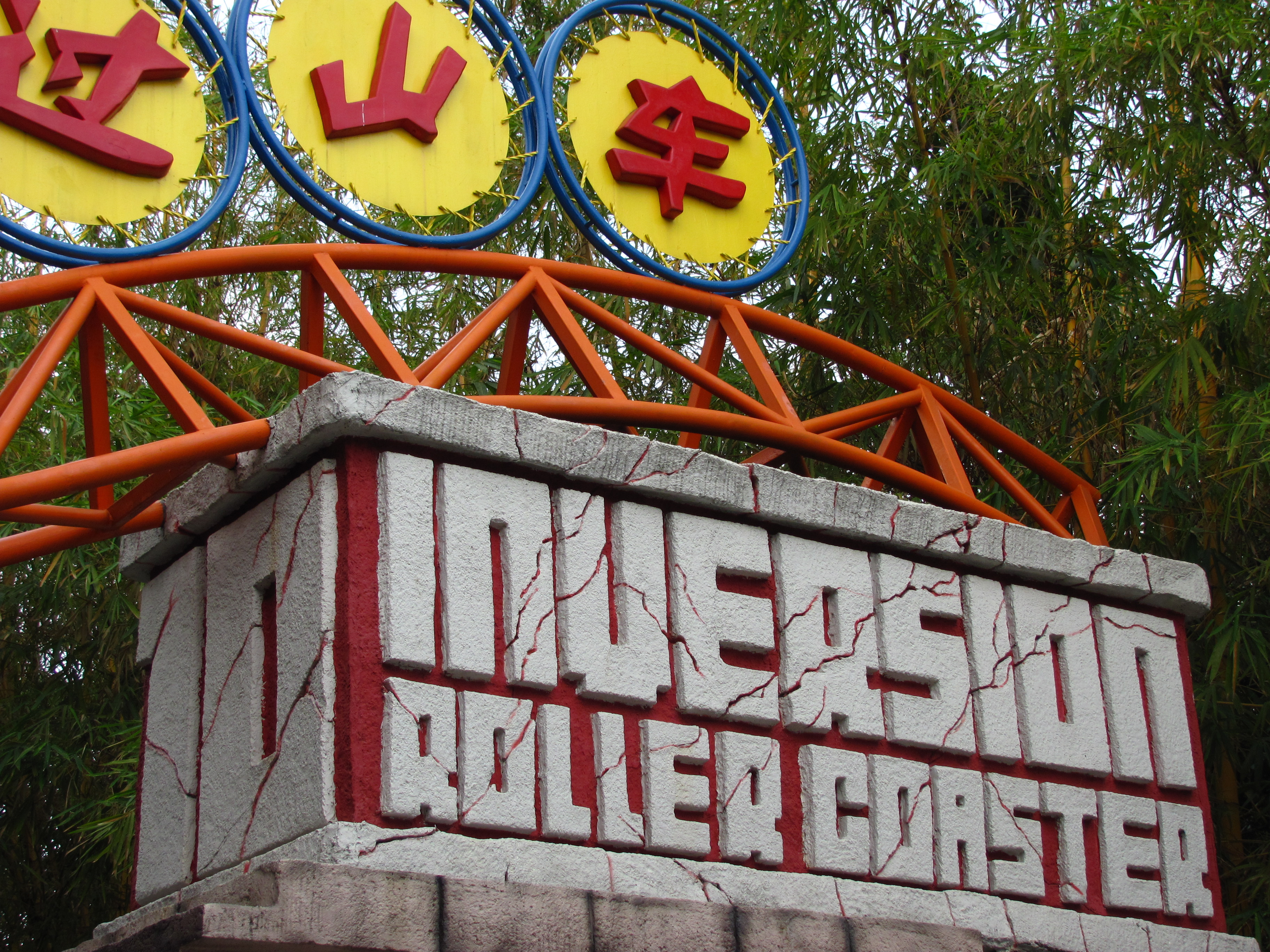
The sign stating the ride's name

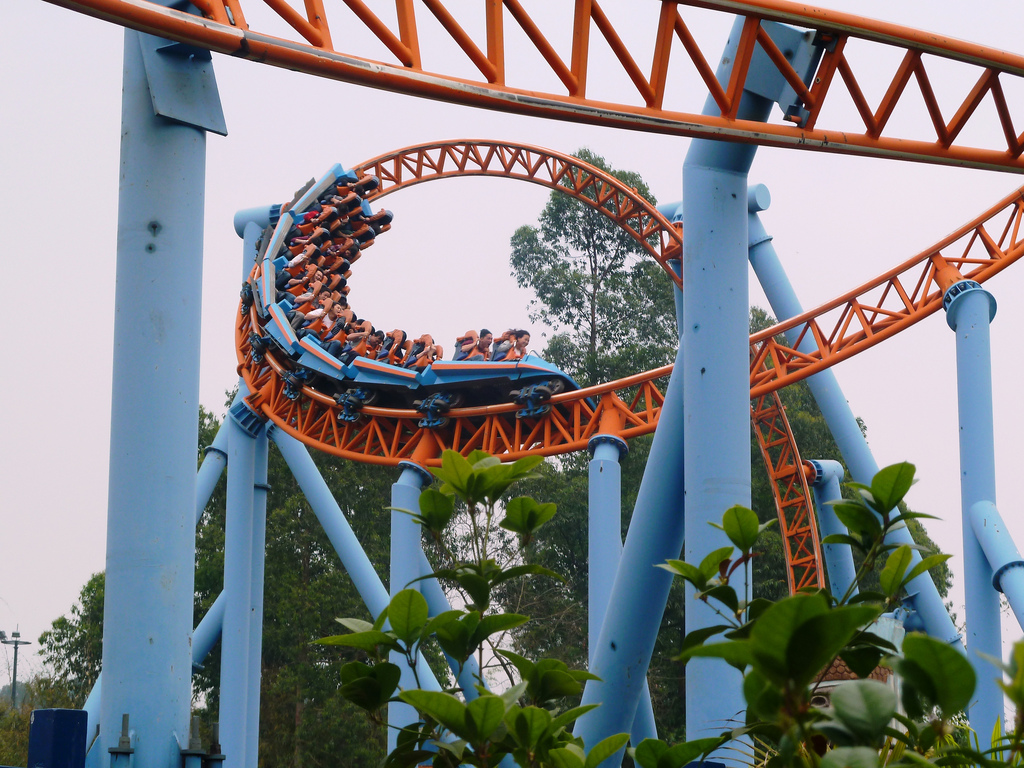
One of the inversions

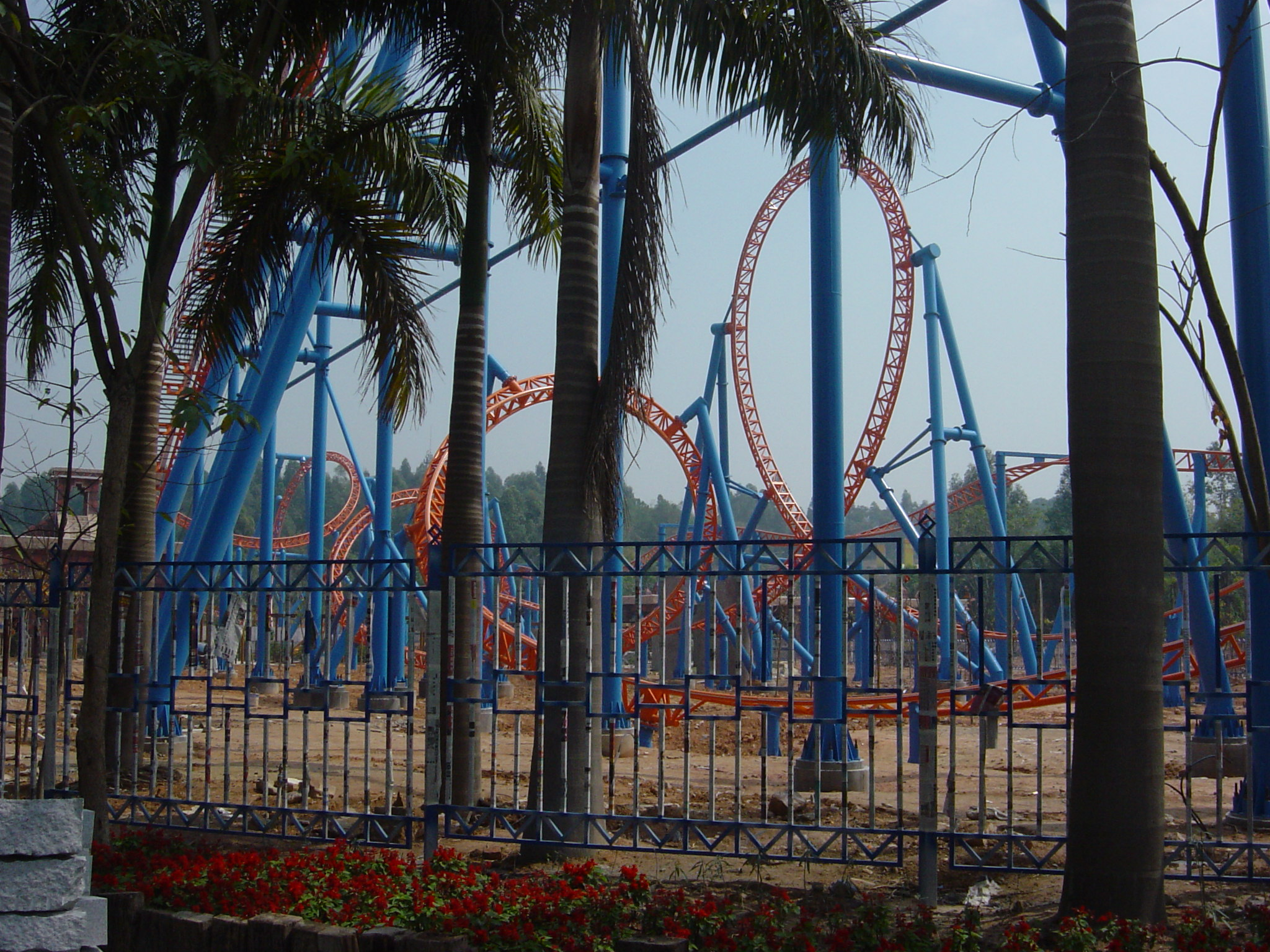
The ride under construction in 2006

Preceded by Colossus	World's Most Inverting Roller Coaster; February 1, 2006 – May 31, 2013; With: Colossus 2006–2013	Succeeded by The Smiler
