= Colossus (Thorpe Park) =

10 inversion roller coaster at Thorpe Park

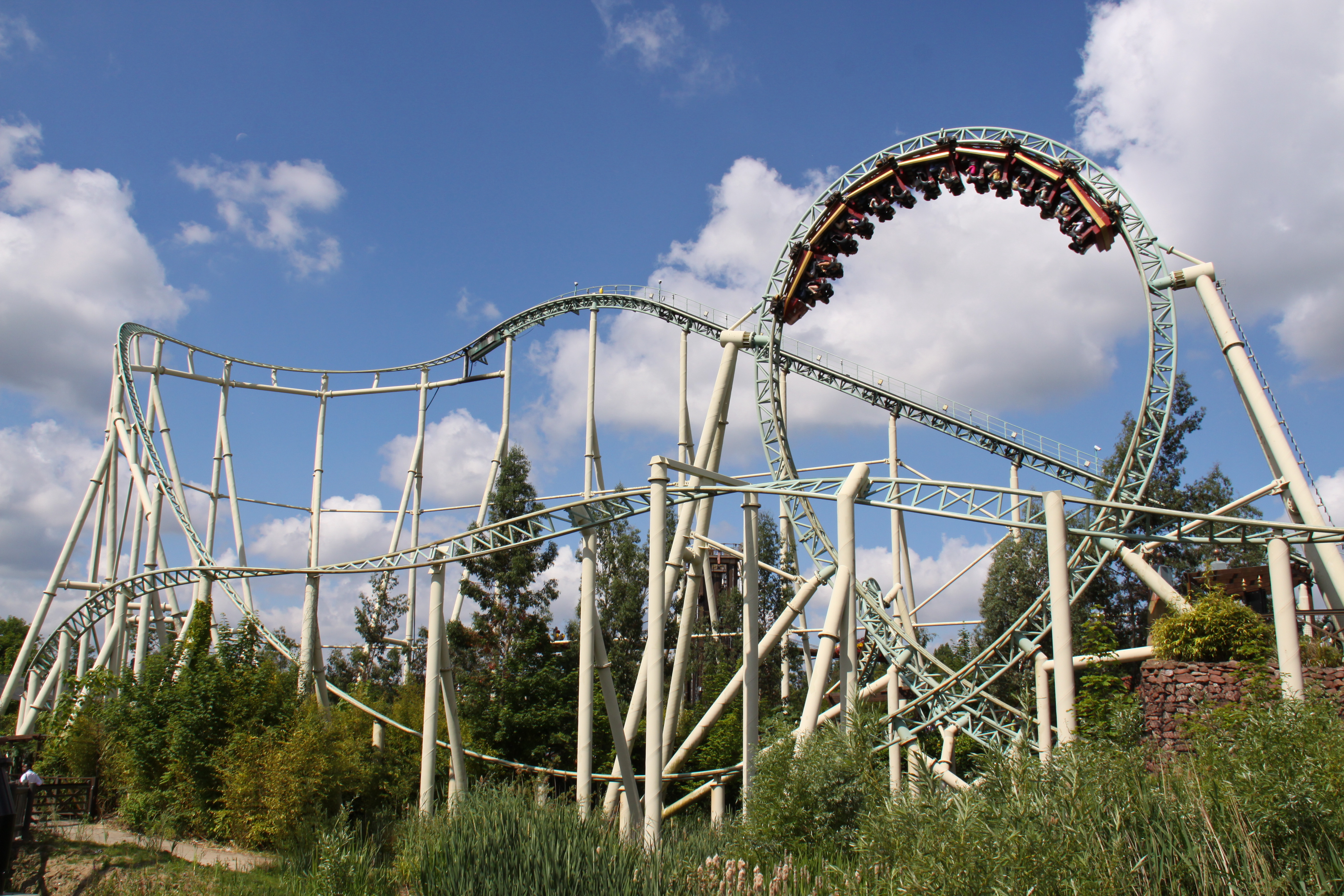
- View of Colossus

Thorpe Park
- Location: Thorpe Park
- Park section: Lost City
- Coordinates: 51.403243°N 0.512959°W
- Status: Operating
- Opening date: 22 March 2002
- Cost: £13.5 million

General statistics
- Type: Steel
- Manufacturer: Intamin
- Designer: Werner Stengel
- Model: Multi Inversion Coaster
- Track layout: 10 Inversion Revision A
- Lift/launch system: Chain lift hill
- Height: 98 ft (30 m)
- Drop: 97 ft (30 m)
- Length: 2,789 ft (850 m)
- Speed: 45 mph (72 km/h)
- Inversions: 10
- Duration: 1:32
- Height restriction: 140–196 cm (4 ft 7 in – 6 ft 5 in)
- Trains: 2 trains with 7 cars; riders arranged 2 across in 2 rows for a total of 28 riders per train
- Restraints: Over the shoulder restraints
- Fastrack available
- Wheelchair accessible
- Colossus at RCDB

Colossus is a steel roller coaster at Thorpe Park in Surrey, England, and the park's first major attraction. It was built by Liechtenstein-based manufacturers Intamin and designed by Werner Stengel as an adaptation of Monte Makaya in Brazil. Colossus is well known for being the world's first roller coaster with ten inversions; an exact replica, called the 10 Inversion Roller Coaster, was later built at Chimelong Paradise in Guangzhou, China. It retained its title of having the most inversions on any other roller coaster in the world until The Smiler at Alton Towers took the record in 2013.

The ride’s trains, manufactured by Intamin, are similar in style to those used on their Mega Coaster models, with the sides of the train removed to create an open design. This configuration presented safety concerns, as riders could extend their legs outside the train while it was in motion. For a brief period in 2002 and 2003, the trains were fitted with metal bars along the sides to prevent riders from extending their legs outside the train. Later in 2003, the trains were upgraded with new-style restraints that addressed this safety concern, allowing the metal side plates to be removed.

The roller coaster is situated in the Lost City area, in the southeast of the park. Its layout features a vertical loop, a cobra roll, two corkscrews, and five heartline rolls. The ride is thematically designed around the ruins of a recently unearthed Atlantean civilization. Ian Habgood composed the music for both the ride and its surrounding area. During its planning and construction, the attraction was referred to as Project Odyssey.

During the 2023-24 off-season, Colossus was partially repainted as part of the Sparkle Project.

== Ride experience ==
=== Inversions ===
No.	Inversion
1	Vertical loop
2 and 3	Cobra roll
4 and 5	Corkscrew
6 to 9	Clockwise heartline roll
10	Anticlockwise heartline roll

=== The ride ===
The train leaves the station and immediately begins ascending the chain lift hill, reaching a maximum height of 30 m (98 ft). After disengaging from the lift, the train navigates a 180-degree left turn into its first drop, passing through a vertical loop. It then traverses a long airtime hill that passes beneath the ride exit and gift shop, creating a “head-chopper effect”, before sharply ascending into a cobra roll positioned in a partially flooded pit, allowing guests to view the element and enhancing the attraction’s visual spectacle. Exiting the cobra roll, the train enters the second phase of the layout. It snakes slightly to the left before passing through two corkscrew elements: the first inverts riders over the airtime hill, while the second passes over a pathway leading to the ride entrance. On-ride photographs are captured as the train levels out after the second corkscrew, at which point the train’s speed decreases rapidly. The ride continues through four consecutive clockwise heartline rolls, passing just 3 m (10 ft) above the pathway. A final left-hand bend guides the train slowly toward the station, followed by an unexpected counter-clockwise heartline roll. The train then decelerates into the final brake run, coming to a complete stop before riders disembark.

Preceded by Dragon Khan	World's Most Inverting Roller Coaster; March 22, 2002 – May 31, 2013; With: 10 Inversion Roller Coaster 2006–2013	Succeeded by The Smiler
