= The Smiler =

Roller coaster in Staffordshire, England

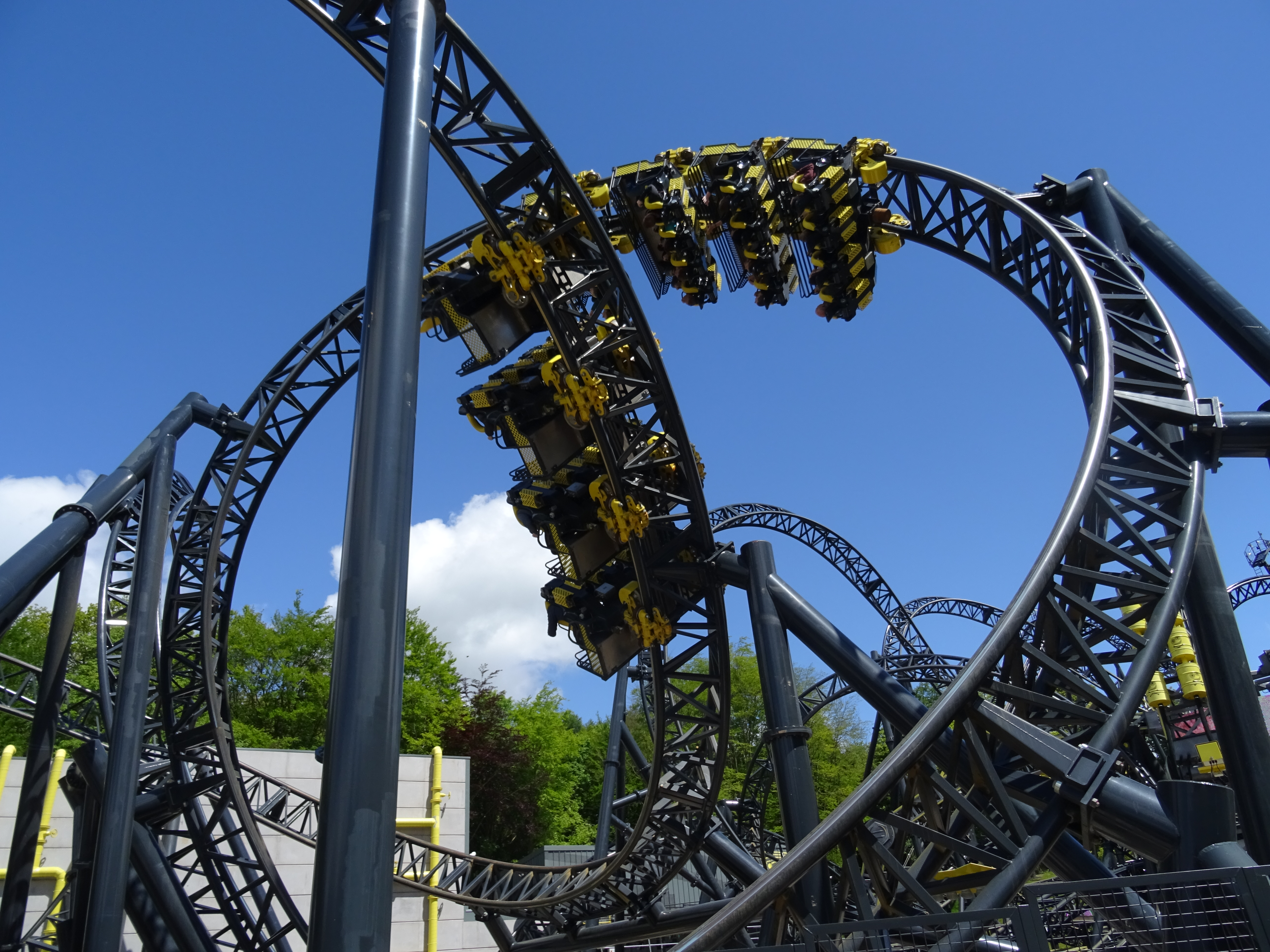
- Dueling trains on The Smiler

Alton Towers Resort
- Location: Alton Towers Resort
- Park section: X-Sector
- Coordinates: 52°59′14″N 1°53′43″W
- Status: Operating
- Opening date: 31 May 2013
- Cost: £18 million
- Replaced: The Black Hole

General statistics
- Type: Steel
- Manufacturer: Gerstlauer
- Model: Infinity Coaster
- Track layout: Infinity Coaster 1170
- Lift/launch system: Two chain lift hills
- Height: 30 m (98 ft)
- Length: 1,170 m (3,840 ft)
- Speed: 85 km/h (53 mph)
- Inversions: 14
- Duration: 2:45
- Capacity: 1,050 riders per hour
- G-force: 4.6
- Height restriction: 140 cm (4 ft 7 in)
- Trains: 5/4 trains with 4 cars; riders arranged 4 across in a single row for a total of 16 riders per train
- Fastrack available
- Single rider line available
- The Smiler at RCDB

The Smiler is a steel roller coaster located at Alton Towers in Staffordshire, England. The Infinity Coaster model from Gerstlauer set a world record for most inversions on a roller coaster when it opened in 2013, featuring 14 inversions that include dive loops, sidewinders, corkscrews, and other inverting elements. The ride is located in the X-Sector area of the park. In 2015, a major collision between two trains left five riders seriously injured and resulted in the ride's temporary closure.

== Development ==
A new ride was planned for the site previously occupied by the Black Hole, an indoor roller coaster which had closed in 2005. A planning application to build The Smiler was submitted to the local authority in December 2011. Permission was granted on 15 March 2012 following a Staffordshire Moorlands Council meeting. Gerstlauer, a German manufacturing company, was hired to build the roller coaster. Alton Towers subsequently announced the new ride, codenamed Secret Weapon 7 (SW7), would open in the 2013 season. The codename followed the park's tradition for previous roller coasters during their planning. The park began dismantling the remaining Black Hole building in April 2012.

On 17 October 2012, information about the coaster was revealed to the public including its maximum speed, track length, ride time, passengers per train and ride cost. The first pieces of track also arrived later that month.

The name of the roller coaster was revealed as The Smiler in the Metro newspaper on 21 January 2013, and the scheduled opening was delayed to May. Over the next two months, the trains were received, and vertical construction was completed on the first lift.

John Wardley, a ride consultant on the project, confirmed in a radio interview on 19 April 2013 that The Smiler would feature more inversions than any other roller coaster in the world. Although construction had revealed this earlier, the statement was the first official confirmation that The Smiler would break the inversion record. In an earlier interview, Wardley had said that The Smiler would have "5 mind manipulating elements that play around with you on the ride, so it's more than just a physical rollercoaster."

=== Promotion ===
Promotion for The Smiler started around the same time as construction began when, on 11 April 2012, a minisite was launched allowing visitors to register for updates on the ride's progress. A competition to be the first to ride the rollercoaster started in July. A countdown timer on the ride mini-site revealed an initial scheduled opening date of 16 March 2013.

During the ride's construction, promotional stunts included overnight spray painting of a stencil logo (later revealed as the ride logo) all over the park and later appearing in various forms across the country, including billboards in London; ticket barriers at Leeds railway station; projected onto various buildings including Big Ben; and sprayed onto flocks of sheep in areas including Leicestershire, Devon and Perthshire.

In February 2013, a free game app was released, containing a 3D recreation of the ride and a preview of the ride's merchandise.

Between April and May, Alton Towers uploaded four episodes of a promotional video series named "Smile Always". This was followed by footage of weather presenter Laura Tobin riding The Smiler, live on ITV's Daybreak programme and an advertising campaign on boxes of Krave cereal.

=== Opening ===
Having already been delayed from March, the scheduled May opening was further delayed after technical issues reportedly found during testing and an evacuation from the ride's lift hill was required during a press preview event. Following the preview incident, Alton Towers explained on their website that The Smiler would not open on the originally scheduled date due to "unforeseen teething problems". Alton Towers later announced it would allow guests who had made advanced bookings to change their tickets and on-site hotel reservations free of charge. The Smiler eventually opened on 31 May 2013.

== Description ==
The Smiler has a central themed feature named 'The Marmaliser', comprising a large truss-built structure with five 'legs', themed as a device that manipulates riders into smiling. Each leg features a different effect positioned over the track as the trains pass, including bright lights, water spray, water vapour, rolling brushes and rotating optical patterns. The Marmaliser also incorporates a wraparound LED screen that displays themed graphics.

Five trains can operate on the ride at once, leading to a theoretical capacity of 960 riders per hour.

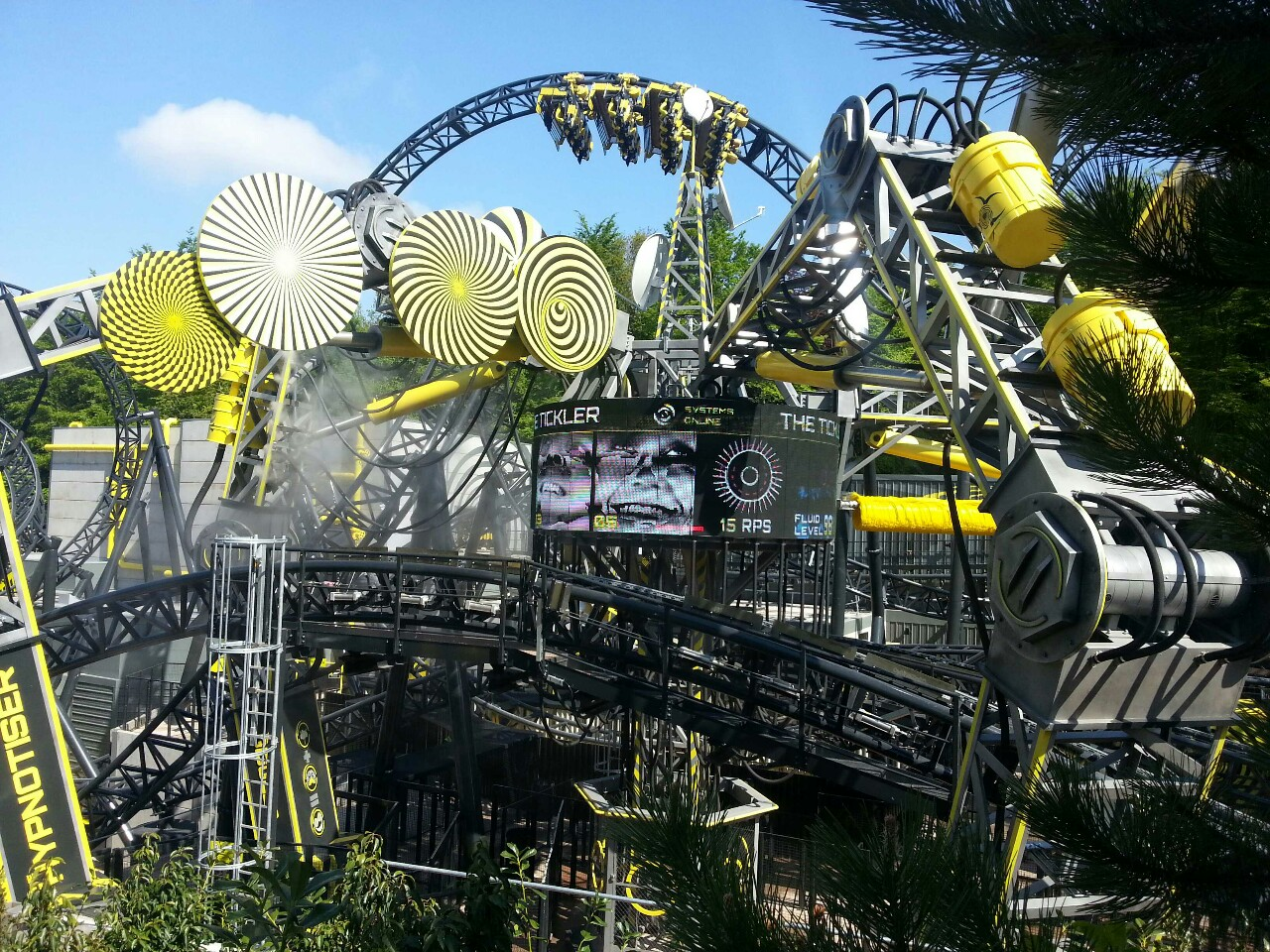
The Smiler's theming feature

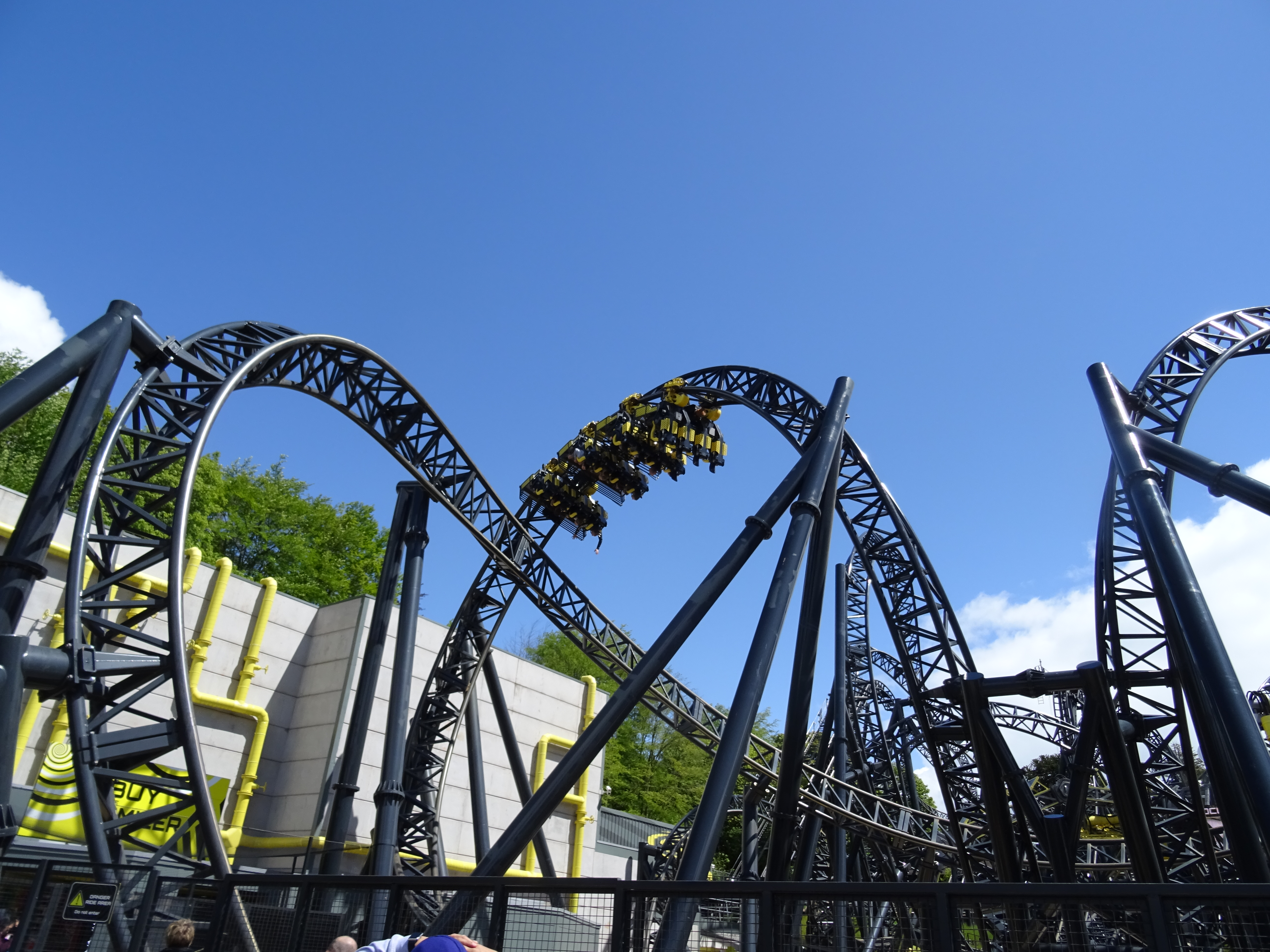
The ride's batwing element

=== Track elements ===
Inversion
1. Heartline roll
2. Corkscrew
3. Dive loop
4. Dive loop
5. Reverse sidewinder
6. Sidewinder
7. Corkscrew
8. Corkscrew
9–10. Sea serpent
11–12. Cobra roll
13–14. Double corkscrew

=== Ride experience ===
The train dispatches from the station, playing audio of a man saying, "Join us!" The train immediately enters into a sweeping drop 180 degrees to the left. Partway through this drop, riders encounter a heartline roll, the ride's first inversion. The train then comes to a stop on block brakes, before ascending the first lift hill. Upon reaching the top, the train drops into another 180-degree right turn before banking into the second inversion, a downward corkscrew. The train drops down into the next two inversions, two consecutive dive loops before travelling over a trimmed airtime hill into the ride's largest element, a Batwing (this element consists of a sidewinder and reverse sidewinder).

The train then travels through another corkscrew before reaching the second set of block brakes, after a brief pause the train ascends the second lift hill, this time at a 90° vertical angle. The train then enters another drop, 180-degrees to the left, banking into a downward corkscrew. Riders then navigate through a sea serpent roll, followed by a short drop into another trimmed airtime hill where the on-ride photo is taken. The train then dives into a cobra roll. Upon exiting the cobra roll, the train twists through two consecutive corkscrews before a short left turn into the final brake run. The words "Process complete" are visible to riders as the train returns to the station.

== Incidents ==
| Date | Reopened | Details |
|---|---|---|
| 21 July 2013 | 25 July 2013 | 48 people were evacuated from the ride after debris fell from a section of track. Some eyewitness reports described the debris as a 1-foot-long metal bar (0.30 m), while others described it as a bolt. The incident caused two sections of track to partially disengage creating a small gap in the track. |
| 30 July 2013 | 4 August 2013 | The ride was closed for five days after cracks were found around the base of one of the ride's supports. |
| 2 November 2013 | 7 November 2013 | Four people suffered minor injuries when they were struck by guide wheels that detached from the chain guide as the train ascended the vertical incline. |
| 2 June 2015 | 19 March 2016 | A fully loaded train travelling approximately 50 mph (80 km/h) collided with an empty, stationary train. Of the eleven riders who required medical treatment, five were seriously injured. Two required partial leg amputations in the weeks following the incident. According to reports, the train carrying passengers was stopped automatically on the lift hill by the safety block system that prevents two trains from occupying the same section of track. It correctly detected that the empty train sent previously had stalled. A ride engineer manually overrode the system allowing a ride operator to restart the halted train, which led to the collision. |

=== June 2015 incident ===
A major incident occurred on 2 June 2015 on The Smiler, when a train carrying passengers collided with an empty test train, resulting in serious injuries to a number of riders.

Shortly before the collision, an additional train had been introduced to the ride's circuit. An empty train dispatched for testing subsequently stalled on the track, reportedly after a gust of wind, triggering the ride's block safety system to halt further movement. Engineers on duty manually overrode the system, reportedly unaware that the stalled train remained on the course following the recent addition of another train. As a result, a following train carrying passengers was permitted to proceed and collided with the stationary train ahead.

Two of the riders sitting in the front row required leg amputations. Other riders in the back suffered from varying degrees of injury, from whiplash to punctured lungs and shattered kneecaps. It took three hours from when the initial crash happened to when the riders were freed.

Varney released a public statement stating:

This has been a terrible incident and a devastating day for everyone here. We have a very strong record of safe operation of our rides here at Alton Towers and it is our priority. I would like to express my sincerest regret and apology to everyone who suffered injury and distress today and to their families.

— Nick Varney, speaking to PRWeek after The Smiler's crash in June 2015

Subsequently, Merlin Entertainments decided to temporarily close Saw – The Ride at Thorpe Park and two other roller coasters at Chessington World of Adventures while safety protocols and procedures were evaluated for its multi-car roller coasters. The Health and Safety Executive (HSE) served a Prohibition Notice upon the Smiler, preventing the ride's use until remedial action had been completed. On 27 July 2015, it was stated by Merlin Entertainments chief executive Nick Varney that The Smiler would "not be opening this summer". The Health and Safety Executive initiated a criminal investigation.

Alton Towers and its owner Merlin Entertainments observed a drop in revenue and visitor numbers in the incident's aftermath. Due to the financial impacts of the incident, up to 190 jobs at the park were reportedly made redundant and six other rides remained closed during the following 2016 season.

The ride eventually reopened on 19 March 2016 with additional safety features. Merlin Attractions Operations Ltd was prosecuted by the HSE at North Staffordshire Justice Centre on 22 April 2016, in which the firm pleaded guilty. On 27 September 2016, after a two-day hearing at Stafford Crown Court, Judge Michael Chambers QC fined Merlin Entertainments £5 million; the value of the fine was reduced by one third from £7.5 million as credit for the guilty plea. In September 2018, Vicky Balch and Leah Washington, who lost their legs on the ride after the crash in June 2015, sued Merlin Attractions Operations Ltd for negligence and/or breach of statutory duty. The civil claims subsequently resulted in compensation settlements. In November 2019, Vicky Balch reached a multi-million-pound settlement with Merlin Entertainments for injuries sustained in the crash; the exact amount was not publicly disclosed.

| Preceded by Colossus; 10 Inversion Roller Coaster | World's Most Inverting Roller Coaster; May 31, 2013 – present | Succeeded by Current holder |
