= Busch Gardens Williamsburg =

Amusement park in James City County, Virginia

- Previously known as Busch Gardens: The Old Country (1975–1992); Busch Gardens Williamsburg (1993–2005, 2008–present); Busch Gardens Europe (2006–2008)
- Interactive map of Busch Gardens Williamsburg
- Location: James City County, Virginia, U.S.
- Coordinates: 37°14′5″N 76°38′40″W
- Status: Operating
- Opened: May 16, 1975; 51 years ago (as Busch Gardens: The Old Country)
- Owner: United Parks & Resorts
- Theme: Europe
- Slogan: "Celebrate, Connect, and Care for the natural world through the power of entertainment."
- Operating season: Year round
- Area: 422 acres (1.71 km^{2})

Attractions
- Total: 53
- Roller coasters: 11 (as of 2026)
- Water rides: 3
- Website: Busch Gardens Williamsburg Home Page

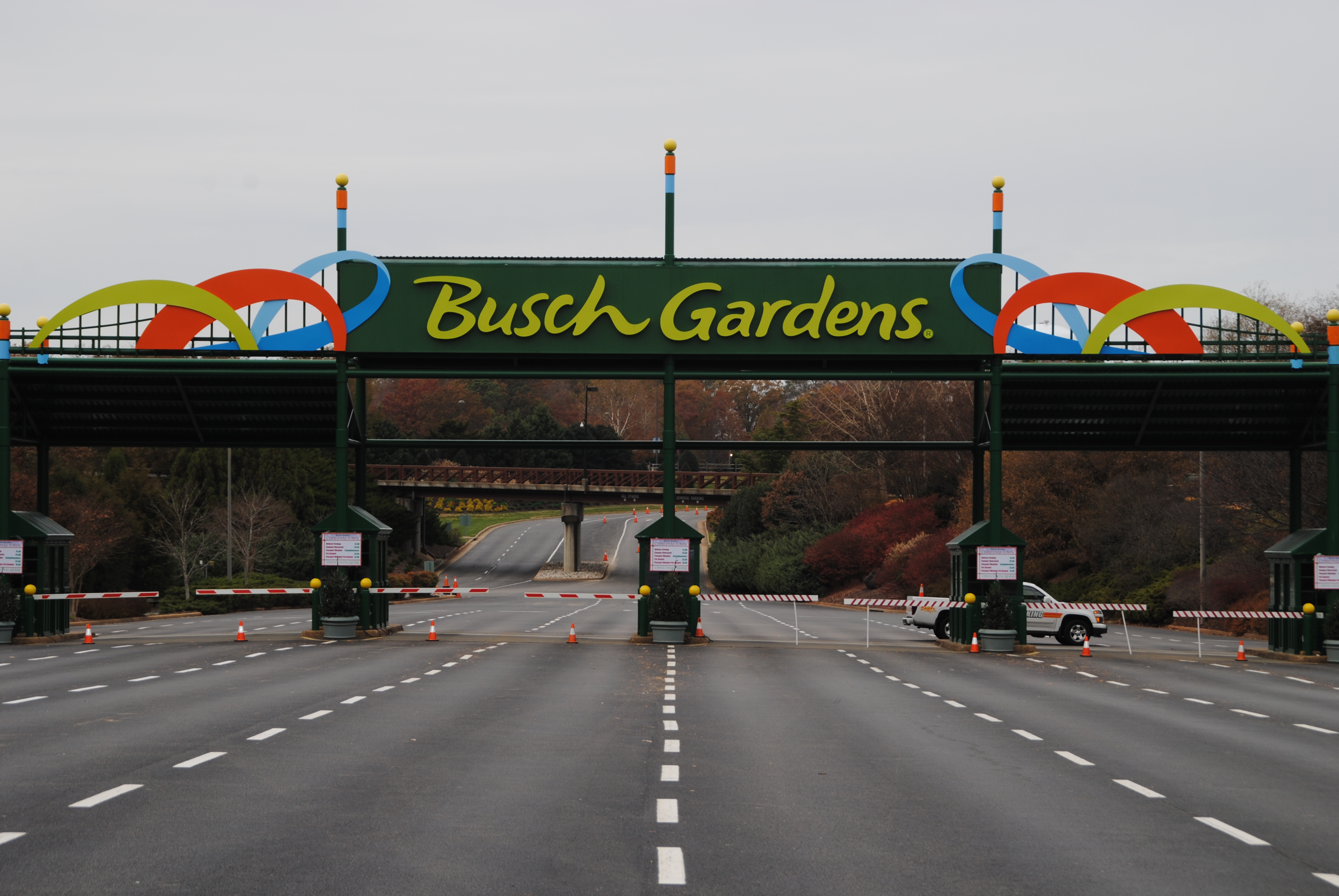
Main gate of Busch Gardens Williamsburg in 2014

Busch Gardens Williamsburg (formerly Busch Gardens Europe and Busch Gardens: The Old Country) is a 422-acre (1.71 km^{2}) amusement park in James City County near Williamsburg, Virginia, United States, located approximately 60 miles (100 km) northwest of Virginia Beach. The park was developed by Anheuser-Busch (A-B) and is owned by United Parks & Resorts as one of the two currently operating Busch Gardens parks.

The park opened on May 16, 1975, adjacent to Anheuser-Busch's brewery and near its other developments, including the Kingsmill Resort complex.

The park, originally named 'Busch Gardens: The Old Country', is themed to various European countries. In 1993, the park was renamed to Busch Gardens Williamsburg and briefly named Busch Gardens Europe from 2006 to 2008. In 2015, an estimated 2.78 million people attended the park, ranking 20th in overall attendance among amusement parks in North America. The park also features notable roller coasters, including Loch Ness Monster, Griffon, Verbolten, Pantheon, Alpengeist, and Apollo's Chariot.

== History ==
From the early 1970s, the Busch Gardens theme park was developed by Anheuser-Busch (A-B) as a portion of the company's development investment in the Williamsburg area, which grew to include a brewery, the Kingsmill Resort, and residential and office properties. The park opened 51 years ago in 1975 as Busch Gardens: The Old Country.

The St. Louis-based brewer invested in the area following negotiations held between Gussie Busch and Winthrop Rockefeller, who was the governor of Arkansas and the chairman of Colonial Williamsburg in the 1960s and 1970s. (Water Country USA, a local water park, was acquired by A-B in the 1990s, and added to the company's theme park activities, which also include a number of SeaWorld properties in other states.)

In 2008, Anheuser-Busch was acquired by Belgium-based InBev. The new owners announced plans to sell off the portions of A-B activities that were not part of the core beverage business. The Blackstone Group was selected in late 2009 to acquire and operate the 10 former A-B theme park properties, including two in the Williamsburg area. In July 2010, the adjacent Kingsmill Resort was scheduled to be acquired by Xanterra Parks and Resorts, owned by Denver-based Phillip Anschutz.

By mid-March 2020, the COVID-19 pandemic delayed the opening of the park for the 2020 season. The park remained closed until August 6, 2020, when they reopened with Coasters and Craft Brews. The event featured limited capacity, required advanced reservations, as well as temperature screening of guests upon arrival, and at select villages within the park. The park also hosted Taste of Busch Gardens Williamsburg, Halloween Harvest (in place of Howl-O-Scream), Christmas Celebration (in place of Christmas Town), Winter Weekends, and Mardi Gras events throughout the year.

Beginning in January 2021, the park began its year-round operation. The previous operating season of Busch Gardens Williamsburg was late March through early January. The Winter Weekends and Mardi Gras limited-capacity events marked the first time that the park had ever been open during the winter months.

== Overview ==
The park features a combination of roller coasters and Broadway-style shows. The park is divided into "countries", each representing its own unique style of food, music and themed attractions.

=== Conservation ===
Jack Hanna's Wild Reserve houses a variety of wild species including gray wolves and bald eagles. Busch Gardens is partnered with SeaWorld (also owned by United Parks & Resorts) in the SeaWorld & Busch Gardens Conservation Fund, to offer guests the opportunity to contribute to wildlife conservation. The Rhine River Cruise attraction's boats are battery-powered in an effort to cut back on power generation and prevent water pollution. In addition, Busch Gardens and Water Country USA both use insects rather than pesticides in the parks' commitment to organic gardening. All brochures, maps, show guides and paper products are made from recycled material.

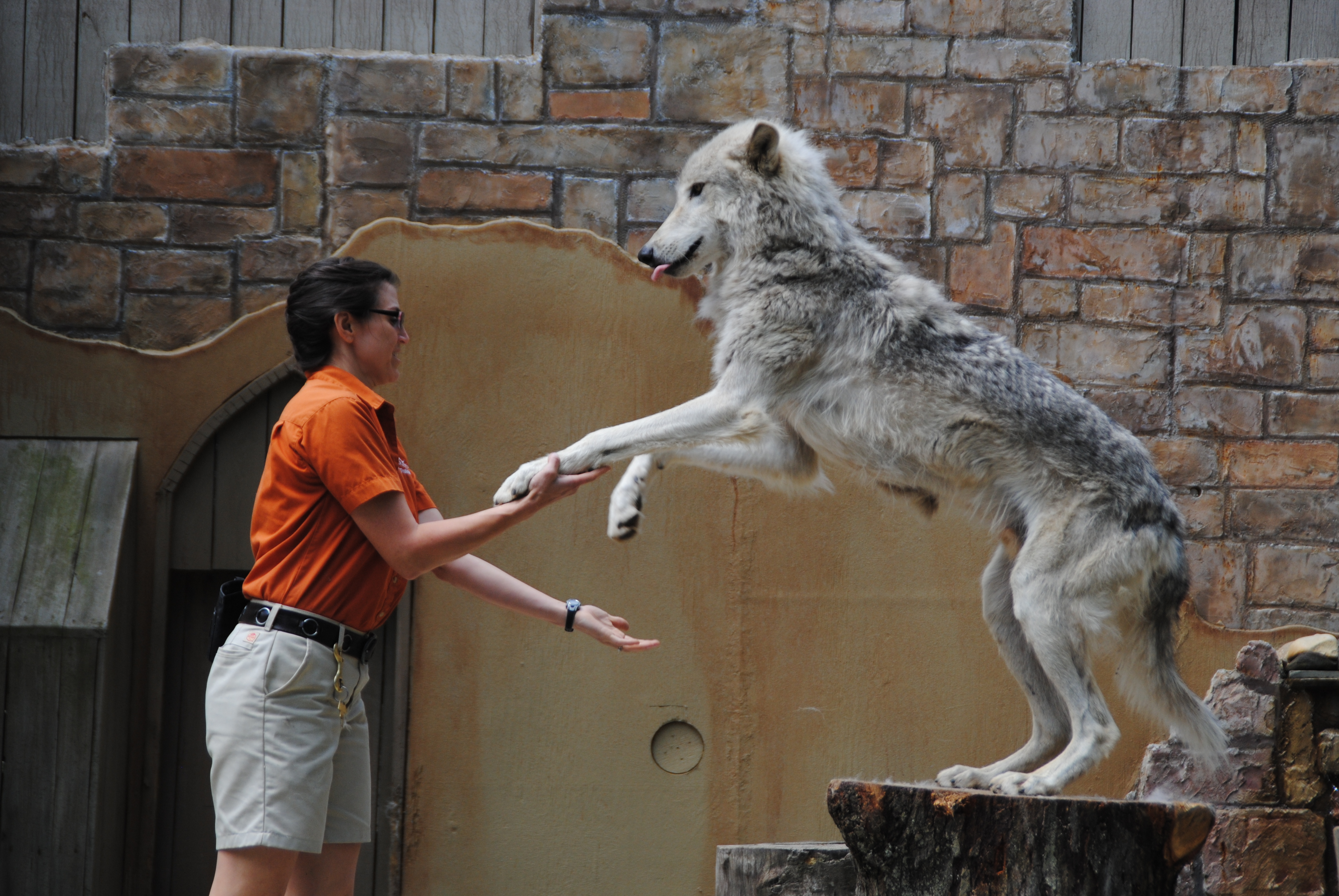
Gray Wolf Interacting with Trainer

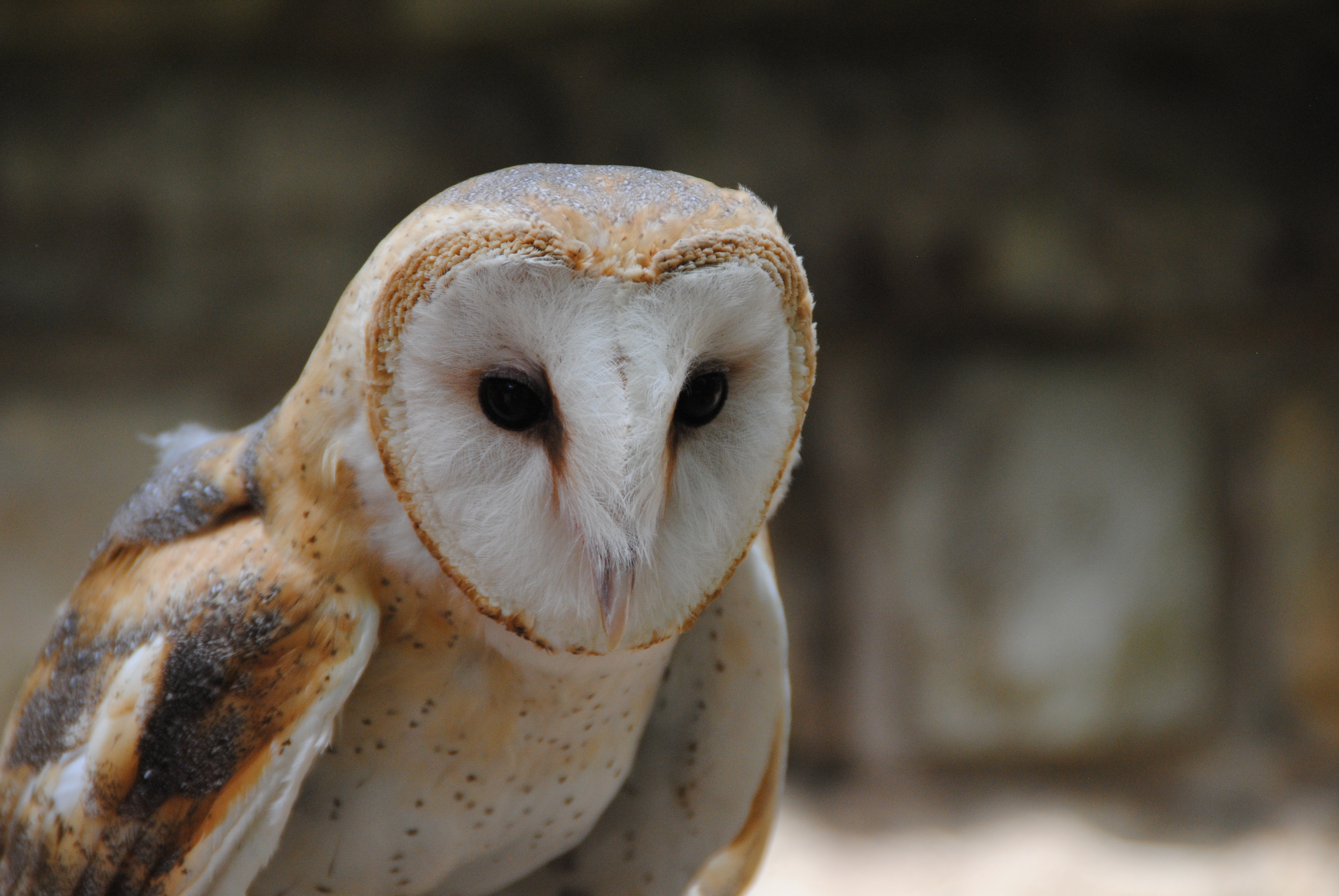
Barn Owl at Busch Gardens

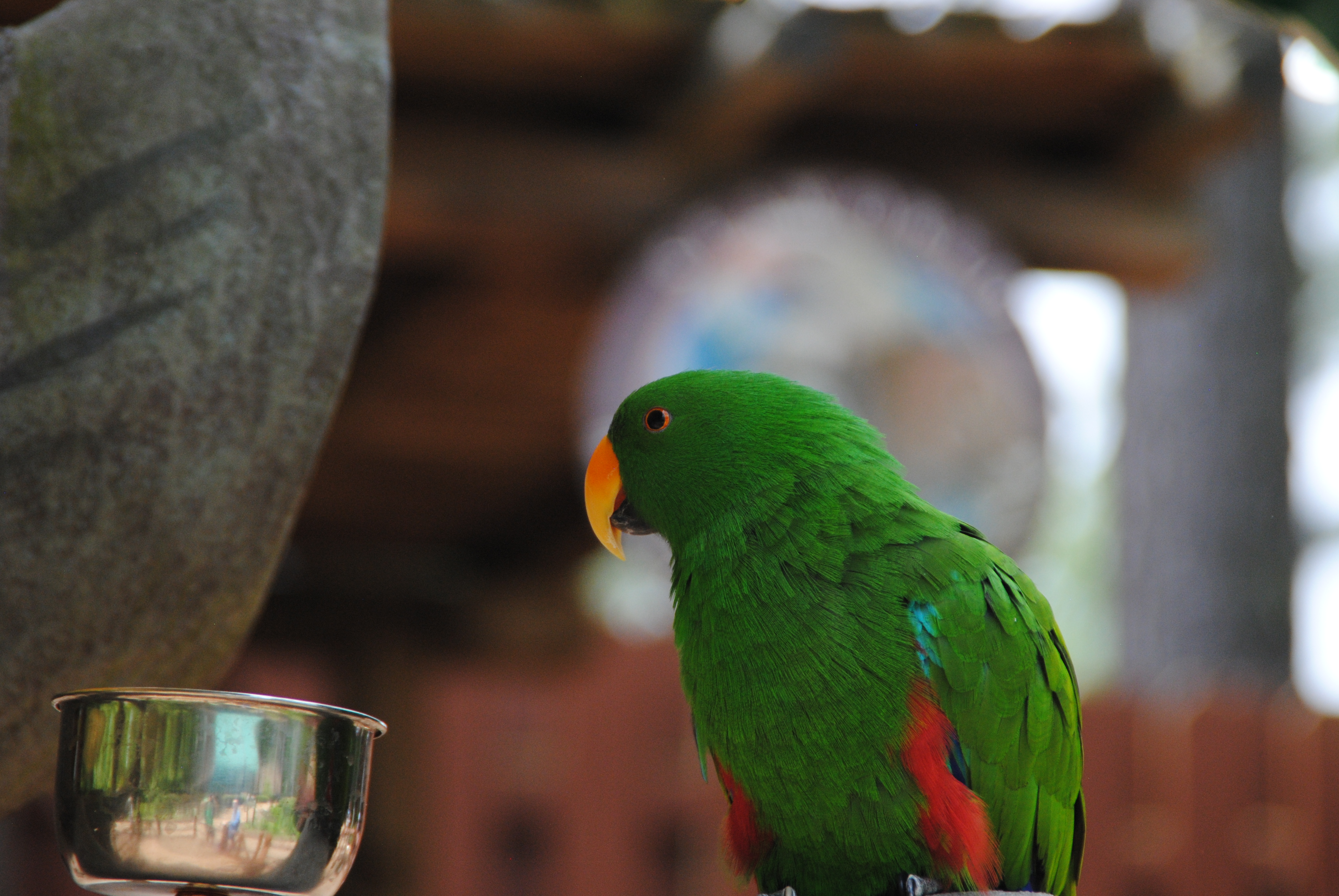
Eclectus Parrot at midday.

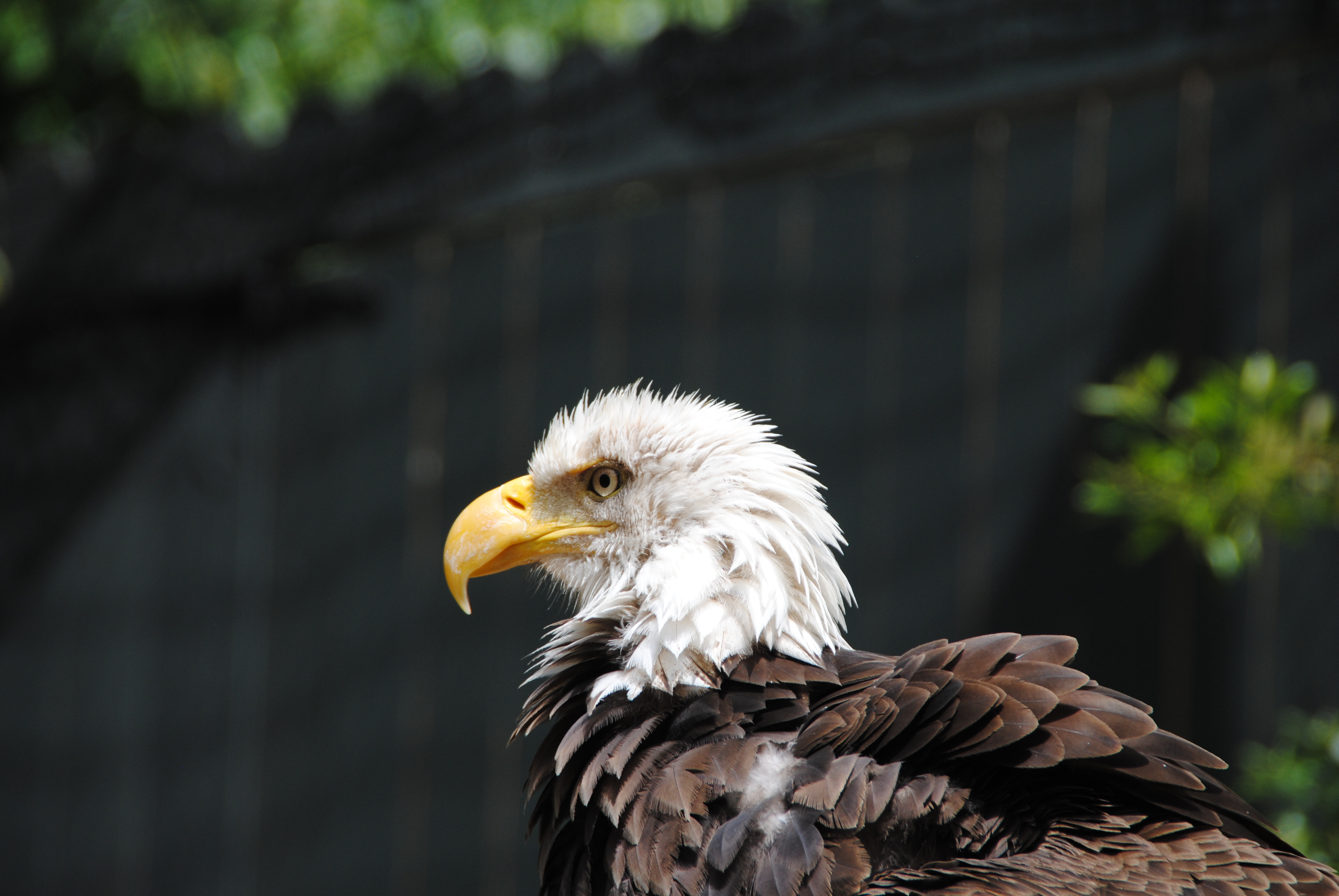
One of three bald eagles on display at Eagle Ridge.

=== Howl-O-Scream ===
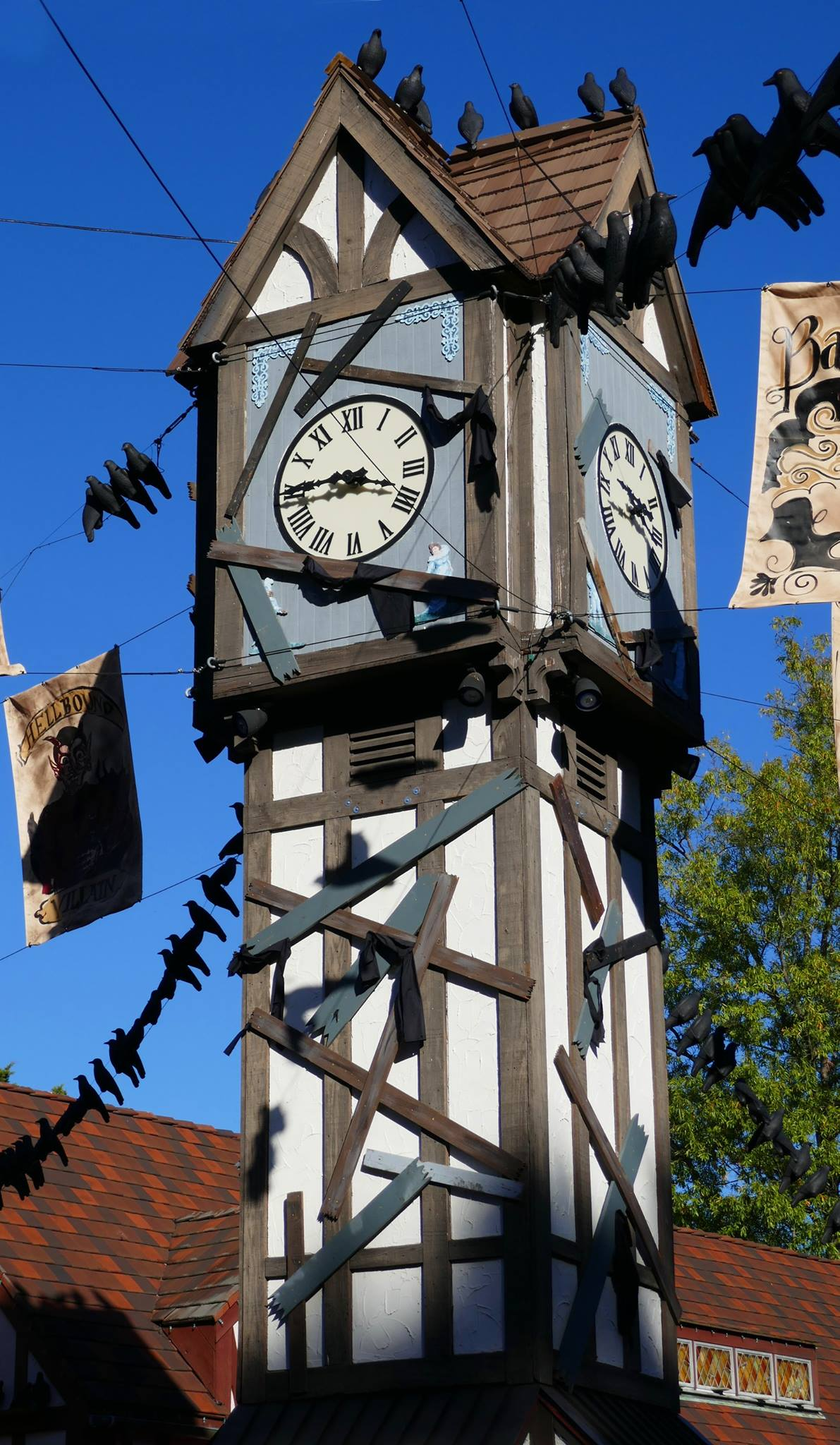
Big Ben in Banbury Cross (England), decorated for Howl-O-Scream

Howl-O-Scream, the park's signature Halloween event, began in 1999 and offers more than a dozen attractions featuring vampires, zombies, clowns, witches, and skeletons.

=== St. Patrick's Day ===
In 2021, Busch Gardens Williamsburg celebrated its first St. Patrick's Day celebration. This event celebrates Irish culture in all ten hamlets (or lands) throughout the month of March, featuring Irish-themed cuisine, music, live entertainment, and special events, as well as having the park's various rides in operation. Those attending Das Festhaus may view various Irish stepdance performances that have been shown in the park over the years, including the award-winning Celtic Fyre. Appearances from Virginia's Irish Dance Schools can also be seen in the San Marco Theatre. For younger children, a scavenger hunt is hosted by a leprechaun, Clancy, who is also available throughout the day for photos. For adults, there is a variety of alcoholic beverages available throughout the park, various Guinness products, and green beer.

=== Night of Oktoberfest ===
Night of Oktoberfest is an annual 21-and-up event hosted in the Oktoberfest part of the Germany Hamlet, started in 1976. The event offers German inspired food, alcoholic drinks, a DJ, games, raffles, and use of some select ride attractions in the Germany Hamlet of the park.

=== Christmas Town ===
Christmas Town is the park's Christmas event which began during the 2009 season. Several Christmas and winter holiday-themed attractions and shows are exclusive to the season, including a 50-foot (15 m) Christmas tree called "O Tannenbaum" that lights up in sync to Christmas music in the Oktoberfest hamlet of the park. Each show venue from the park offers a holiday-themed performance during Christmas Town, ranging from reinterpretations of classic Christmas stories (Scrooge No More) to ice skating (Twas That Night on Ice), and a-cappella performances (Gift of Harmony). Many of the flat rides are in operation as well as the park's train, skyride, and roller coasters (traditionally, Verbolten, InvadR and Pantheon since their opening, and recently Apollo's Chariot, though previous Christmas town seasons saw Tempesto, Griffon, and Alpengeist also operate.) During the celebration, the park is decorated with millions of lights and dozens of real Christmas trees. Shopping and dining are also a prominent part of Christmas Town, with many of the park's restaurants offering food and drinks catered to the season and colder weather. The event typically begins from the weekend before Thanksgiving, and continues every weekend until the week before Christmas, where it stays open for the rest of December until a few days after New Year's Day.

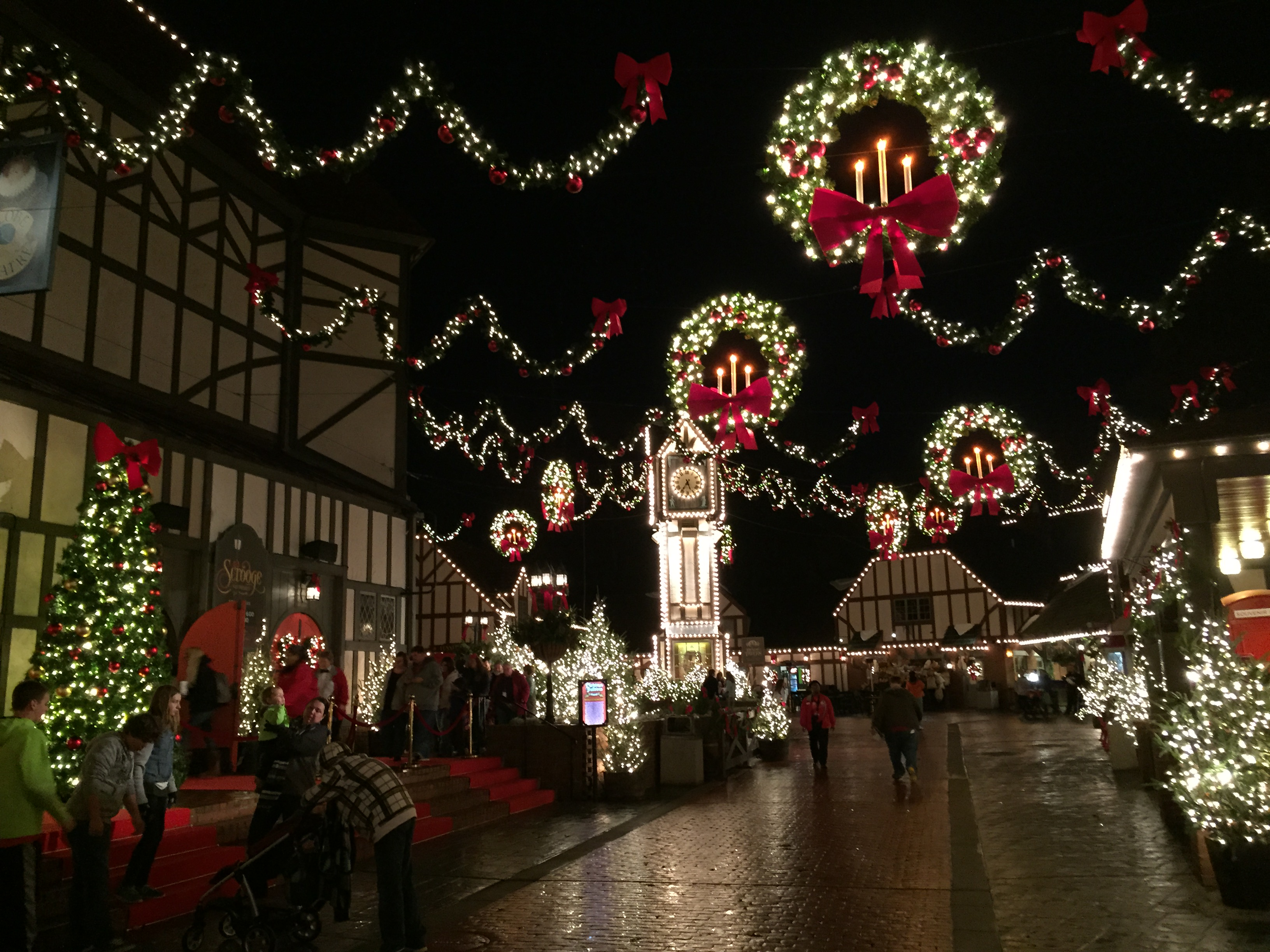
Banbury Cross, England in Christmas Livery.

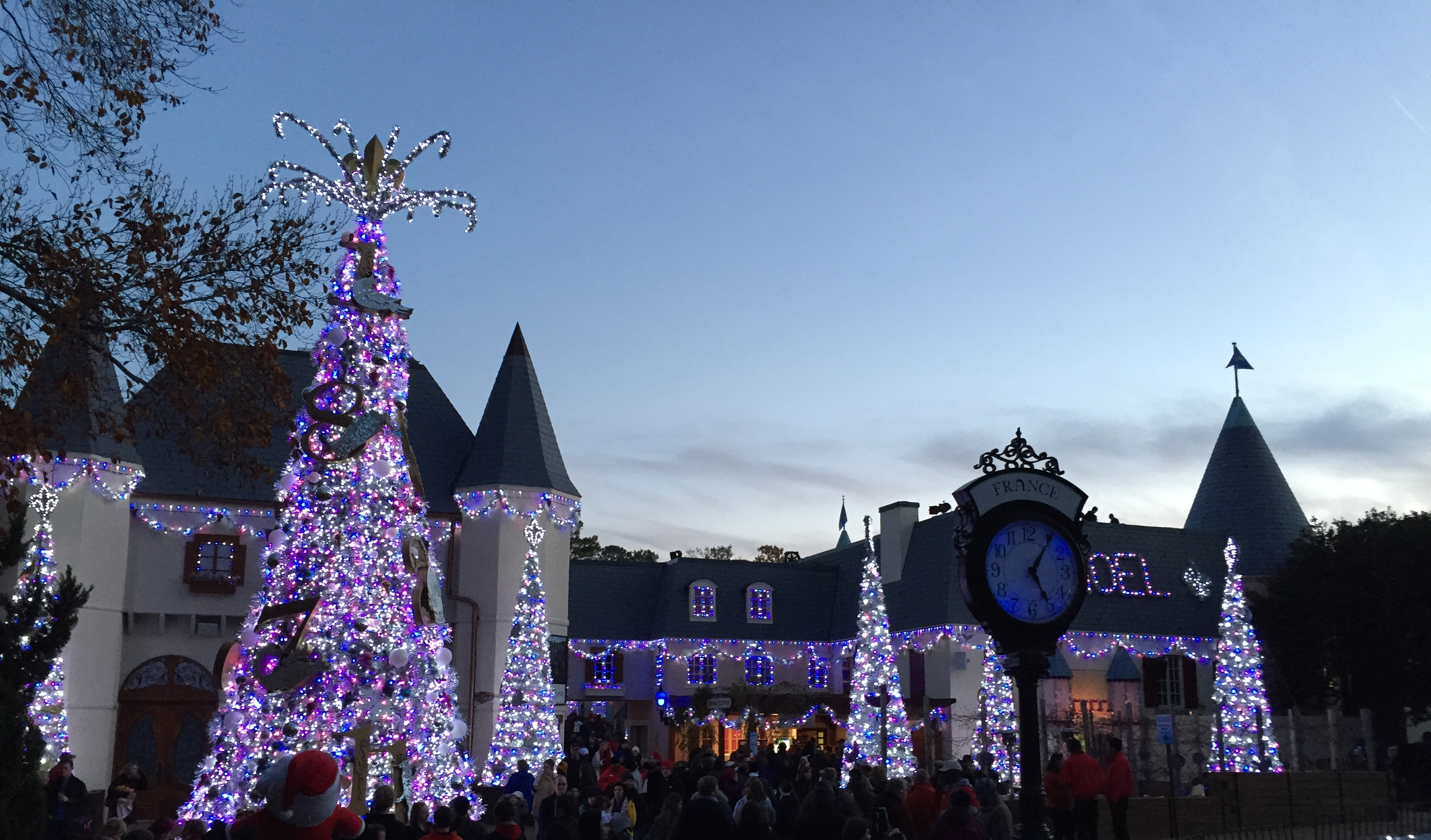
Aquitaine, France at Dusk.

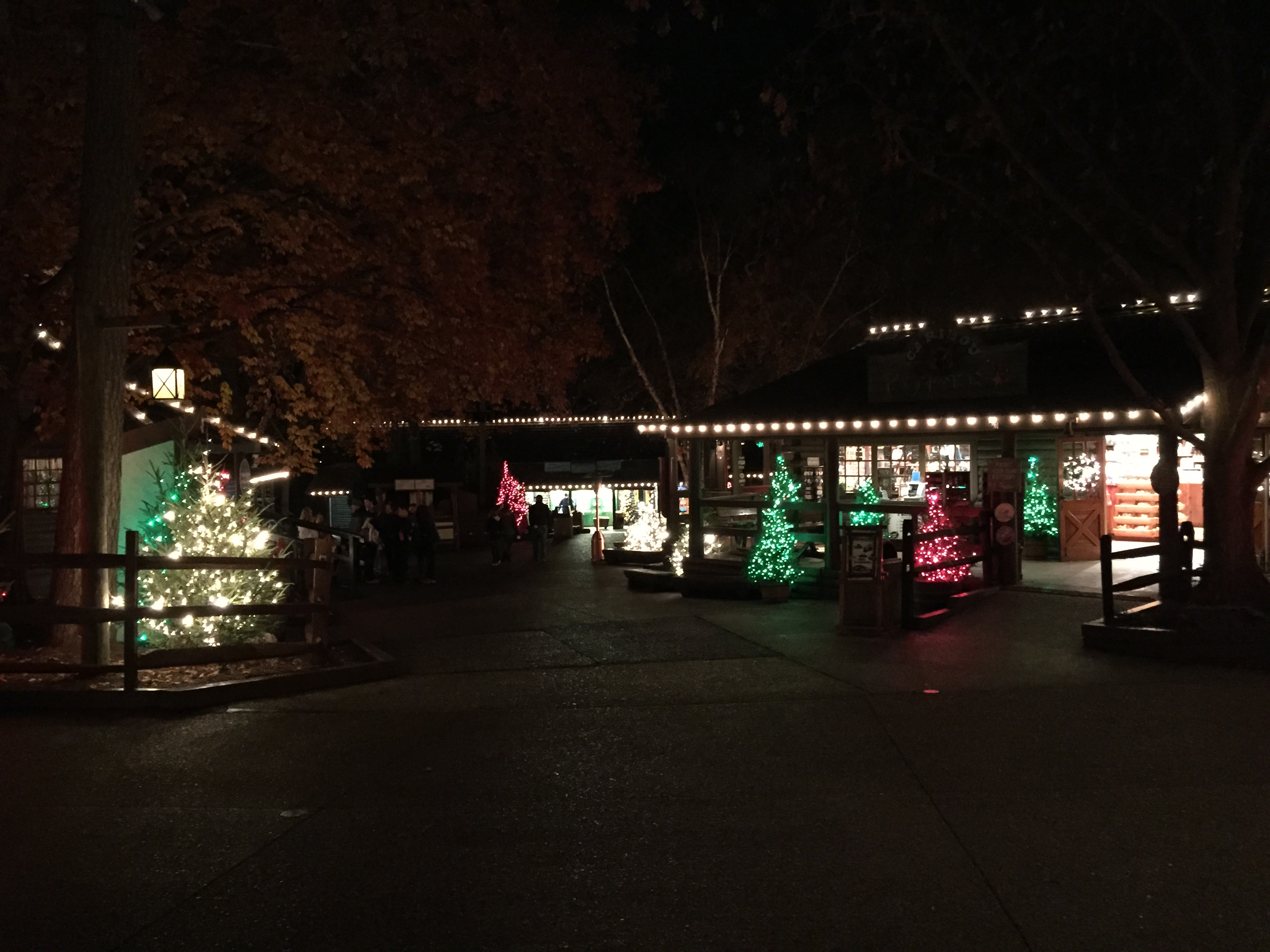
Nighttime View of New France.

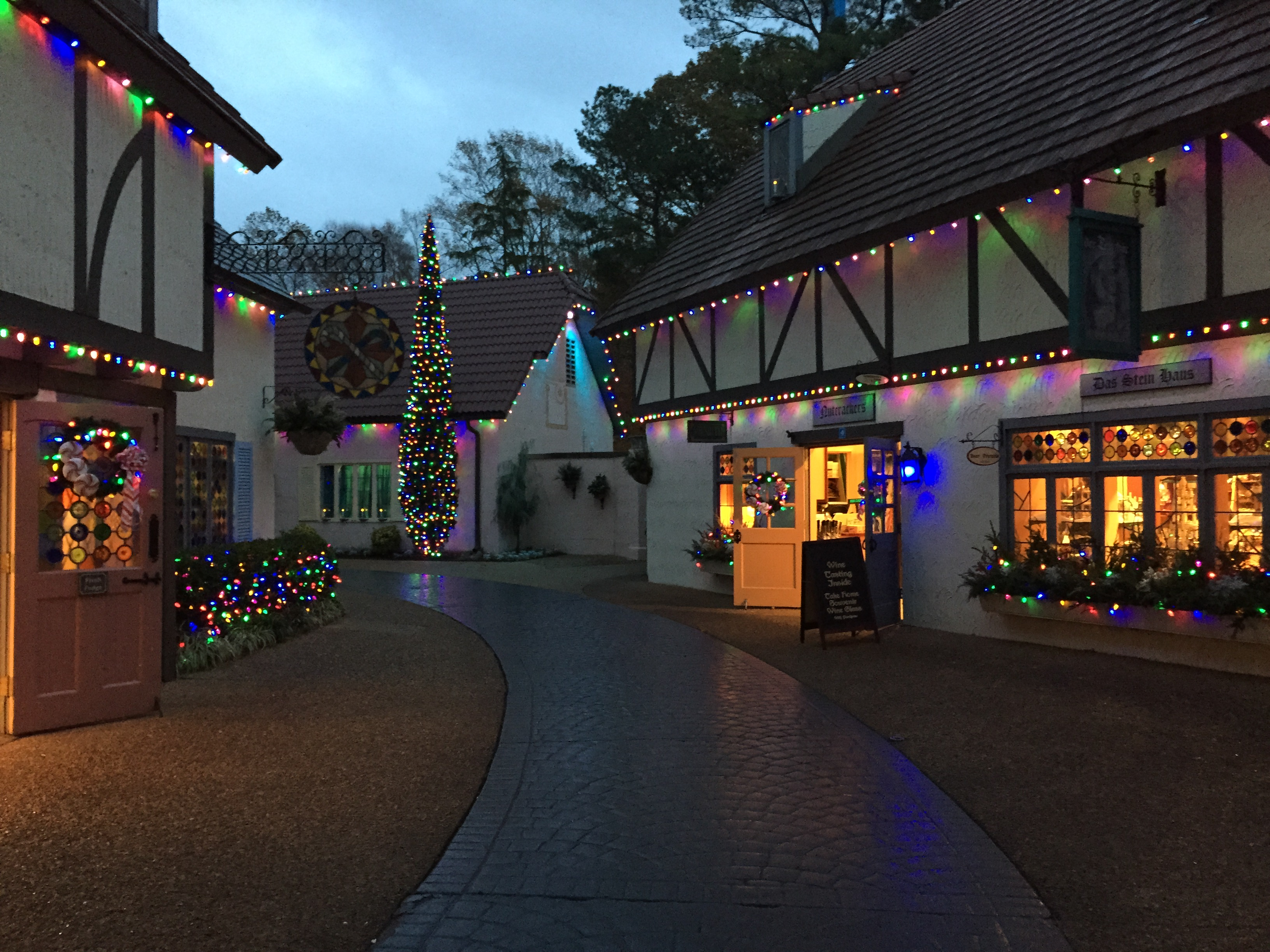
The Streets of the North Pole (formerly Rhinefeld, Germany) Adorned with Lights.

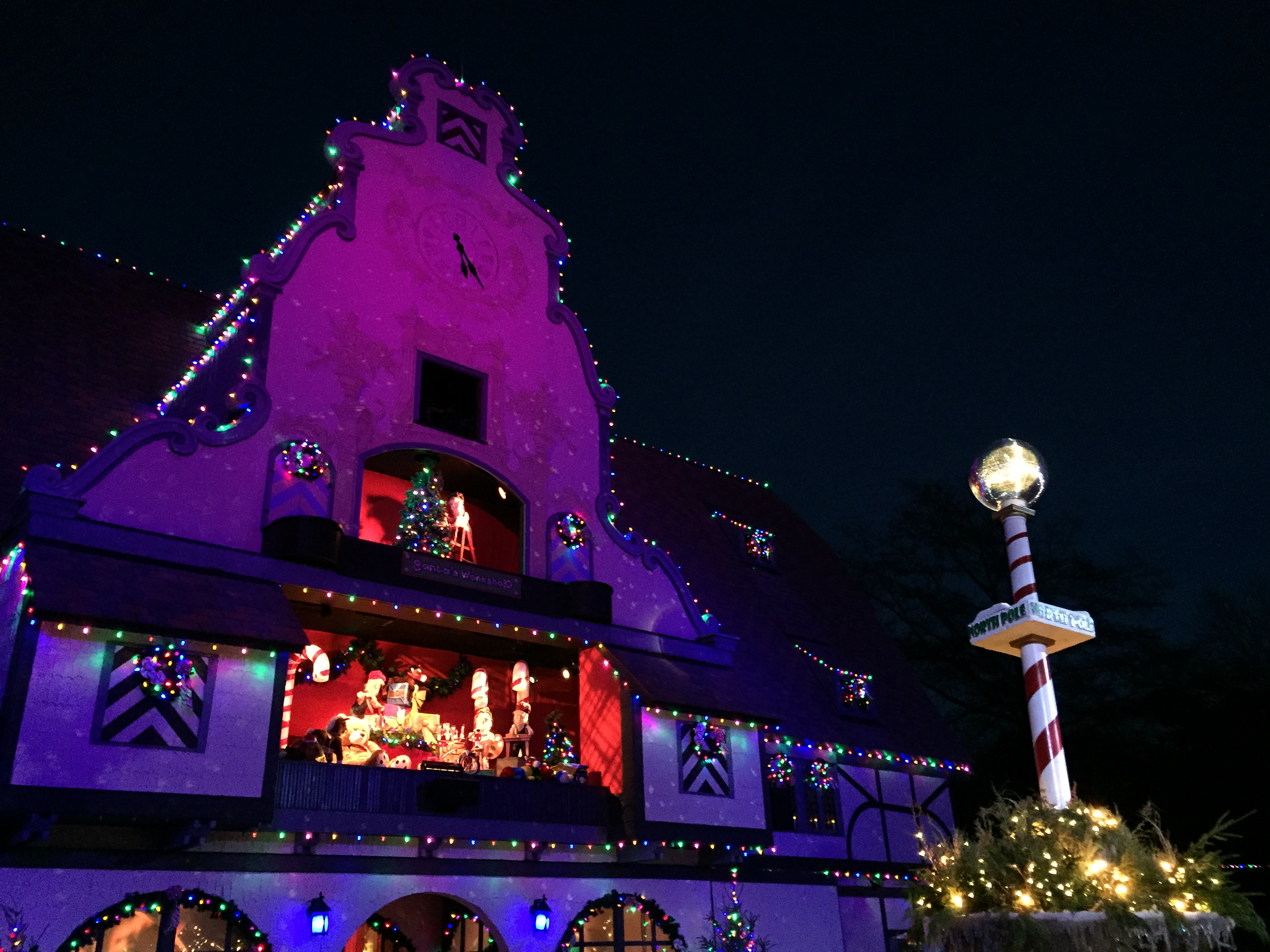
Town Center of the North Pole

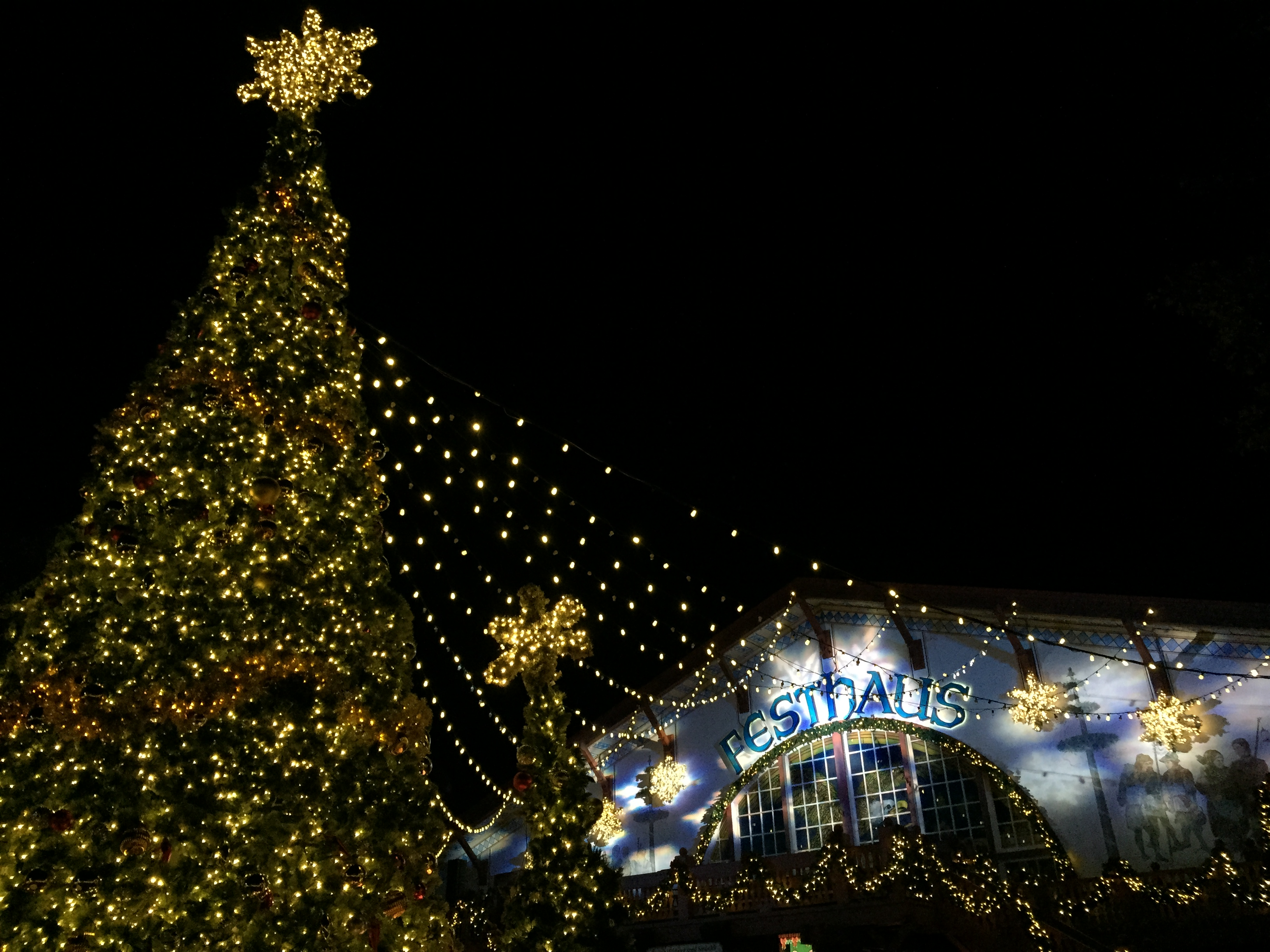
50-Foot Tall Christmas Tree with Das Festhaus in the Background.

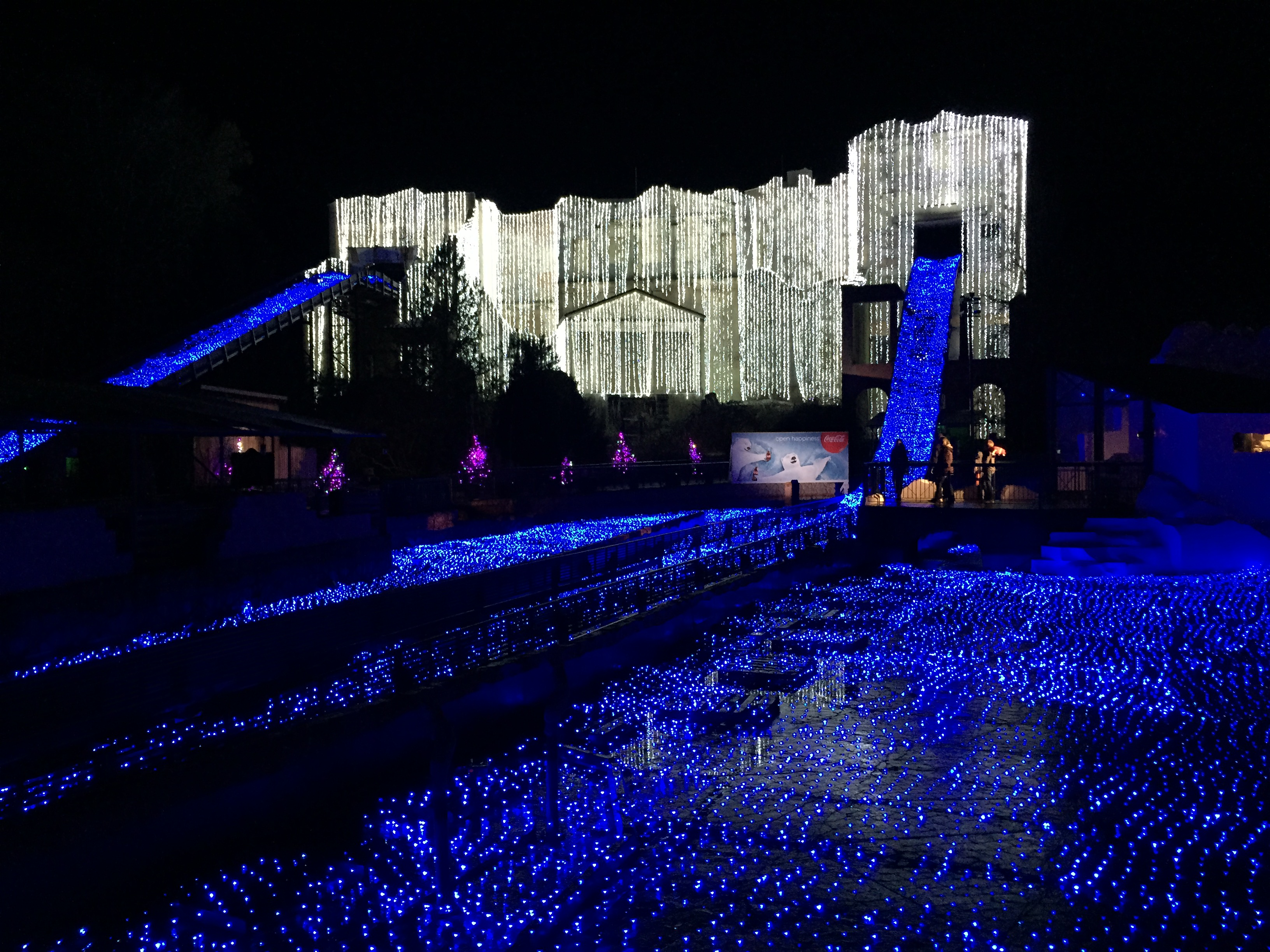
Italy's "Escape From Pompeii" Transformed into the Polar Pathway.

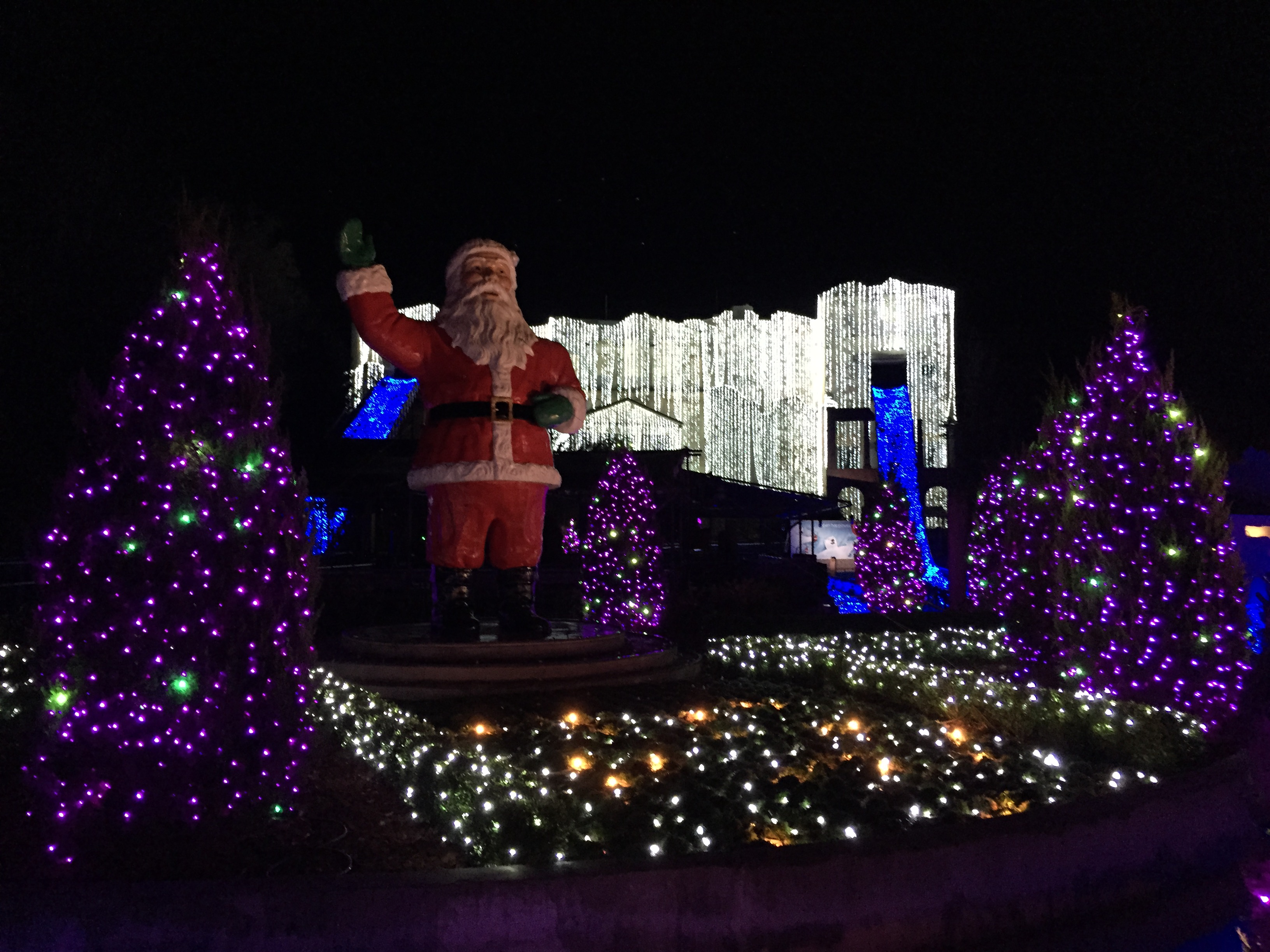
A View of Santa Claus with the Polar Pathway in the Background

== Hamlets ==
The park is separated into 10 different hamlets themed to traditional interpretations of European villages from England, France, Germany, Italy, Scotland and Ireland. They are listed in counter-clockwise order.

Busch Gardens Williamsburg features two main transportation attractions that provide convenient access to different areas of the park; The Aeronaut Skyride, a gondola lift that allows guests to travel between the Sesame Street Forest of Fun, Aquitaine, and Rhine Feld hamlets; and the Busch Gardens Railway, a replica steam train that transports guests between the Heatherdowns, Festa Italia, and New France hamlets. The train is not only a practical mode of transportation but also serves as a thematic element of the park's "Old Country" atmosphere. Families with young children can especially benefit from using the train as a means of traveling together and enjoying the park's various hamlets.

=== Banbury Cross (England) ===
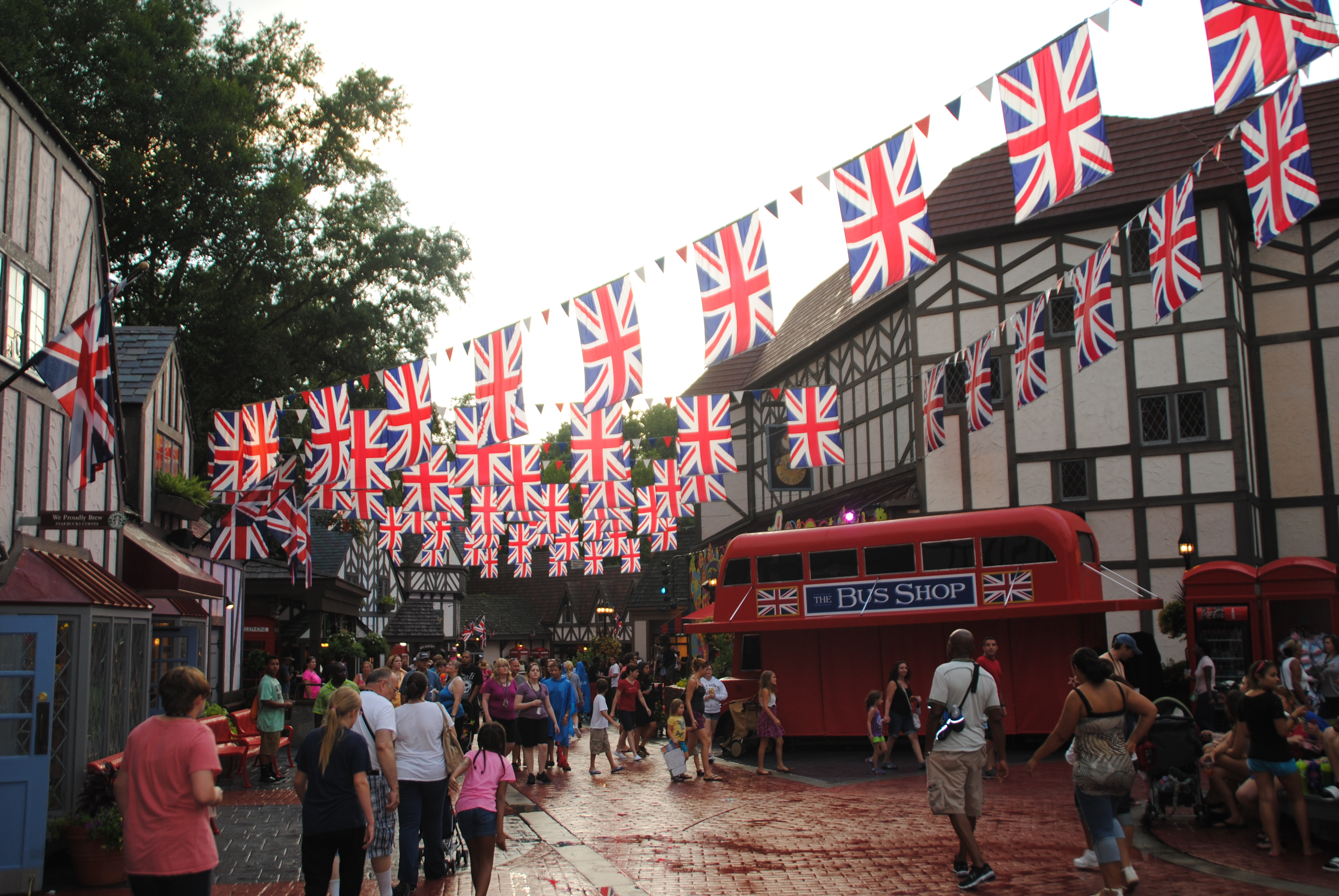
2014 Street View of Banbury Cross, England

Banbury Cross is fashioned after old England, with phone booths and classic Tudor English architecture. Guest Services windows are located next to the turnstiles of the main entrance gate. A simulacrum of the famous Elizabeth Tower (known colloquially as Big Ben) is the central element of this area. Banbury Cross also includes The Squire's Grill, serving breakfast and lunch, as well as a funnel cake shop, ice cream shop and candy store. The Globe Theatre, a double-sized replica of William Shakespeare's Globe Theatre, is the most prominent attraction in the hamlet.

- Globe Theatre – Opening with the live show Ghosts of the Globe, the space would primarily house magic and ice acts until its renovation into a 4-D theater, showcasing films including Haunts of the Old Country, Pirates 4-D, Sesame Street: Lights, Camera, Imagination!, and R.L. Stine's Haunted Lighthouse; a single live show, A Sesame Street Christmas, would play the venue during Christmas Town from 2009 (the event's debut) to 2012. The space was turned back into a full-time live performance venue in 2014, now using a versatile projection-mapped set.
  - Carnaval Imaginique – Mardi Gras musical revue featuring live circus acts.
  - When the Pages Turn – Kids' Weekends jukebox musical with puppetry following a young girl named Chloe as she explores the world inside her storybook.
  - Across the Pond: Legends of the U.K. – A jukebox musical following aspiring Newport News songwriter Abby Rhodes as she travels across London to present her song at the fictional Bellstar Records. The original song "Home" was released on streaming platforms alongside the show's opening.
  - Monster Stomp on Ripper Row – Howl-O-Scream jukebox musical based on the Jack the Ripper mythos, intended for slightly older audiences; continuation of the Stomp-inspired Monster Stomp franchise. Jack and his crew of rippers descend on a group of prostitutes, only for Jack to fall in love with his latest would-be victim, Mary Jane. Since 2013, the England hamlet has been the park's longest-running "terror-tory," Ripper Row, which acts as an extension of the show.
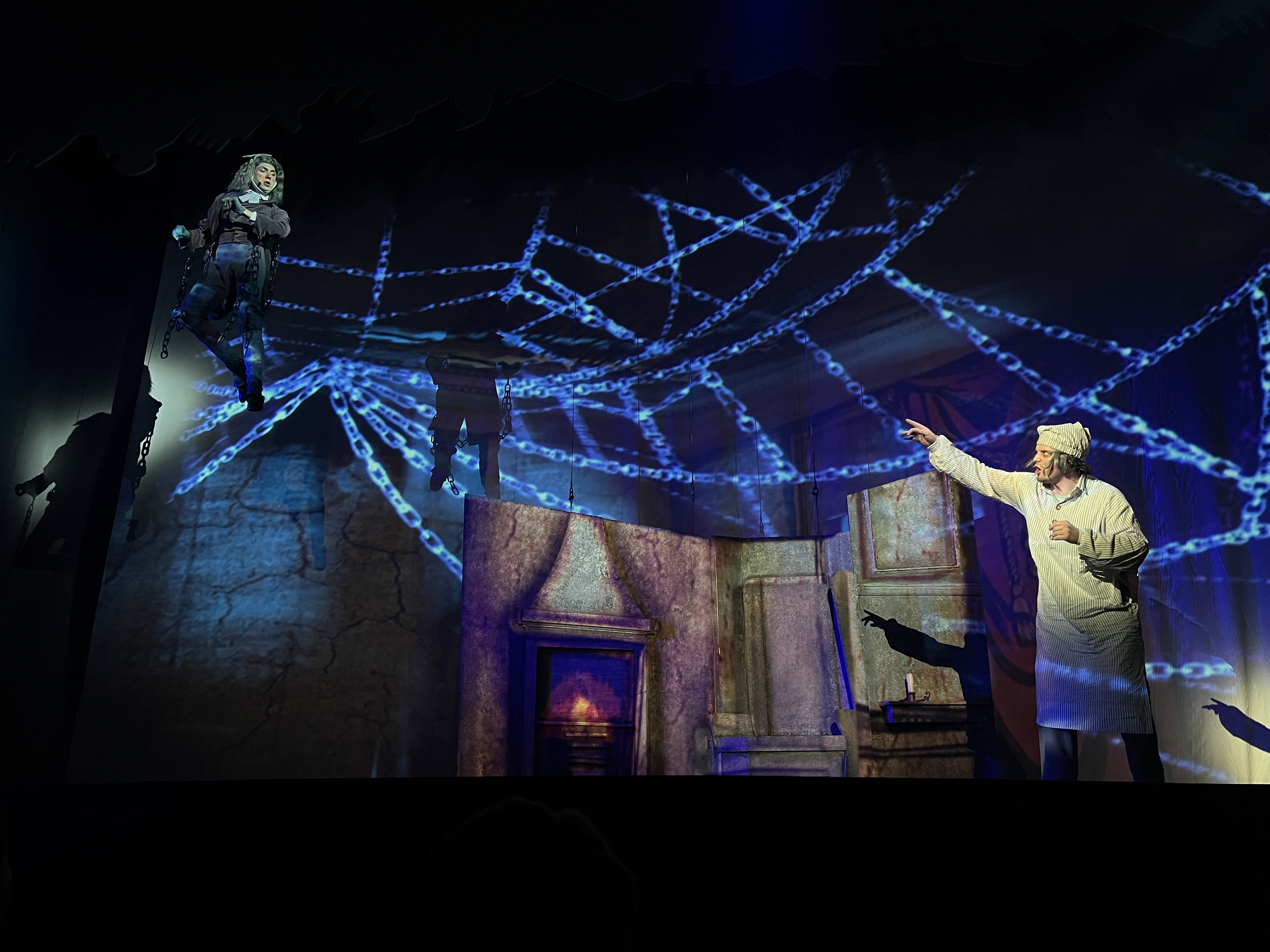
    A performance of Scrooge No More! (2014 - present) at the Globe Theatre.
  - Scrooge No More! – Christmas Town original musical written by Broadway's Alan Zachary and Michael Weiner, based on A Christmas Carol. Despite being announced in mid-2014 as a musical following "washed-up rockstar Eddie Kneezer," these plans were quietly abandoned in favor of a traditional abridgment of the novella with a rock score.
  - England Carolers – Opening day Christmas Town vocal quartet performing Christmas songs outside the Globe. The show is scheduled in conjunction with Scrooge, allowing it to become an indoor pre-show in inclement weather.

=== Heatherdowns (Scotland) ===
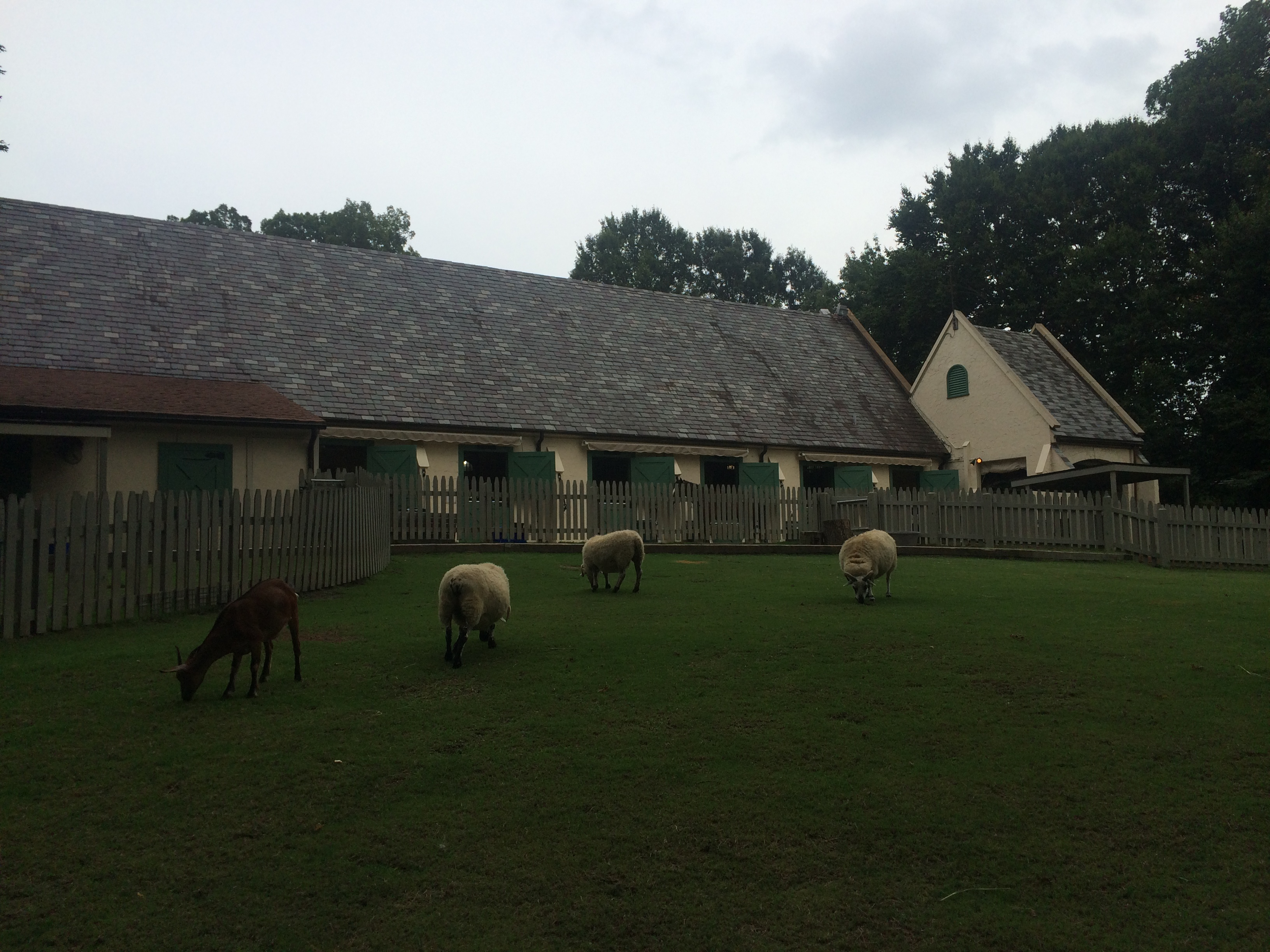
Backfield view of Heatherdowns, Scotland

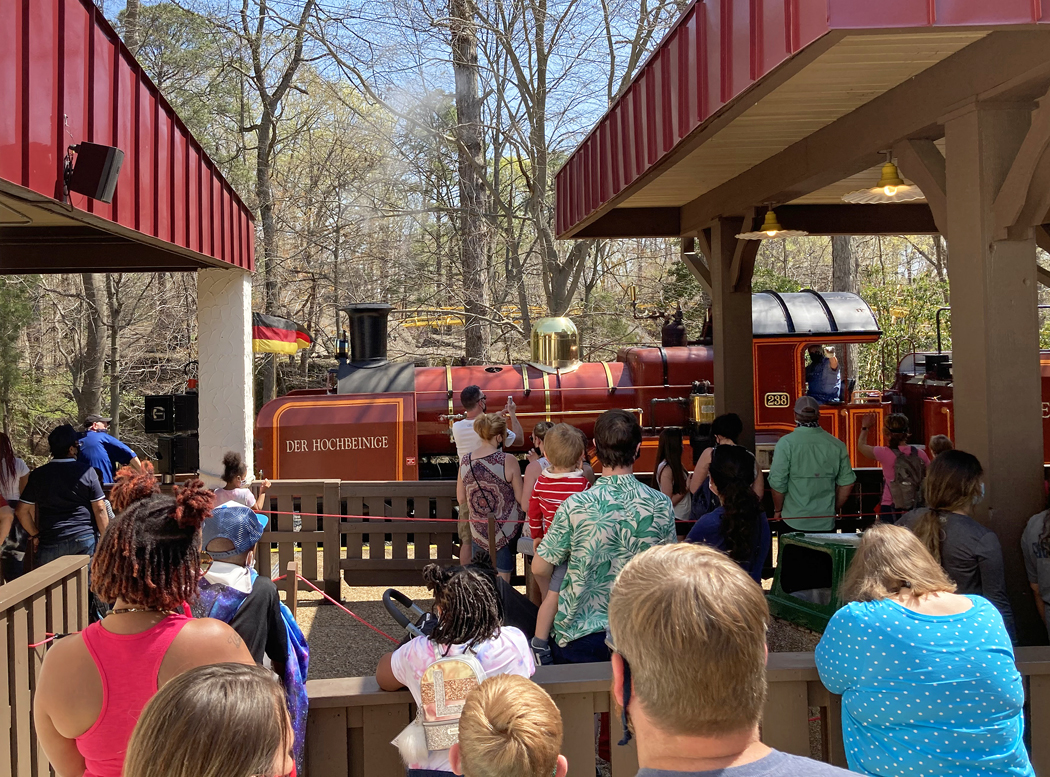
Tweedside railway station in the Heatherdowns (Scotland) hamlet at Busch Gardens Williamsburg.

Heatherdowns is a Scottish hamlet situated at the top of the hill on the path leading from Banbury Cross (the park's English hamlet). Tweedside Train Station offers a 20-minute ride through the park with additional stops in Festa Italia and at Caribou Station, in New France. Tweedside Gifts is located adjacent to the train station. Heatherdowns is also home to the Highland Stables featuring Scottish Blackface sheep, Border Collies and Clydesdales. Guests can interact with the animals and see them in action as they showcase their herding skills in daily demonstrations. Guests can also have pictures with the Clydesdales. Prior to 2010, the stables were home to several of the Anheuser-Busch Clydesdales until the theme park unit of Anheuser-Busch was sold in 2009.

- Loch Ness Monster – A looping Arrow Development roller coaster. It was the first and the only remaining roller coaster in the world to feature interlocking loops. It closed in 2023 to receive a makeover from Premier Rides.

=== Sesame Street Forest of Fun ===
Opened on April 3, 2009, Sesame Street Forest of Fun features four children and family rides and attractions themed to Sesame Street, as well as a stage, gift shop, and meet and greets. The hamlet also contains the Skyride station nearest to the Main Gate. The Aeronaut (first leg) of the Skyride departs to Aquitaine, France, while the Zeppelin (third leg) Skyride arrives from Rhinefeld, Germany.

On March 12, 2026, IP owners Sesame Workshop sued United Parks & Resorts to terminate their long-standing agreement with the company over "rogue, retaliatory actions" allegedly violating several contract agreements. The future of the hamlet is currently unknown.

- Prince Elmo's Castle – Small outdoor stage housing Sesame Street productions.
  - Sunny Days Celebration – Grover narrates the story of Prince Elmo; also featuring Cookie Monster, Abby Cadabby, and Zoe. As the show operates from Mardi Gras into the summer, it is the park's longest-running show in the calendar year. At times, Sesame characters may do solo shows.
  - Count's Countdown to Halloween – Halloween Spooktacular musical revue starring Count von Count, Elmo, Abby Cadabby, Cookie Monster, and Zoe.
  - Monster Game Show – Seasonal interactive show with live hosts.
  - Elmo's Christmas Wish – Christmas Town jukebox musical. Zoe, Rosita, Grover, and Cookie Monster express their wishes for the holiday season as Elmo tries to decide what his wish will be.
- Prince Elmo's Spire – A family-friendly shot-n-drop drop tower ride from Zamperla.
- Oscar's Whirly Worms – A rocking, spinning Rockin' Tug ride.
- Grover's Alpine Express – A Zierer family-friendly roller coaster standing 24 feet tall.
- Bert and Ernie's Loch Adventure – A flat flume ride with water effects. Relocated version of Land of the Dragons' Riffle Rapids ride.

=== Festa Italia (Italy) ===
Festa Italia is themed around a fair celebrating Marco Polo's return to Italy from his famous visit to China. It contains many of the park's midway games, all with a festival theme. Its attractions are themed around Roman mythology.

- Apollo's Chariot – The very first Bolliger & Mabillard Hyper Coaster featuring dives towards and around ponds and hills. Apollo's Chariot also features a deep purple and gold color scheme which is easily visible from the park entrance and surrounding parking lots.
- Tempesto – A Premier Rides Sky Rocket II, featuring three launches, an inline twist, and a non-inverting loop. It goes about 60 mph backward and forwards.
- Roman Rapids – An Intamin River Rapids ride among Roman ruins, which is deliberately designed to drench guests.
- Pantheon – An Intamin multi-launch coaster.
- The Trade Wind – A permanent-placement music express ride. During Christmas Town, this ride is named Snowman Summit.
- Turkish Delight – A variation of a teacups ride. During Christmas Town, this ride is named Peppermint Twist.
- Elephant Run – Another child-friendly music express ride. During Christmas Town, this ride is named Reindeer Run.

Festa Italia also includes the Festa Train Station of the Busch Gardens Railway.

=== San Marco (Italy) ===
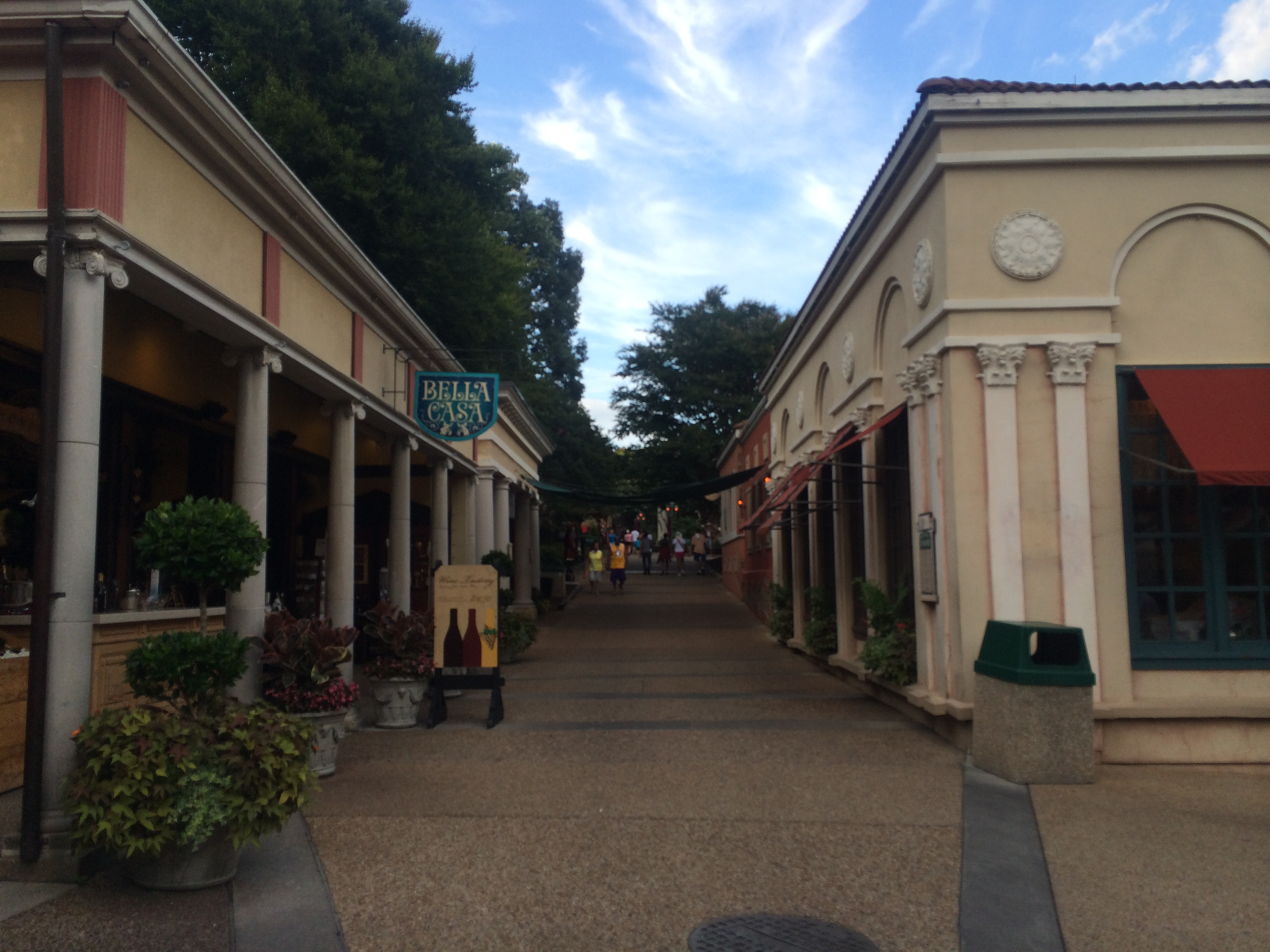
Street view of San Marco, Italy

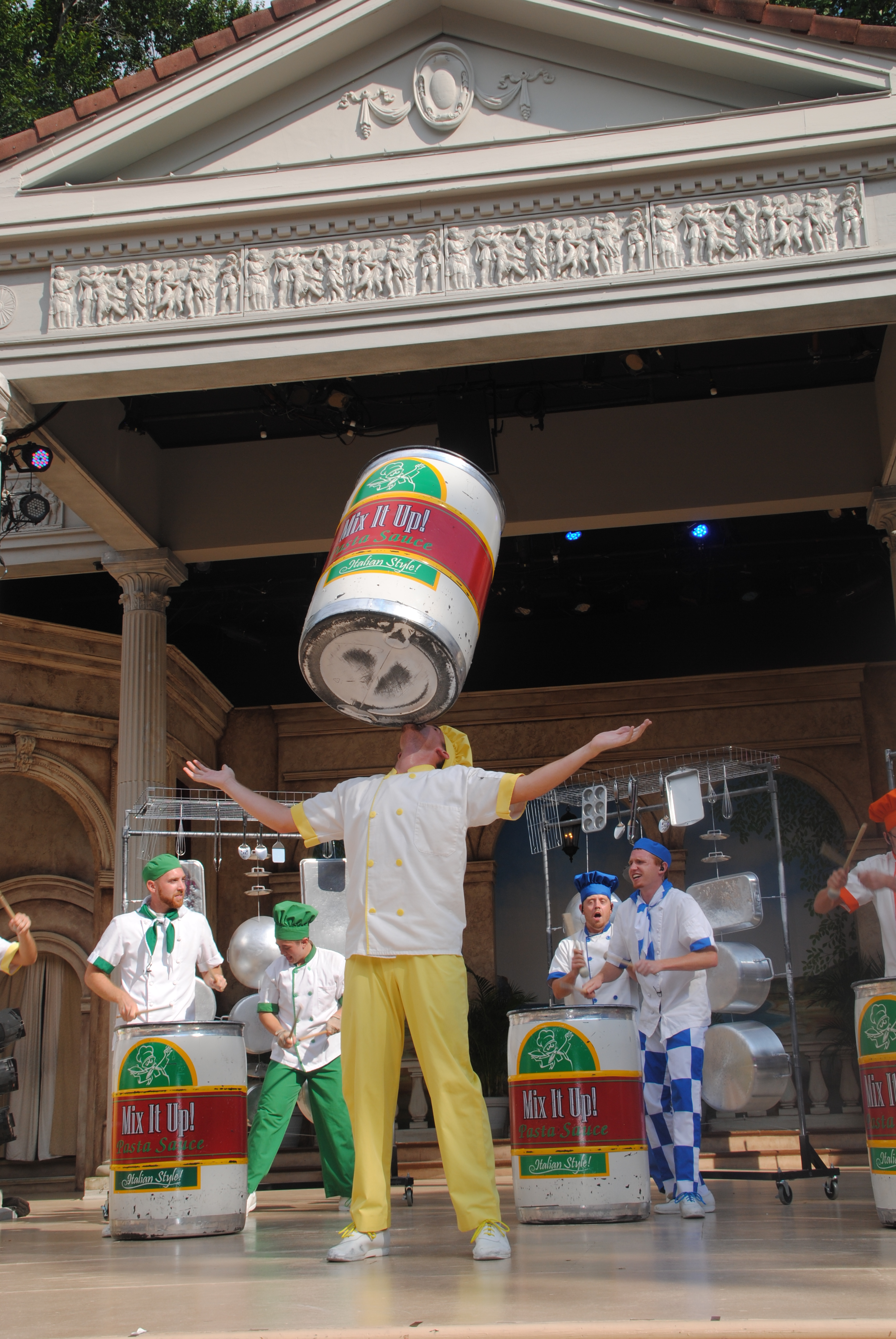
A performance of Mix It Up! (2011–2018) at Il Teatro di San Marco.

When Italy/San Marco was opened, it completed the outer circle walkway around Busch Gardens. Part of the park's expansion included a high pedestrian bridge across the Rhine River into Oktoberfest, Germany. San Marco is based upon Renaissance era Italy. A prominent feature within San Marco is Da Vinci's Garden of Inventions. This garden features Italian statues and flowers set amid rides based on sketches by Leonardo da Vinci. Also in the area is Marco Polo's Marketplace, featuring Italian, Mediterranean, and Asian dining at Il Teatro Di San Marco, an outdoor performance venue. Entertainment in the area features small groups of singers, often with live accompaniment.

- Escape from Pompeii – A shoot-the-chutes boat ride featuring an extensive indoor portion within the city of Pompeii, featuring fire and water effects as well as falling statues to simulate the destruction of the city. Though the ride is part of San Marco, it is located between the entrances to Forest of Fun and Festa Italia on the park's walking path.
  - During Howl-O-Scream, the ride's interior becomes a haunted house.
  - During Christmas Town, the ride's exterior becomes the Polar Pathway light display.
- Little Gliders & Little Balloons – Kiddie-sized carnival rides themed to Da Vinci's inventions.
- The Battering Ram – A high-capacity, high-thrill swinging ship. This does not go upside down.
- Il Teatro Di San Marco – Outdoor dinner theater directly adjacent to Marco Polo's Marketplace.
  - Encore on Bourbon Street – Mardi Gras vocal quartet. Revamp of former vocal duo Bourbon Street Brigade, featuring a live band.
  - Sounds of San Marco – Solo singing act with live musicians. As of 2025, two different sets are played depending on the time of day.
  - Undead Diva – Upcoming Howl-O-Scream jukebox musical. Undead singer Vita Von Vault performs a concert while trying to uncover the mystery of her own murder.
  - Wisemen – Christmas Town musical act. Features a Rat Pack-inspired tenor trio singing Christmas and Christian songs.

=== Oktoberfest (Bavaria, Germany) ===
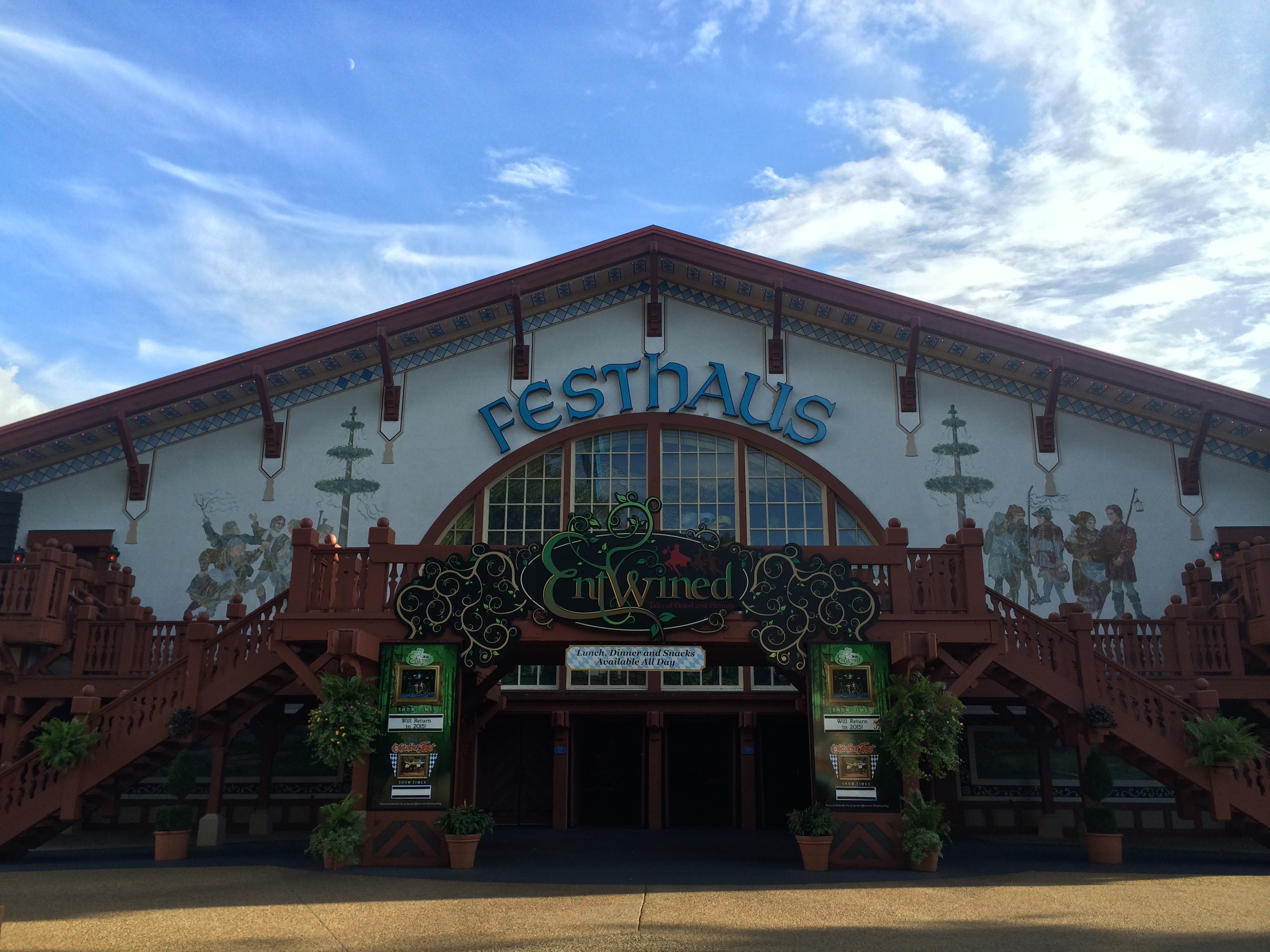
Das Festhaus in Oktoberfest, site of live performances, shops, and eateries.

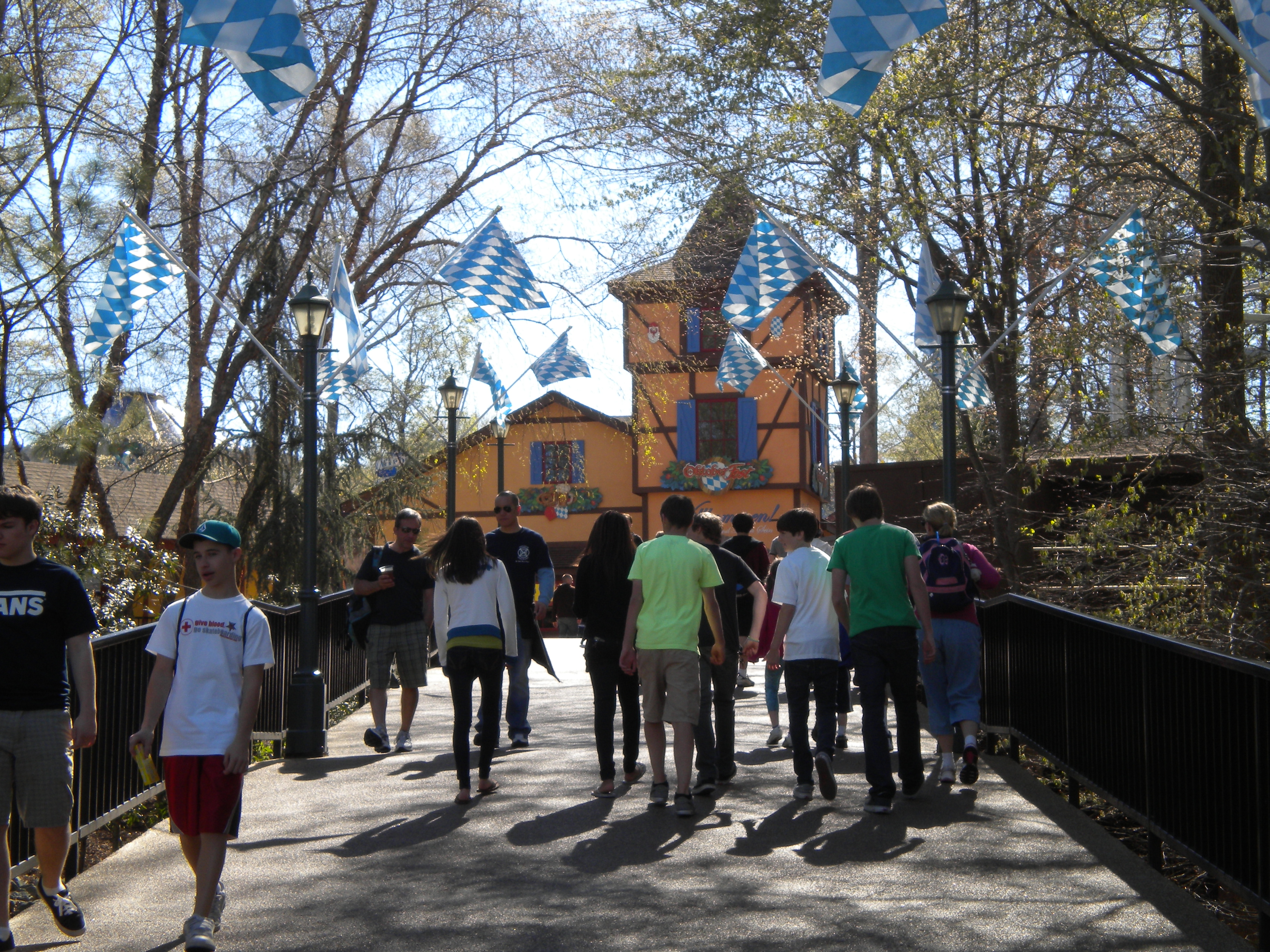
Beste Brezeln und Bier as viewed from the Oktoberfest bridge from San Marco.

Like Rhinefeld, this section is based on Germany during the annual celebration of Oktoberfest. Oktoberfest features many of the park's flat rides. It is also home to a large assortment of carnival-style games. Das Festhaus is a large, air-conditioned eating facility where guests can purchase German food or American classics. While eating in Das Festhaus, guests can experience shows that rotate throughout the year. For several decades, this included the park's longest-running show, This is Oktoberfest, which began with the area's debut in 1976, as well as Fiends in the Festhaus, the first Howl-O-Scream show.

This section of the park formerly hosted The Big Bad Wolf, an Arrow Dynamics suspended roller coaster. The Big Bad Wolf was closed on September 7, 2009, though a spiritual successor, Big Bad Wolf: The Wolf's Revenge, would be erected behind the Festhaus and opened on May 23, 2025.

On September 18, 2010, it was announced that Oktoberfest would be heavily renovated for 2011, including a Moser's Rides 246-foot (75 m) Roto-Drop called Mäch Tower, which was a drop tower-observation tower hybrid that closed in 2023. An additional major renovation was made within Das Festhaus, replacing its iconic rising gazebo stage with a smaller traverse stage for a new fairy tale musical, Entwined, which would replace This is Oktoberfest. Though seating was expanded inside the venue, Entwined and the transition into modern summer entertainment was short-lived. Also announced was a new Zierer ESC roller coaster that opened in the spring of 2012 on the former site of The Big Bad Wolf. In September 2011, it was announced that the new coaster would be called Verbolten. The ride officially opened to the general public on May 18, 2012. On November 8, 2025, it was announced that Verbolten would be reimagined as Verbolten: Forbidden Turn. The ride's original version closed for renovation on January 4, 2026 and reopened as Verbolten: Forbidden Turn on May 30, 2026.

The area also hosts a large part of the annual BierFest festival, which features a number of beers from around the world, with at least 22 different beers on tap throughout the whole area. German-themed food and non-alcoholic beverages are also sold during the festival. A tap room offering specialized alcoholic drinks, the Brauhaus Craft Beer Room and Stein Club, was opened inside the Festhaus on March 19, 2016.

The area also contained the trackless dark ride Curse of DarKastle. The attraction opened on May 1, 2005, and closed on September 4, 2017, to make way for a temporary Howl-O-Scream maze, Frostbite. On January 23, 2018, it was announced that Curse of DarKastle would not reopen for the 2018 season and would be officially closing for being a burden with maintenance costs. The building that harbored the dark ride was used as event space, such as Santa's workshop for Christmas Town and a walkthrough maze for Howl-O-Scream 2021. On September 6, 2022, it was announced that a new Intamin Family Launch Straddle Coaster named DarKoaster: Escape The Storm would open in the space during Spring 2023. DarKoaster opened to the public on May 19, 2023, as North America’s first all-indoor straddle coaster.

- Verbolten: Forbidden Turn – A family-style, Black Forest themed launched roller coaster with a top speed of 53 mph. It also has a free fall when the track drops vertically while staying on a horizontal plane.
- Der Autobahn – Bumper cars
- Der Autobahn Jr. – Kiddie bumper cars
- Der Roto Baron – Red Baron
- Der Wirbelwind (Waveswinger) – classic yo-yo swings ride
- Big Bad Wolf: The Wolf's Revenge – Steel roller coaster with a top speed of 40 mph. It is the spiritual successor to the original Big Bad Wolf.
- Das Festhaus – Large indoor dining venue with live entertainment on a traverse stage, often featuring live musicians and guest acts. Spring and summer offerings reflect the Oktoberfest tradition, while Howl-O-Scream and Christmas Town offerings explore more modern entertainment.
  - New Orleans Brass Jazz Band – Mardi Gras musical revue featuring two singers and a seven-piece jazz band.
  - During the St. Patrick's Day Celebration and at the end of the summer, Broken Turnstiles moves into the space.
  - Oom-Pah Band – Small cast musical comedy revue featuring traditional German songs, accompanied by a live band.
  - We Are Oktoberfest – Spiritual successor to This is Oktoberfest, created to celebrate the park's 50th anniversary. Led by a Bürgermeister emulating the former show's long-time host, "Bürgermeister Bob" Bauman, features eight live dancers and a six-piece band.
  - Skeletones in Your Closet – Hard rock Howl-O-Scream jukebox musical based on the "Skeletones," a group of singing and dancing skeletons first seen in Italy's 2021 show, Skeletones. A young girl, Annie, wakes up to find the Skeletones in her room on a night when the Veil, the layer between worlds, is particularly thin. She learns that when the Veil breaks, things crawl through.
  - The Witching Hour – Howl-O-Scream nightly opening ceremony led by event icon Jack. Performed in front of the venue.
  - Celebration of Lights at O'Tannenbaum – Opening day Christmas Town tree light display, placed in front of the venue.
  - During Christmas Town preview member events, the Merry Misfits band performs in the space one week prior to the event's official preview weekends.
  - Christmas Town Live! A Holiday Special – Christmas Town musical revue themed to the live broadcast of WBGW, a fictional 1960s television station.
- Black Forest Picnic Area – Outdoor eating area used to host various groups and special events.
- DarKoaster: Escape The Storm — Indoor straddle coaster themed to settings and characters from the building's former inhabitant, Curse of DarKastle.

=== Rhinefeld (Rhineland Germany) ===
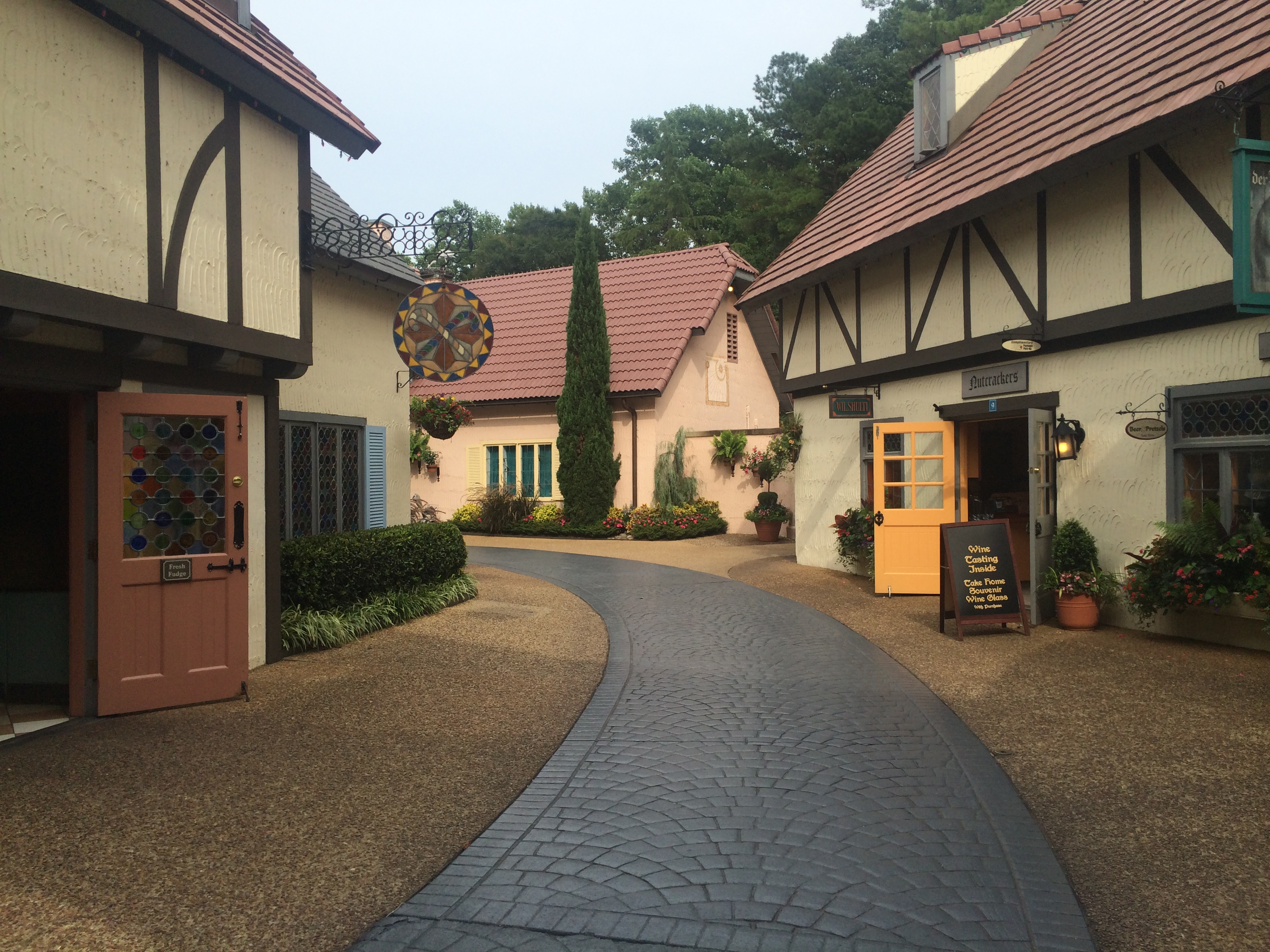
A street view of Rhinefeld, Germany

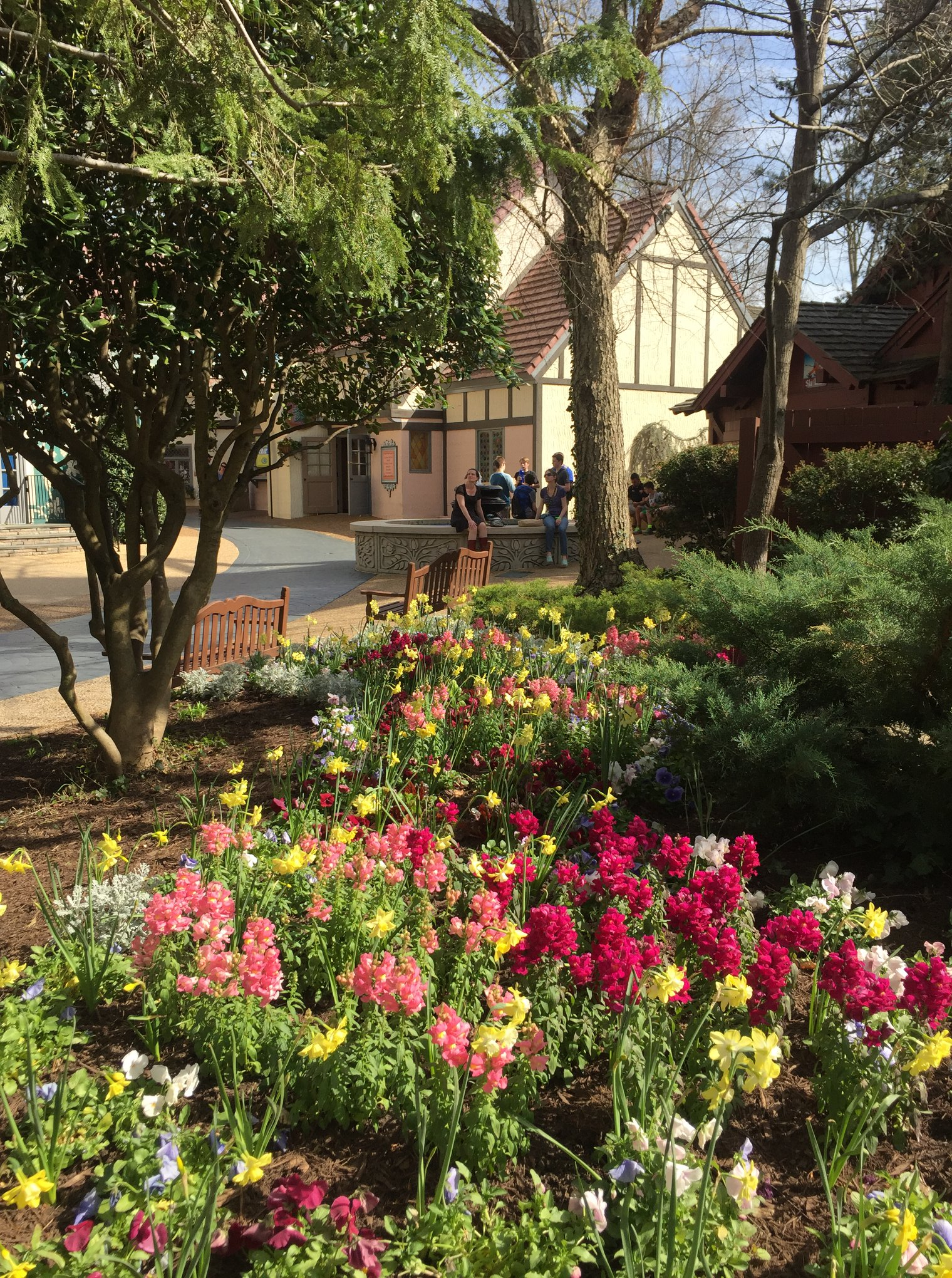
Rhinefeld in the spring.

This section is based on the country of Germany. It is largely themed to a runaway ski resort in the German Alps. The third leg of Busch Gardens' Skyride arrives and departs from this section.

- Bürgermeister's Hideaway – Former paid cocktail dining experience with seasonal, year-round variants. Set inside a candy shop's hidden speakeasy, the premise was centered around the Rhinefeld's Bürgermeister and his family's secret identity: Germans who don't like beer. Following multiple years of the characters performing in both show and atmospheric capacity, the bar was made open to the public. Although the show was discontinued, its characters remain in the facility.
- Alpengeist – A Bolliger & Mabillard inverted roller coaster. It is themed to a ski-lift taken over by a local legend, the Alpengeist (German for "Ghost of the Alps"). In addition to its cyan and white Alpine color scheme, the station of Alpengeist features ski gear and other decorations to simulate a ski lodge in the Alps. This ride inverts riders six times.
- Kinder Karussel – The park's antique Herschell Carousel.

==== Land of the Dragons ====
Sub-area of Rhinefeld. When it opened in 1994 (replacing the former Grimms Hollow children's area), Land of the Dragons was the main kiddie area at Busch Gardens. It is home to Dumpherey the Dragon, the area's mascot. Other major attractions within Land of the Dragons include its dragon-themed 3-story tree house, a wet play area with waterfalls, squirting geysers, and a serpent that inhabits the area. There are also smaller play zones and wet play areas.

Despite once housing live entertainment including kid-friendly Howl-O-Scream productions and a tie-in to the 1997 version of Captain Kangaroo, entertainment has been phased out in this area.

- Flutter Splutter – A flying dragon ride.
- Chug-A-Tug – A boat ride.
- Bug-A-Dug – A music express-like ride with ladybug cars that are red and yellow.
- Tree House & Climbing Nets
- Brook – A wet play area

The former Dragon Digs gift shop was converted into the park's Lost Children building, relocated from New France. The ride Riffle Rapids was relocated to Sesame Street Forest of Fun as Bert and Ernie's Loch Adventure.

=== New France (French Colonial) ===
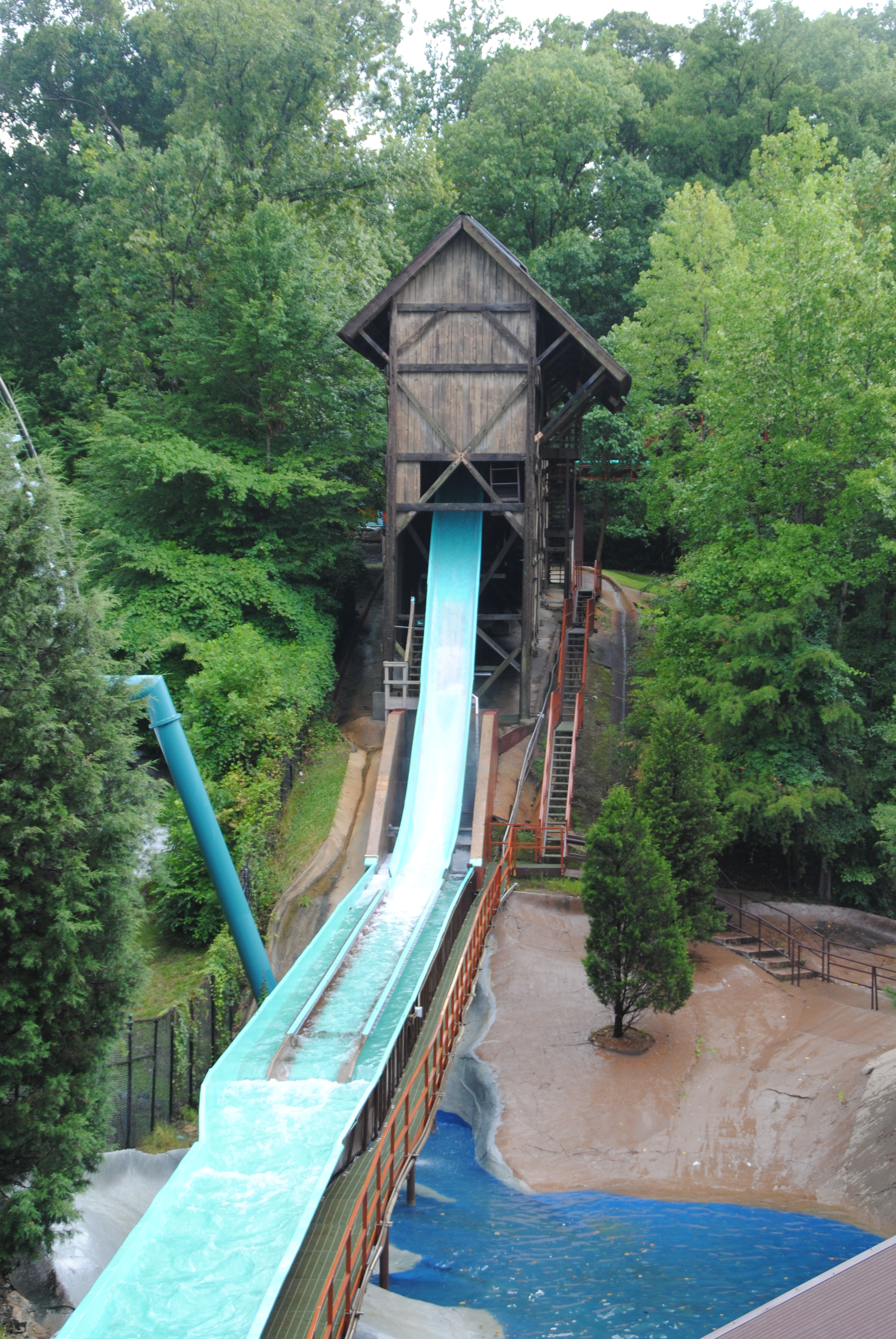
The Final Plunge of Le Scoot Log Flume in New France.

New France presents a unique shopping experience that showcases the French colonial influence in Canada, featuring a range of stores with merchandise that complements the overall colonial theme. Rides in New France include the Busch Gardens Railway departing from Caribou Station and the Le Scoot Log Flume, featuring a 50-foot (15 m) plunge through a sawmill. A predominant feature in this area is the Trappers Smokehouse, which has an outdoor grill centrally located. Trappers Smokehouse offers grilled and smoked items such as chicken, turkey legs, ribs, and beef brisket.

- Le Scoot Log Flume – Traditional high-in-the-sky theme park log flume.
- Le Catapult – Basic carnival scrambler. Opening day attraction, originally located inside the building now known as Castle O'Sullivan.
- InvadR – Great Coasters International wooden roller coaster. InvadR is themed around the Viking invasion of New France. It has 9 airtime hills, a 74-foot drop and goes up to 48 mph.

The area once included the Canadian Palladium performance venue, notable for introducing the park's American Jukebox and Monster Stomp IP. In 2010, the venue would be closed and demolished.

=== Aquitaine (France) ===
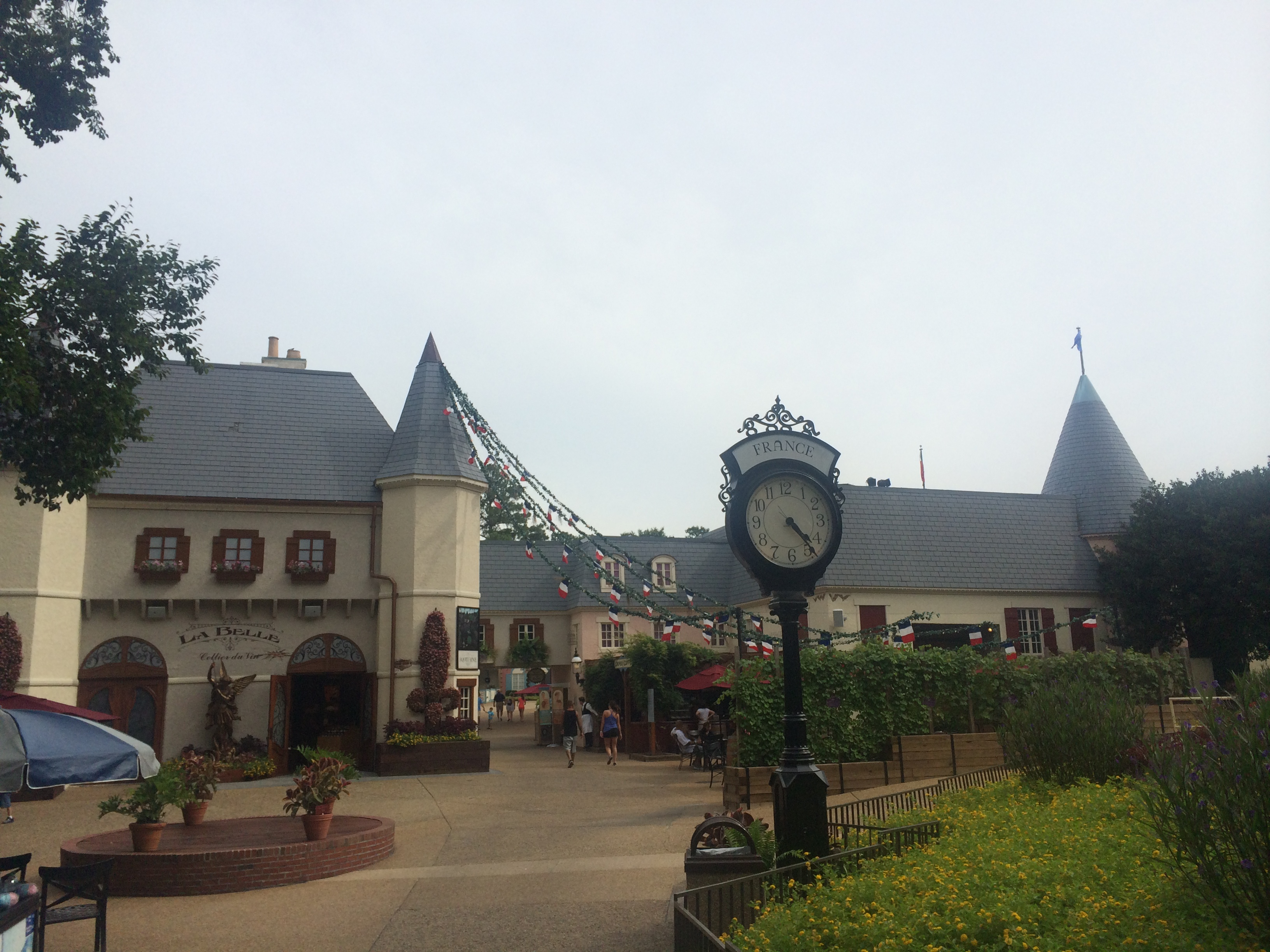
Entering Aquitaine, France in 2014

This section, centered on the village of Aquitaine, is based on Belle Époque France. It is home to many boutiques and one of the park's Skyride stations, where the first leg of the Skyride arrives from England and the second leg departs for Rhinefeld, Germany. The Royal Palace Theatre in France hosts numerous shows throughout the season.

- Aquitaine Stage – Small concert stage set against the backdrop of the Griffon.
  - The King's Krewe Festival – Interactive Mardi Gras experience with the King and Queen of Mardi Gras and their jesters.
  - Broken Turnstiles & Merry Misfits – Live bands for spring/summer and Christmas Town operations, respectively.
    - During both the St. Patrick's Day Celebration (prior to the opening of Oom-Pah Band) and at the end of the summer (following the end of We Are Oktoberfest), Broken Turnstiles is moved into Das Festhaus in Germany.
    - Merry Misfits performs in Das Festhaus during the annual Christmas Town members-only preview event, taking place one week before the event's official preview weekends.
  - Monster Street Party – Halloween Spooktacular interactive dance show hosted by Howl-O-Scream icon Jack.
- Griffon – A Bolliger & Mabillard dive roller coaster, named after the legendary creature, the griffin; contains a ninety-degree drop from 205 feet, 2 Immelmann loops, and a "splashdown" finale; the brother ride of Busch Gardens Tampa Bay's SheiKra.
- Royal Palace Theatre – Outdoor stadium-seating performance venue. Though it hosted in-house productions throughout the park's history, including the original musical All for One, it became a concert-only venue outside of Christmas Town operations. A reboot of the former summer show Kinetix was announced for the venue for summer 2026, marking the first time in nearly a decade that the Royal Palace would be used for a new production.
  - Busch Gardens Concert Series – Annual summer concert series.
  - Kinetix: A New Generation – Revival of Kinetix, a nighttime musical revue featuring singers, dancers, and live stunts.
  - 'Twas That Night – Ice skating show with original songs, retelling the story of 'Twas the Night Before Christmas.

=== Killarney (Ireland) ===
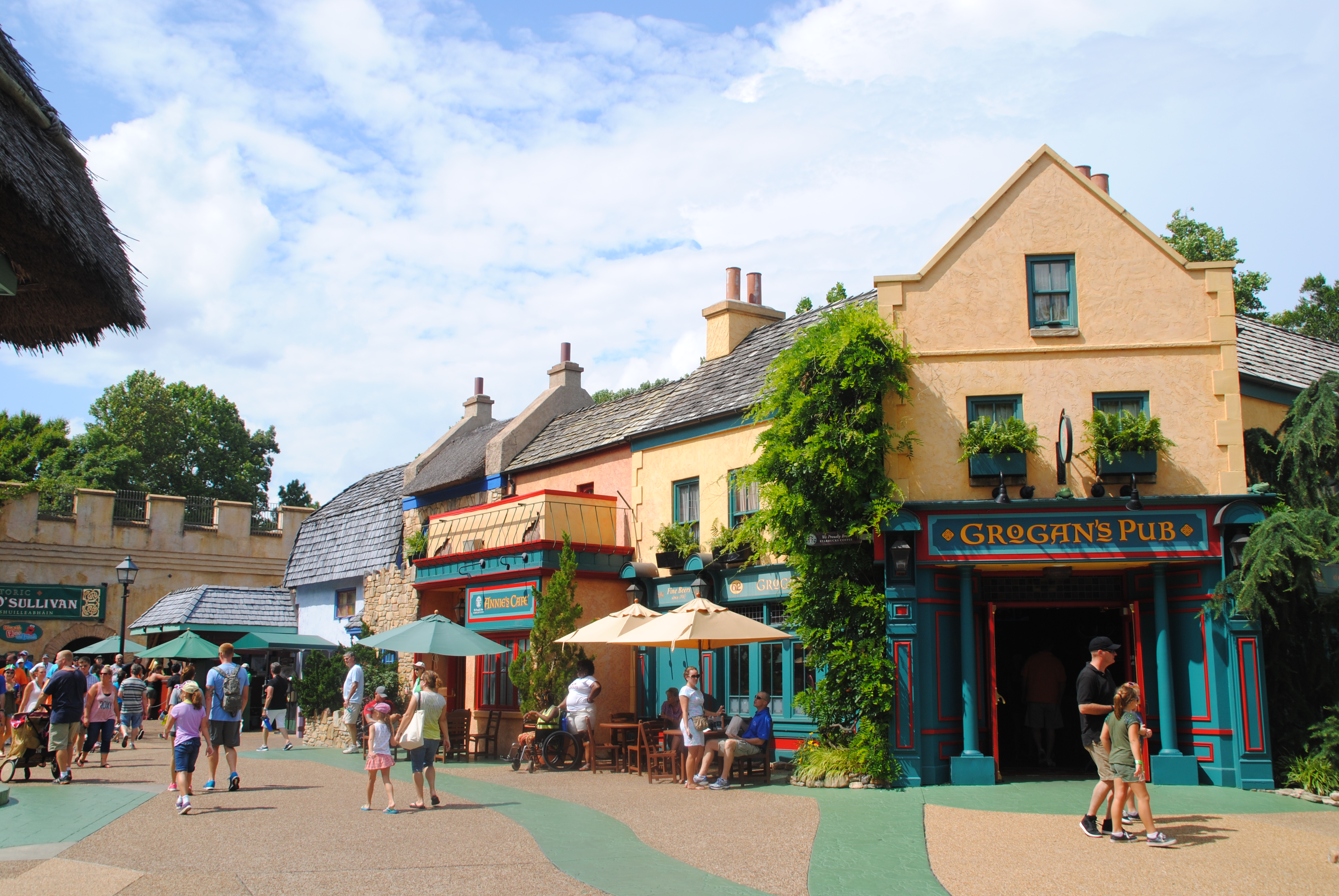
2014 street view of Killarney, Ireland.

Formerly known as Hastings, England, this section of the park was re-themed in 2001 as Ireland, the first new country in over 20 years. Following the addition of this country, the park's attendance was reportedly boosted by 17% after the 2001 grand opening, and was awarded a top prize by the Themed Entertainment Association. This area features Celtic Fyre, at the Abbey Stone Theatre, a celebration of Irish dance. In 2021, Celtic Fyre was named the number one Best Amusement Park Entertainment by USA Today, adding to the collection of awards and praise already collected by Busch Gardens Williamsburg over the years. Grogan's Grill offers Irish cuisine and occasional live entertainment in this area.

Outside the gateway next to Castle O'Sullivan, the walkway makes a sharp left turn and begins a long, moderately steep climb toward Aquitaine, France. Several animal sanctuaries and two animal performance theaters are situated along this path. Originally named Jack Hanna's Wild Reserve when it opened in 2000, the animal sanctuary was considered its own section of the park, but in 2017 the Wild Reserve was merged with Killarney and renamed the Jack Hanna Trail. This name has since fallen out of use.

- Lorikeet Glen – A covered bird sanctuary for Lorikeets and other brightly colored birds. Guests can enter and the birds will approach and land on them. Cups of nectar, used to help attract the birds, are available for purchase in the entrance gift shop.
- Eagle Ridge, Wolf Valley, & Birds of Prey – Animal exhibits located outside the village.
- Castle O'Sullivan – Building that originally housed the ride The Catapult, currently residing in New France. Transitioned into a performance venue with the cult classic show The Enchanted Laboratory of Nostramos the Magnificent and its successor, Secrets of Castle O'Sullivan. Later hosted several paid dining shows including spin-offs of Celtic Fyre, Fiends, and the Sesame Street IP. The facility now only houses one show.
  - Santa's Fireside Feast – Opening day Christmas Town buffet-style dinner theater with Santa Claus and his elves. Santa is available for a photo opportunity prior to a reading of 'Twas the Night Before Christmas.
- Abbey Stone Theatre – Performance venue currently housing Celtic Fyre. Before the transition to Ireland and shows based around Irish dance, the Magic Lantern Theatre began as a puppet theater, housing shows developed by Sid & Marty Krofft and Bill Baird. In the 1980s and 1990s, it housed several high-production musical revues including Totally Television, a celebration of television shows hosted by a pre-recorded Dick Van Dyke.
  - Celtic Fyre – Award-winning Irish dance and American tap show. At an Irish inn, a wedding party shares in Celtic tradition under the watch of the Innkeeper. Operates from St. Patrick's Day Celebration into the summer.
  - Fiends – Third revival of the chain's first Howl-O-Scream show, Fiends in the Festhaus. In an adult-oriented jukebox musical lampooning the year's pop culture moments, Doctor Freakenstein and his assistant Igor participate in ridiculous experiments with help from various iconic monsters. During the event, the Ireland hamlet is themed to Freakenstein's lab.
    - The show's ensemble, a group of sexy nurses with pink bobs, provide additional comedic moments and technically skilled dancing. The nurses have become Howl-O-Scream icons across both Williamsburg and Tampa, appearing across social media and in-park merchandise. For the 2025 event, a Zombie Nurse inspired by the show debuted in Oktoberfest's Bavarian Bloodshed "terror-tory."
  - Gloria! – Modern gospel retelling of the Nativity, led by the Angel Gabriel. The show originally ran from 2011 to 2019, returning in 2023.
- Killarney Village Stage – Outdoor stage in the middle of the hamlet, serving as a point of focus for street shows.
  - The Big Easy Bash – Mardi Gras street show featuring dancers, stilt walkers, and percussionists.
  - Killarney's Silver Celebration – St. Patrick's Day Celebration street show produced for the hamlet's 25th anniversary in 2026.
- Return to Corkscrew Hill – Upcoming 2027 reimagining of former motion simulator attraction Corkscrew Hill.
- Finnegan's Flyer – S&S Sansei Screamin' Swing opened in the spring of 2019. The ride swings guests at 80 feet at 45 mph.

The area also houses the Pet Shenanigans Theater, a vacant performance venue that hosted animal shows of the same name until the park's temporary COVID-19 pandemic closure.

== Roller coasters ==
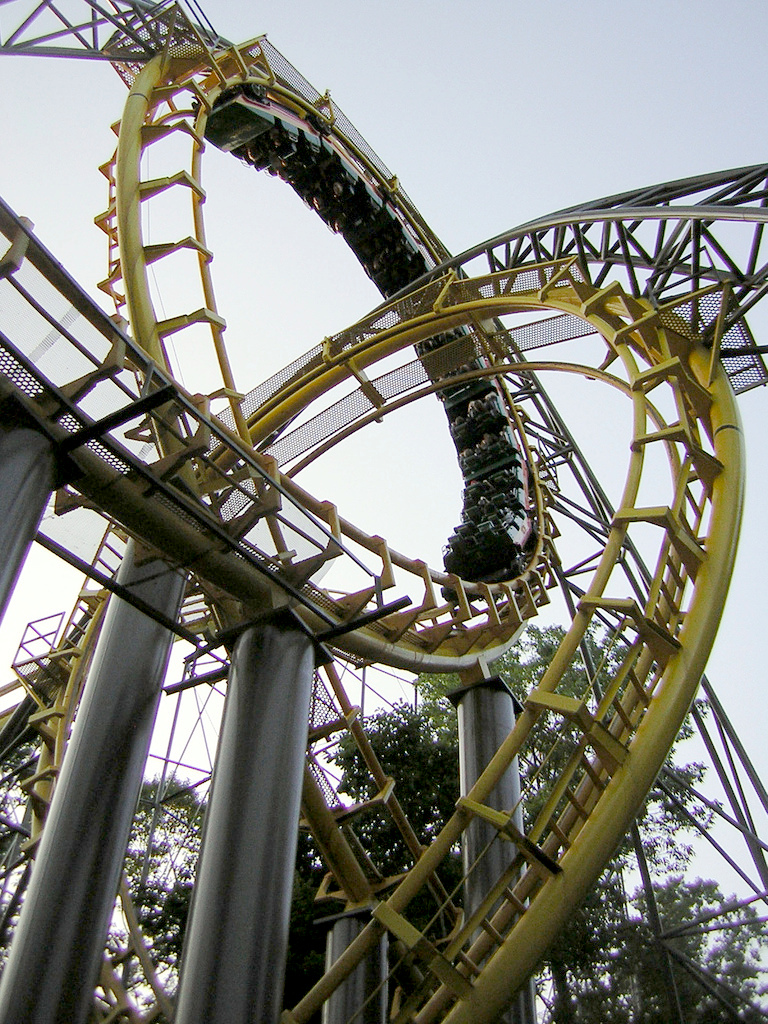
The Loch Ness Monster's interlocking loops

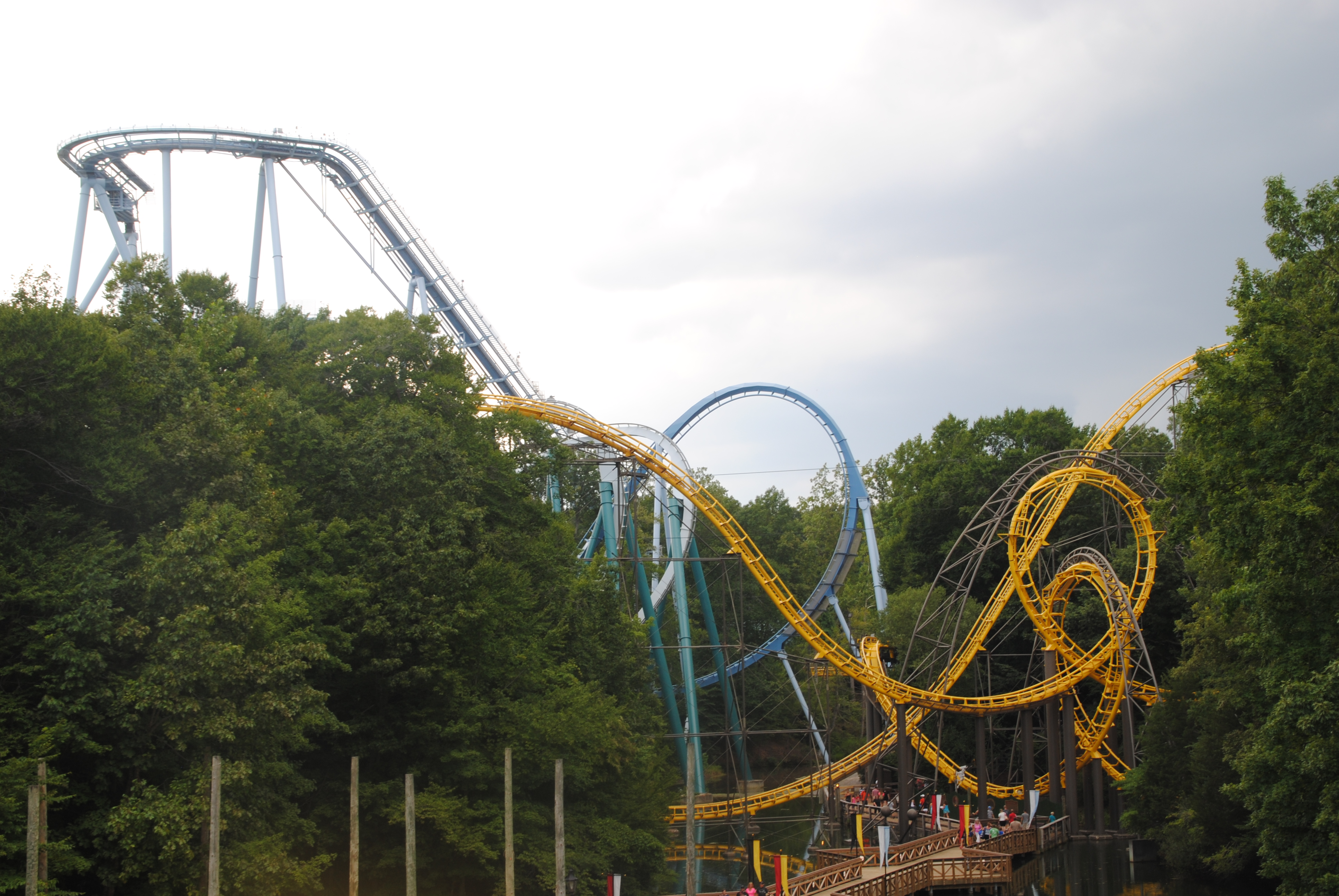
Griffon, Alpengeist, and Loch Ness Monster roller coasters shown in close proximity.

=== Existing (listed by first year) ===
Name	Manufacturer	Type	Opened
Loch Ness Monster	Arrow Development	Custom Looper	1978
Alpengeist	Bolliger & Mabillard (B&M)	Inverted Coaster	1997
Apollo's Chariot	Bolliger & Mabillard (B&M)	Hyper Coaster	1999
Griffon	Bolliger & Mabillard (B&M)	Dive Coaster	2007
Grover's Alpine Express	Zierer	Force 190 Coaster	2009
Verbolten: Forbidden Turn	Zierer	ESC Coaster	2012
Tempesto	Premier Rides	Sky Rocket II	2015
InvadR	Great Coasters International (GCI)	Wooden Coaster	2017
Pantheon	Intamin	LSM Launch Coaster	2022
DarKoaster: Escape The Storm	Intamin	Family Launch Straddle Coaster	2023
Big Bad Wolf: The Wolf's Revenge	Bolliger & Mabillard (B&M)	Family Inverted Coaster	2025

=== Defunct ===
Name	Manufacturer	Type	Opened	Closed	Replaced By
Die Wildkatze (German for The Wildcat)	Schwarzkopf	Wildcat	1976	1983	Big Bad Wolf
Das Kätzchen (German for The Kitten)	Allan Herschell Company	Little Dipper	1976	1984	
Glissade	Schwarzkopf	Jet Star – Jumbo Jet	1975	1985	Wild Maus
Drachen Fire	Arrow Dynamics	Custom Looper	1992	1998	Big Bad Wolf: The Wolf’s Revenge
Wild Maus	Mack Rides	Steel – Wild Mouse	1996	2003	Curse of DarKastle (DarKoaster: Escape the Storm)
Big Bad Wolf	Arrow Dynamics	Suspended Coaster	1984	2009	Verbolten

== Entertainment ==
Event	Name	Performance Space	Opened	Replaced
Mardi Gras Late January to Late March	Sunny Days Celebration	Sesame Street Forest of Fun	2009	
Mardi Gras Late January to Late March	New Orleans Brass Jazz Band	Das Festhaus, Oktoberfest	2021	Festhaus Varieté: Comedic Jugglers
Mardi Gras Late January to Late March	Carnaval Imaginique (Carnaval Imaginique: A Golden Jubilee Spectacular)	Globe Theatre, England	2022	
Mardi Gras Late January to Late March	The Big Easy Bash	Killarney Village, Ireland	2026	Mardi Street Party (Ireland)
Mardi Gras Late January to Late March	Encore on Bourbon Street	Il Teatro Di San Marco, Italy	2026	revamp of Bourbon Street Brigade
Mardi Gras Late January to Late March	The King's Krewe Festival	Aquitaine, France	2026	
St. Patrick's Day Celebration March	Celtic Fyre	Abbey Stone Theatre, Ireland	2010	Emerald Beat
St. Patrick's Day Celebration March	Sunny Days Celebration	Sesame Street Forest of Fun	2009	
St. Patrick's Day Celebration March	Broken Turnstiles (extension)	Das Festhaus, Oktoberfest	2026	Dublin Over
St. Patrick's Day Celebration March	Killarney's Silver Celebration	Killarney Village, Ireland	2026	Killarney Village Celebration
St. Patrick's Day Celebration March	Sounds of San Marco (extension)	Il Teatro Di San Marco, Italy	2026	Trio di Roma
Kids' Weekends Late March to Late April	Celtic Fyre	Abbey Stone Theatre, Ireland	2010	Emerald Beat
Kids' Weekends Late March to Late April	Sunny Days Celebration	Sesame Street Forest of Fun	2010	
Kids' Weekends Late March to Late April	Oom-Pah Band	Das Festhaus, Oktoberfest	2021	OktoberZest (partial)
Kids' Weekends Late March to Late April	Broken Turnstiles (extension)		2026	Dublin Over
Kids' Weekends Late March to Late April	Sounds of San Marco (extension)	Il Teatro Di San Marco, Italy	2026	Trio di Roma
Kids' Weekends Late March to Late April	When the Pages Turn	Globe Theatre, England	2026	Sesame Street: Let's Play Together!
Food & Wine Festival Late April to Late June	Celtic Fyre	Abbey Stone Theatre, Ireland	2010	Emerald Beat
Food & Wine Festival Late April to Late June	Sunny Days Celebration	Sesame Street Forest of Fun	2010	
Food & Wine Festival Late April to Late June	We Are Oktoberfest	Das Festhaus, Oktoberfest	2025	OktoberZest; second revival of This is Oktoberfest
Summer of Wonder Late June to Late July	Celtic Fyre	Abbey Stone Theatre, Ireland	2010	Emerald Beat
Summer of Wonder Late June to Late July	Sunny Days Celebration	Sesame Street Forest of Fun	2010	
Summer of Wonder Late June to Late July	Sounds of San Marco (daytime set)	Il Teatro Di San Marco, Italy	2023	Bel Concertino
Summer of Wonder Late June to Late July	We Are Oktoberfest	Das Festhaus, Oktoberfest	2025	OktoberZest; second revival of This is Oktoberfest
Summer of Wonder Late June to Late July	Broken Turnstiles	Aquitaine, France	2025	Abbey Taverns
Summer of Wonder Late June to Late July	Sounds of San Marco (nighttime set)	Il Teatro Di San Marco, Italy	2025	
Summer of Wonder Late June to Late July	Across the Pond: Legends of the UK	Globe Theatre, England	2026	American Jukebox: Summer Remix
Summer of Wonder Late June to Late July	Summer of Wonder Drone Show		2026	
Summer of Wonder Late June to Late July	Kinetix: A New Generation	Royal Palace Theatre, France	2026	revival of Kinetix
Bier Fest Brews & BBQ August	Celtic Fyre	Abbey Stone Theatre, Ireland	2010	Emerald Beat
Bier Fest Brews & BBQ August	Sunny Days Celebration	Sesame Street Forest of Fun	2010	
Bier Fest Brews & BBQ August	Sounds of San Marco (daytime set)	Il Teatro Di San Marco, Italy	2023	Bel Concertino
Bier Fest Brews & BBQ August	We Are Oktoberfest	Das Festhaus, Oktoberfest	2025	OktoberZest; second revival of This is Oktoberfest
Bier Fest Brews & BBQ August	Broken Turnstiles	Aquitaine, France	2025	Abbey Taverns
Bier Fest Brews & BBQ August	Sounds of San Marco (nighttime set)	Il Teatro Di San Marco, Italy	2025	
Bier Fest Brews & BBQ August	Across the Pond: Legends of the UK	Globe Theatre, England	2026	American Jukebox: Summer Remix
Howl-O-Scream Early September to Early November	Monster Stomp on Ripper Row	Globe Theatre, England	2014	Pirates 4-D (2011); second revival of Monster Stomp
Howl-O-Scream Early September to Early November	Fiends (2024): Fiends: The FREAKquel; Fiends: First Contact; Fiends: Fatal Error	Abbey Stone Theatre, Ireland	2024	Jack is Back; third revival of Fiends in the Festhaus
Howl-O-Scream Early September to Early November	The Witching Hour	Oktoberfest	2024	revival of Jack's Haunting Hour
Howl-O-Scream Early September to Early November	Skeletones in Your Closet	Das Festhaus, Oktoberfest	2025	Phantoms of the Festhaus; revival of Skeletones
Howl-O-Scream Early September to Early November	Undead Diva	Il Teatro Di San Marco, Italy	2026	Spirit Spellabration
Howl-O-Scream Early September to Early November	Starfright Orchestra (two-day revival)	Globe Theatre, England	2026	
Halloween Spooktacular Late September to Early November	Count's Countdown to Halloween	Sesame Street Forest of Fun	2017	
Halloween Spooktacular Late September to Early November	Monster Game Show	Sesame Street Forest of Fun	2024	
Halloween Spooktacular Late September to Early November	Monster Street Party	Aquitaine, France	2024	
Christmas Town November to Early January	Celebration of Lights at O'Tannenbaum	Oktoberfest	2009	
Christmas Town November to Early January	England Carolers	Banbury Cross and Globe Theatre, England	2009	
Christmas Town November to Early January	Santa's Fireside Feast	Castle O'Sullivan, Ireland	2009	
Christmas Town November to Early January	Polar Pathway: Spectacle of Lights	Escape from Pompeii exterior	2011	
Christmas Town November to Early January	Gloria!	Abbey Stone Theatre, Ireland	2011	Rejoice
Christmas Town November to Early January	Gloria!	Abbey Stone Theatre, Ireland	2023	Celtic Fyre: A Christmas Celebration
Christmas Town November to Early January	Scrooge No More!	Globe Theatre, England	2014	A Sesame Street Christmas
Christmas Town November to Early January	'Twas That Night	Royal Palace Theatre, France	2015	
Christmas Town November to Early January	Elmo's Christmas Wish	Sesame Street Forest of Fun	2021	
Christmas Town November to Early January	Merry Misfits	Aquitaine, France	2023	
Christmas Town November to Early January	Christmas Town Live! A Holiday Special	Das Festhaus, Oktoberfest	2025	Up on the Haustop
Christmas Town November to Early January	Queens of Christmas	Il Teatro Di San Marco, Italy	2026	Wisemen

== Defunct rides and attractions ==
=== Rides ===
Name	Manufacturer	Type	Opened	Closed	Replaced by
Gladiator's Gauntlet	Vekoma	Canyon Trip	1988	1993	
Questor		Simulator ride	1990	1996	King Arthur's Challenge
Sea Dragon	Mack Rides	Sea Storm	1987	1998	Apollo's Chariot
Eagle One Monorail	Westinghouse Electric Corporation	Monorail	May 1975	1998	
Drachen Fire	Arrow Dynamics	Custom Looper	1992	1998	Festhaus Park
King Arthur's Challenge		Simulator ride	1996	2001	Corkscrew Hill
Wild Maus (formerly Wild Izzy)	Mack Rides	Wild Mouse roller coaster	1996	2003	Curse of DarKastle; relocated to Busch Gardens Tampa as "Cheetah Chase"
Le Mans Raceway	Arrow Dynamics	Antique car ride	1975	2006	Griffon
Big Bad Wolf	Arrow Dynamics	Suspended Roller Coaster	1984	2009	Verbolten
Riffle Rapids		Children's water ride	c. 1994	c. 2009	relocated and rethemed as Bert and Ernie's Loch Adventure
Corkscrew Hill		Simulator ride	2001	2010	Europe in the Air
Europe in the Air	Reflectone	Simulator ride	2010	2016	Battle for Eire
Curse of DarKastle	Oceaneering	Tracked Dark Ride	2005	2018	DarKoaster: Escape the Storm
Eggery Deggery	Zamperla	Mini Ferris Wheel	1994	2018	
Die Wirbelwindchen	Hampton	Mini Swing Ride	1975	2019	
Battle for Eire		Simulator ride	2018	2020	Return to Corkscrew Hill (upcoming)
Da Vinci's Cradle	Zierer	Magic Carpet	1983	2022	
Mäch Tower	Moser's Rides	Drop Tower	2011	2023	
The Flying Machine	Tivoli	orbiter	1980	2024	

=== Entertainment (incomplete) ===
Name	Season	Performance Space	Opened	Closed	Replaced by
Follies		Magic Lantern Theatre, Hastings	1975	1976	Camelot Revue
Camelot Revue		Magic Lantern Theatre, Hastings	1976	1977	Once Upon a Dragon
Once Upon a Dragon		Magic Lantern Theatre, Hastings	1977	1978	Kaleidoscope
Kaleidoscope		Magic Lantern Theatre, Hastings	1979	1982	Hats Off to Hollywood
Hats Off to Hollywood		Magic Lantern Theatre, Hastings	1983	1985	Journey Into Music
Journey Into Music		Magic Lantern Theatre, Hastings	c. 1986	1988	Stage Struck
Stage Struck		Magic Lantern Theatre, Hastings	1989	1992	Totally Television
Totally Television		Magic Lantern Theatre, Hastings	1993	1996	Rockin' the Boat
Haunts of the Olde Country (4D film)		Globe Theatre, Banbury Cross	1993	1998	R.L Stine's Haunted Lighthouse
The Enchanted Laboratory of Nostramos the Magnificent		The Enchanted Laboratory, Hastings	1986	2000	Secrets of Castle O'Sullivan
Rockin' the Boat		Magic Lantern Theatre, Hastings	1997	2000	Irish Thunder
Scare Search	Howl-O-Scream	Canadian Palladium, New France	2000	2001	Monster Stomp
Irish Thunder		Abbey Stone Theatre, Ireland	2001	2005	Emerald Beat
Nightscares: Awakened by Magic	Howl-O-Scream	Royal Palace Theatre, France	2005	2005	Rockin' Eve's Countdown to Midnight
R.L Stine's Haunted Lighthouse (4D film)		Globe Theatre, England	2003	2006	Pirates 4D
Fiends in the Festhaus	Howl-O-Scream	Das Festhaus, Oktoberfest	1999	2006	Festhaus Fright Night; revived as Fiends (Festhaus)
Holiday in Roma		Il Teatro Di San Marco, Italy	2000	2006	Viva Italia
Monster Stomp	Howl-O-Scream	Canadian Palladium, New France	2002	2007	none; relocated to Ireland as Monster Stomp: Revamped
American Jukebox		Canadian Palladium, New France	1998	2008	Drumberjacks and the New France Folk Trio; revived as American Jukebox: Summer Remix
Starlight Orchestra		Il Teatro Di San Marco, Italy	c. 1999	c. 2008	Festivale Italiano
Emerald Beat		Abbey Stone Theatre, Ireland	2006	2008	Celtic Fyre
Viva Italia		Il Teatro Di San Marco, Italy	2007	2008	Festivale Italiano
Secrets of Castle O'Sullivan		Castle O'Sullivan, Ireland	2001	2008	Paid dining events
Kinetix		Royal Palace Theatre, France	2006	2008	revived as Kinetix: A New Generation
Rockin' Eve's Countdown to Midnight (Rockin' Eve's Wrath: Countdown to Midnight)	Howl-O-Scream	Royal Palace Theatre, France	2006	2008	
Festhaus Fright Night	Howl-O-Scream	Das Festhaus, Oktoberfest	2007	2008	FrankenRock
Sesame Street Presents Lights, Camera, Imagination! (4D film)		Globe Theatre, England	2009	2010	Pirates 4-D (revival)
Festivale Italiano: Art Attack (Festivale Italiano); Musica di Roma; San Marco Dancers; San Marco Singers; Village Musicians		Il Teatro Di San Marco, Italy	2009	2010	Mix It Up!
FrankenRock	Howl-O-Scream	Das Festhaus, Oktoberfest	2009	2010	Fiends
Movies of the Macabre (public domain horror film showcase)	Howl-O-Scream	Il Teatro Di San Marco, Italy	2009	2010	Dig It Up!
Rejoice	Christmas Town	Abbey Stone Theatre, Ireland	2009	2010	Gloria!
Drumberjacks		Canadian Palladium, New France	2010	2010	Canadian Palladium demolished for "Le Catapult" scrambler ride
New France Folk Trio		Canadian Palladium, New France	2010	2010	Canadian Palladium demolished for "Le Catapult" scrambler ride
Monster Stomp: Revamped	Howl-O-Scream	Abbey Stone Theatre, Ireland	2008	2011	Fiends (Abbey Stone); revived as Monster Stomp on Ripper Row
A Sesame Street Christmas	Christmas Town	Globe Theatre, England	2009	2012	Scrooge No More!
Pirates 4-D (4D film)		Globe Theatre, England	2006	2009	Sesame Street Presents Lights, Camera, Imagination!
Pirates 4-D (4D film)		Globe Theatre, England	2011	2013	London Rocks and Monster Stomp on Ripper Row
This is Oktoberfest		Das Festhaus, Oktoberfest	1976	2011	
This is Oktoberfest		Das Festhaus, Oktoberfest	2013	2014	OktoberZest; revived as We Are Oktoberfest
Entwined		Das Festhaus, Oktoberfest	2012	2014	Roll Out the Barrel
Miracles	Christmas Town	Il Teatro Di San Marco, Italy	2010	2016	Gift of Harmony
Glory at the Gardens (Christian summer music festival)		Royal Palace Theatre, France	2011	2016	
London Rocks		Globe Theatre, England	2014	2016	Britmania
Roll Out the Barrel		Das Festhaus, Oktoberfest	2015	2016	OktoberZest
Starfright Orchestra	Howl-O-Scream	Il Teatro Di San Marco, Italy	2000	2008	Movies of the Macabre
Starfright Orchestra	Howl-O-Scream	Il Teatro Di San Marco, Italy	2016	2017	Skeletones
Elmo Rocks!		Il Teatro Di San Marco, Italy	2014	2015	
Elmo Rocks!		Globe Theatre, England	2016	2017	Sesame Street: Let's Play Together!
Mix It Up!		Il Teatro Di San Marco, Italy	2011	2018	Bel Concertino
Fiends	Howl-O-Scream	Das Festhaus, Oktoberfest	2011	2011	Night Beats
Fiends	Howl-O-Scream	Abbey Stone Theatre, Ireland	2012	2018	Jack is Back (2019); revived as Fiends: The FREAKquel
Britmania		Globe Theatre, England	2017	2018	American Jukebox: Summer Remix
Gift of Harmony	Christmas Town	Il Teatro di San Marco, Italy	2017	2018	Believe
Night Beats (Night Beats: Revamped)	Howl-O-Scream	Das Festhaus, Oktoberfest	2012	2019	Phantoms of the Festhaus
Believe	Christmas Town	Il Teatro di San Marco, Italy	2019	2019	Unto Us
Deck the Halls	Christmas Town	Das Festhaus, Oktoberfest	2009	2020	Up on the Haustop
Festhaus Varieté: Comedic Jugglers	Mardi Gras	Das Festhaus, Oktoberfest	2021	2021	New Orleans Brass Jazz Band
Bel Concertino		Il Teatro di San Marco, Italy	2019	2022	Sounds of San Marco
Celtic Fyre: A Christmas Celebration	Christmas Town	Abbey Stone Theatre, Ireland	2021	2022	Gloria! (2023)
Unto Us	Christmas Town	Il Teatro di San Marco, Italy	2021	2022	Wisemen
ZomBeats	Howl-O-Scream	Aquitaine, France	2021	2022	
Jack is Back	Howl-O-Scream	Killarney Village, Ireland	2003	2011	Fiends (Abbey Stone)
Jack is Back	Howl-O-Scream	Killarney Village, Ireland	2019	2023	Fiends: The FREAKquel
Mardi Party DJ	Mardi Gras	Oktoberfest	2021	2023	
The Killarney Village Band (Mardi Gras)	Mardi Gras	Abbey Stone Theatre, Ireland	2022	2023	
OktoberZest		Das Festhaus, Oktoberfest	2017	2024	We Are Oktoberfest
Sesame Street: Let's Play Together!		Globe Theatre, England	2018	2024	When the Pages Turn
Emerald Ensemble	St. Patrick's Day	Das Festhaus, Oktoberfest	2021	2024	
Phantoms of the Festhaus	Howl-O-Scream	Das Festhaus, Oktoberfest	2021	2024	Skeletones in Your Closet
Samba Jamboree (Samba Carnival)	Mardi Gras	Killarney Village, Ireland	2021	2024	Mardi Street Party (Ireland); relocated to France as The Craw Daddies
Skeletones	Howl-O-Scream	Il Teatro Di San Marco, Italy	2021	2024	Spirit Spellebration; relocated to Oktoberfest as Skeletones in Your Closet
Up on the Haustop	Christmas Town	Das Festhaus, Oktoberfest	2021	2024	Christmas Town Live! A Holiday Special
Celtic Christmas Trio	Christmas Town	Killarney Village, Ireland	2023	2024	
Rockin' Celts	St. Patrick's Day	Aquitaine, France	2023	2024	
Abbey Taverns		Ireland	2024	2024	relocated to France as Broken Turnstiles
Abbey Taverns		Das Festhaus, Oktoberfest	2024	2024	relocated to France as Broken Turnstiles
Irish Ivories	St. Patrick's Day	Il Teatro di San Marco, Italy	2024	2024	
Dublin Over		Killarney Village, Ireland	2021	2025	Broken Turnstiles (extension)
Bürgermeister's Hideaway (paid dining experience)	Year-Round	Germany	2022	2025	opened to the public
Mardi Street Party	Mardi Gras	Aquitaine, France	2023	2024	The Craw Daddies
Mardi Street Party	Mardi Gras	Killarney Village, Ireland	2025	2025	The Big Easy Bash
American Jukebox: Summer Remix		Globe Theatre, England	2023	2025	Across the Pond: Legends of the UK
Wisemen	Christmas Town	Il Teatro Di San Marco, Italy	2023	2025	Queens of Christmas
Trio di Roma		Il Teatro Di San Marco, Italy	2024	2025	Sounds of San Marco (extension)
Bürgermeister's Storytime	Food & Wine Festival	Prost! Patio, Oktoberfest	2025	2025	
Bourbon Street Brigade	Mardi Gras	Il Teatro Di San Marco, Italy	2024	2025	revamped as Encore on Bourbon Street
Bürgermeister's Storytime	Food & Wine Festival	Prost! Patio, Oktoberfest	2025	2025	
The Craw Daddies	Mardi Gras	Aquitaine, France	2025	2025	elements folded into The Big Easy Bash
Spirit Spellabration	Howl-O-Scream	Il Teatro Di San Marco, Italy	2025	2025	Undead Diva

== Animal attractions ==
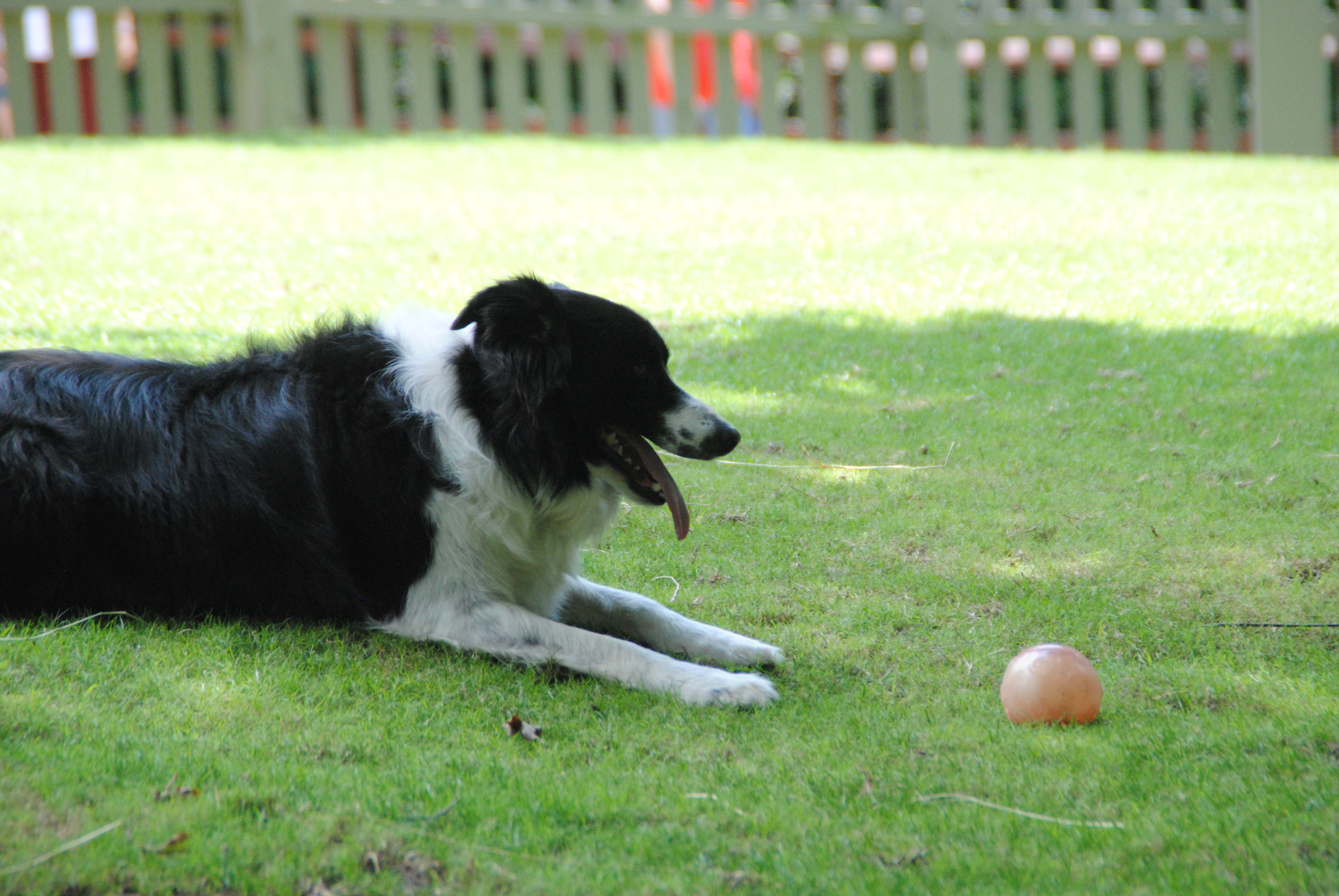
Border Collie playing in back fields of Highland Stables

=== Jack Hanna's Wild Reserve ===
Jack Hanna's Wild Reserve includes bald eagles and wolves. Eagle Ridge is a 3,000+ foot area set aside for housing and rehabilitating bald eagles and providing education to visitors. Wolf Haven is a viewing area where guests may observe one of Busch Garden's pairs of wolves. One pair is on exhibition at a time. Busch Gardens also provides Wolf Valley for those wolves not on display. Over 8,000 feet (2,400 m) of natural habitat is intended to ensure the animals' health and well-being. It also contains an aviary named Lorikeet Glen, which displays Rainbow lorikeets, and other birds. The wild reserve is located in the Ireland section of the park. In recent years, animal attractions at the park have been extensively removed, though the staple attractions remain.

=== Highland Stables ===
Busch Gardens' Highland Stables features Scottish Blackface sheep, Border Collies, black Clydesdales and Highland cattle. Guests can interact with the animals during daily demonstrations. It is located between the England and Scotland sections.

== Parking and transportation ==
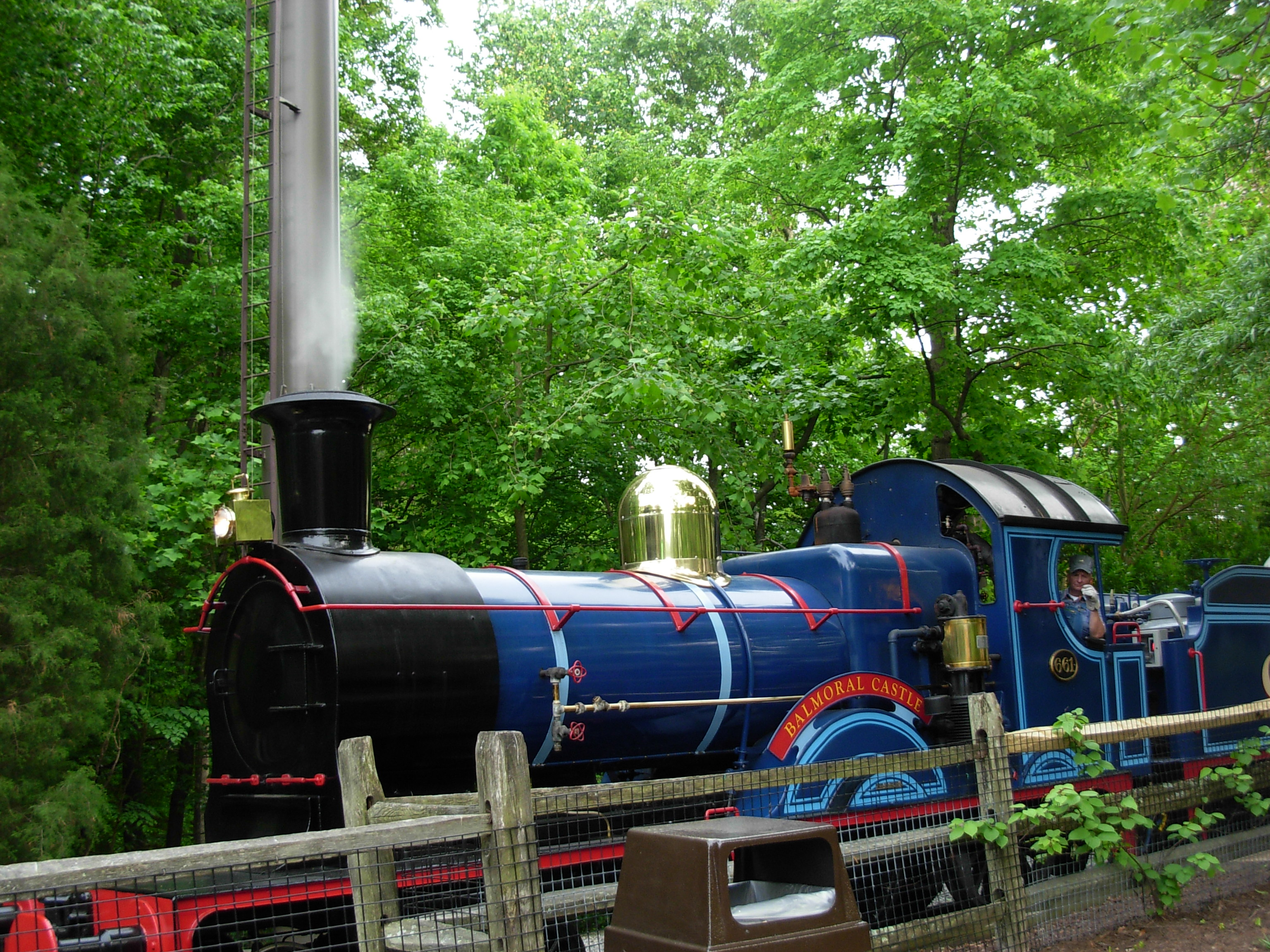
A Caledonian Railway locomotive built by Crown Metal Products for the Busch Gardens Railway.

At the park, special parking areas are provided for persons with disabilities, recreational vehicles and groups arriving by buses and motorcoaches. Trams provide shuttle service to and from entrance gates from outlying parking areas.

Within the park itself, three steam locomotive powered trains operate on the 3 ft (914 mm) narrow gauge Busch Gardens Railway, a 1.5-mile (2.4 km) loop of track, providing transportation between the Heatherdowns, Festa Italia and New France themed areas. Additionally, a skyride provides transportation between the Banbury Cross, Aquitaine and Rhinefeld themed areas.

== Awards and recognition ==
In 2021, the park was also nominated by USA Today to be the fourth best amusement park in the country.

Golden Ticket Awards: Best Landscaping – Amusement Park
Year	1998	1999	2000	2001	2002	2003	2004	2005	2006	2007	2008	2009	2010	2011	2012	2013	2014	2015	2016	2017	2018
Ranking	1	1	1	1	1	1	1	1	1	1	1	1	1	1	1	1	1	1	1	1	1

NAPHA Survey: Most Beautiful Park
Year	1990	1991	1992	1993	1994	1995	1996	1997	1998	1999	2000	2001	2002	2003	2004	2005	2006	2007	2008	2009	2010	2011	2012	2013	2014	2015	2016	2017	2018	2019	2020	2021	2022
Ranking	1	1	1	1	1	1	1	1	1	1	1	1	1	1	1	1	1	1	1	1	1	1	1	1	1	1	1	1	1	1	1	1	1

NAPHA Survey: Favorite Theme Park
Year	2005	2006	2007	2008	2009	2021
Ranking	1	1	-	1	1	1

== Attendance (rounded) ==
2008	2009	2010	2011	2012	2013	2014	2015	2022
3,094,000	2,900,000	2,800,000	2,744,000	2,856,000	2,726,000	2,699,000	2,780,000	

== Gallery ==
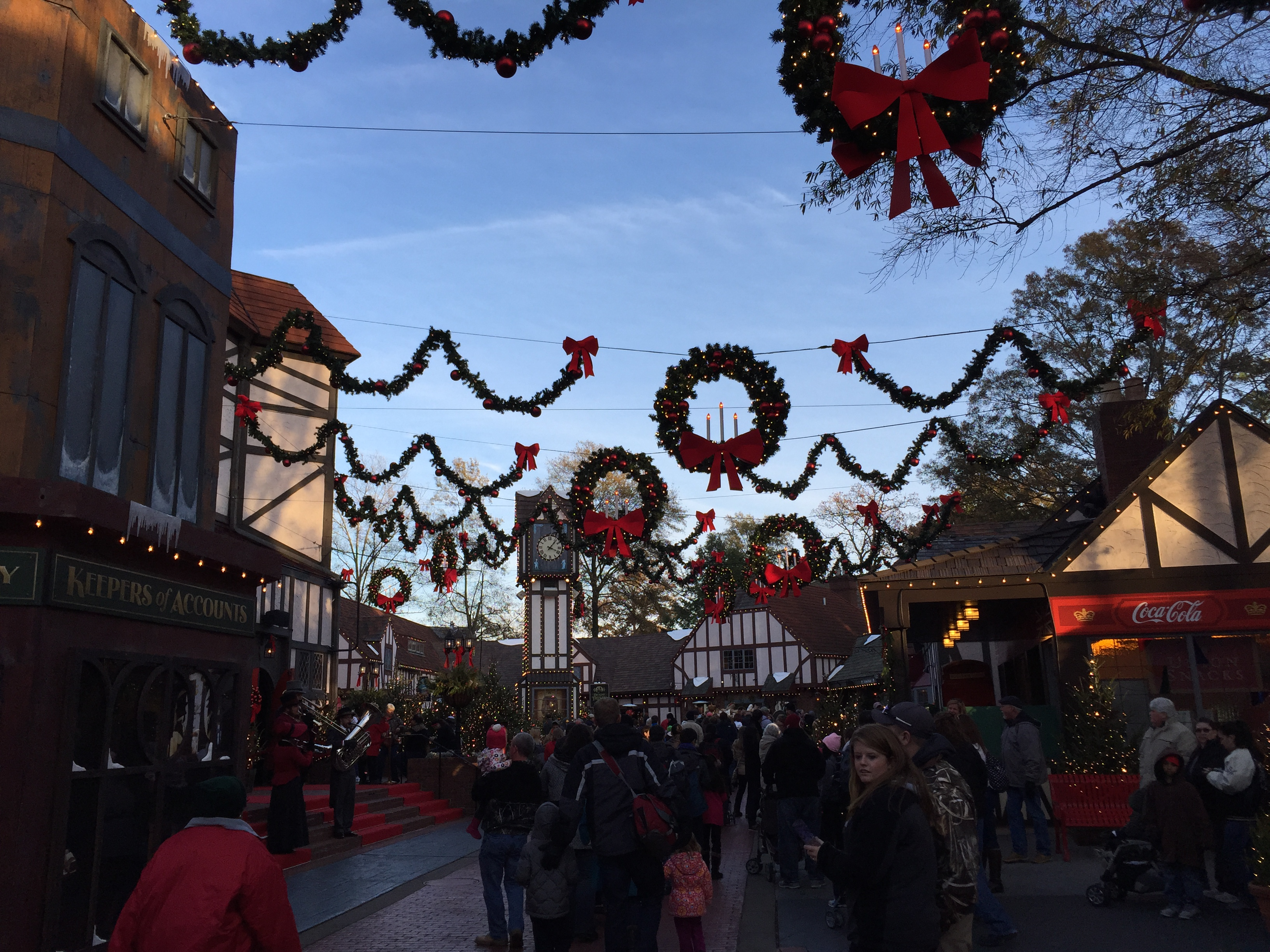
Daytime Street View of Banbury Cross, England with Christmas Decoration Visible

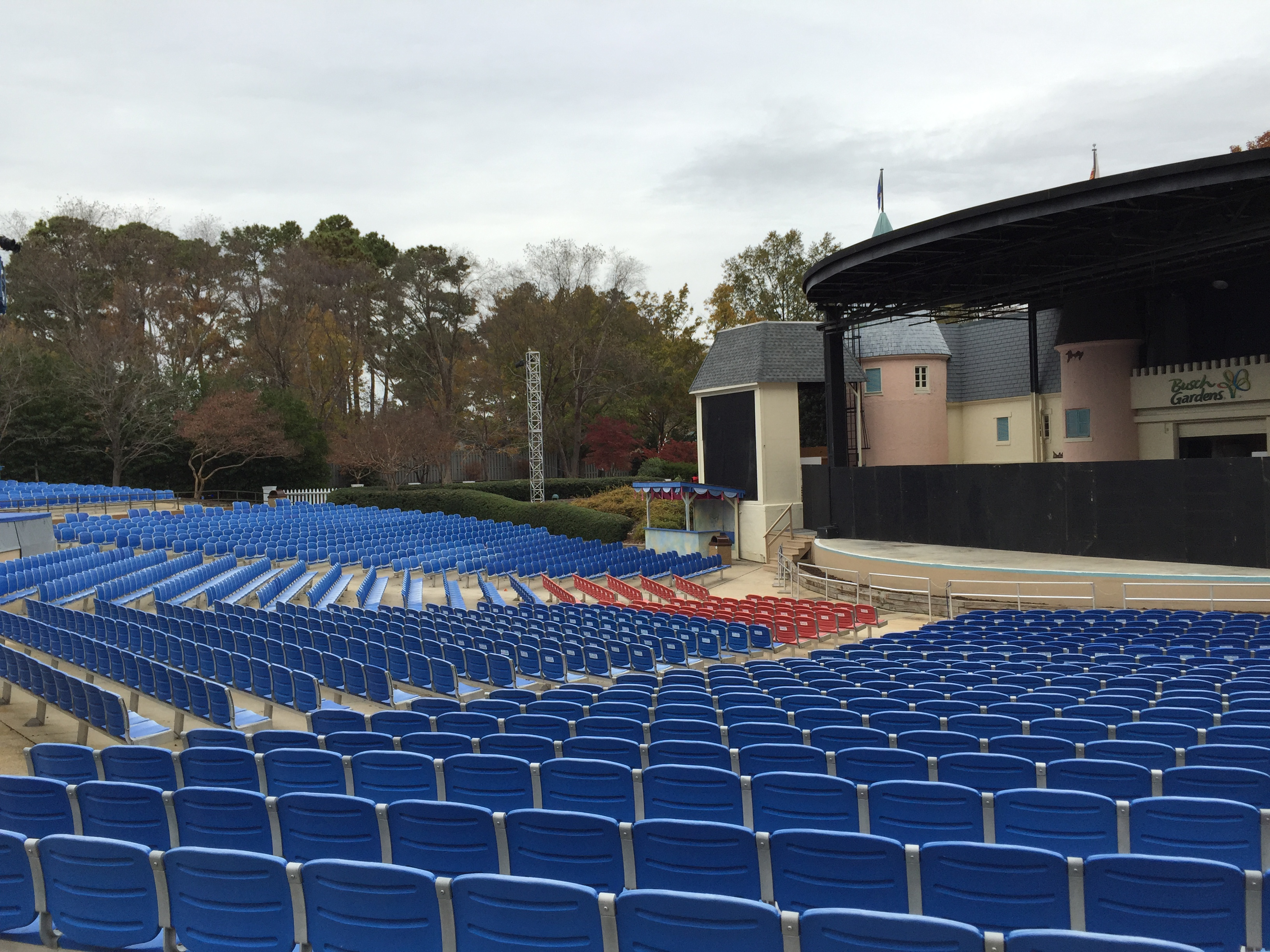
Seating in the Royal Palace Theatre

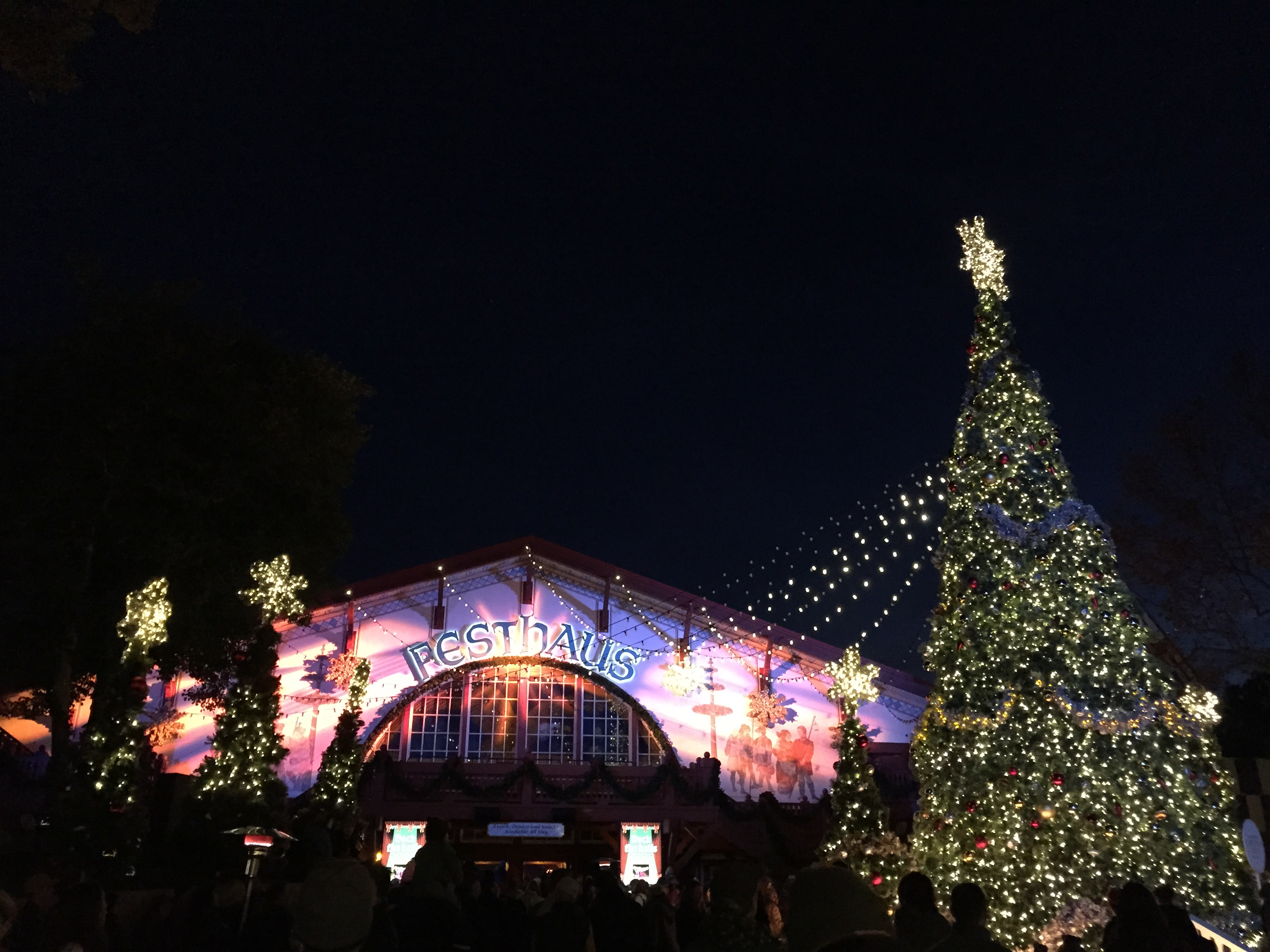
Front View of Das Festhaus at Christmas Town

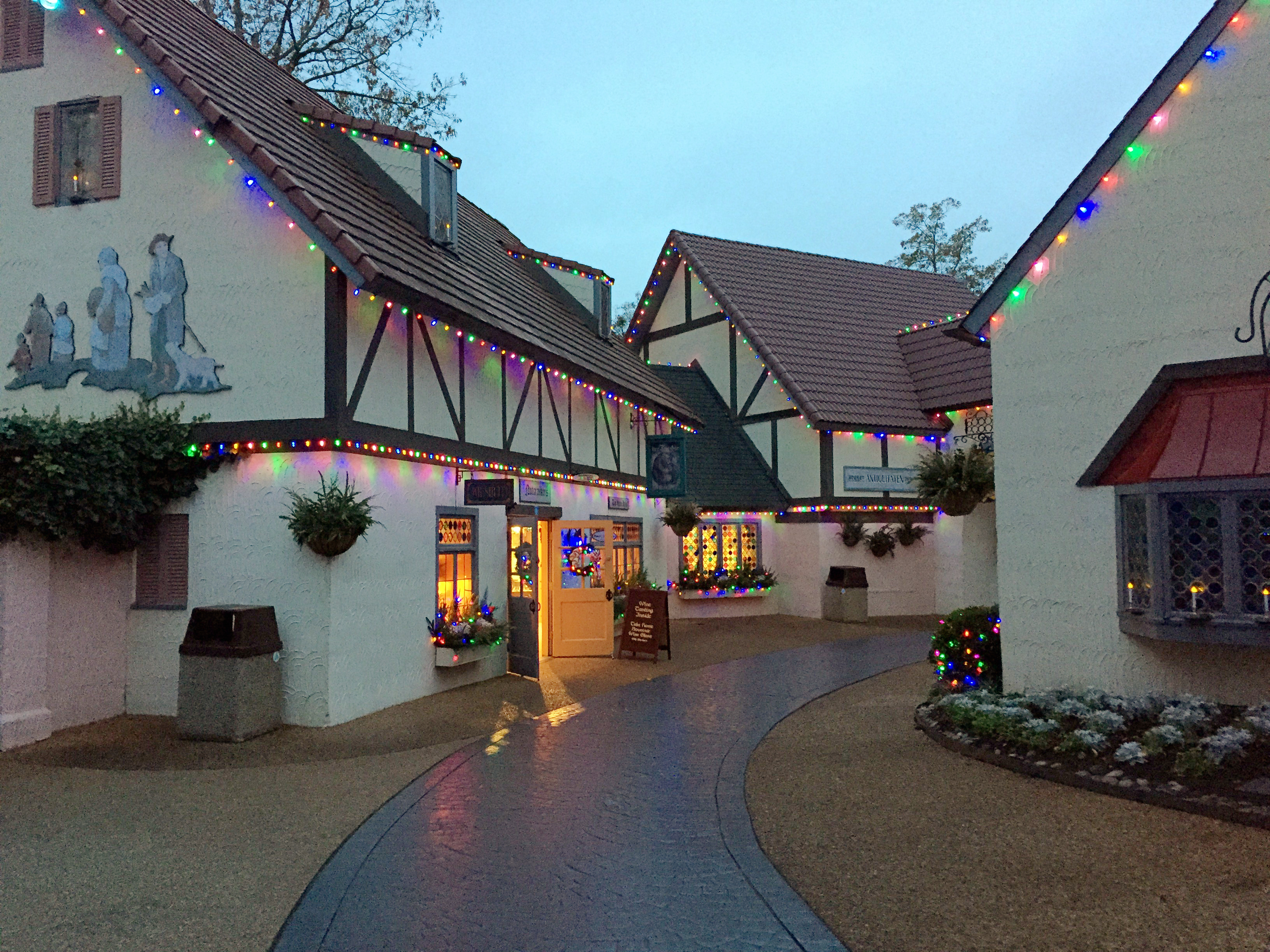
Another View of the North Pole (Rhinefeld)

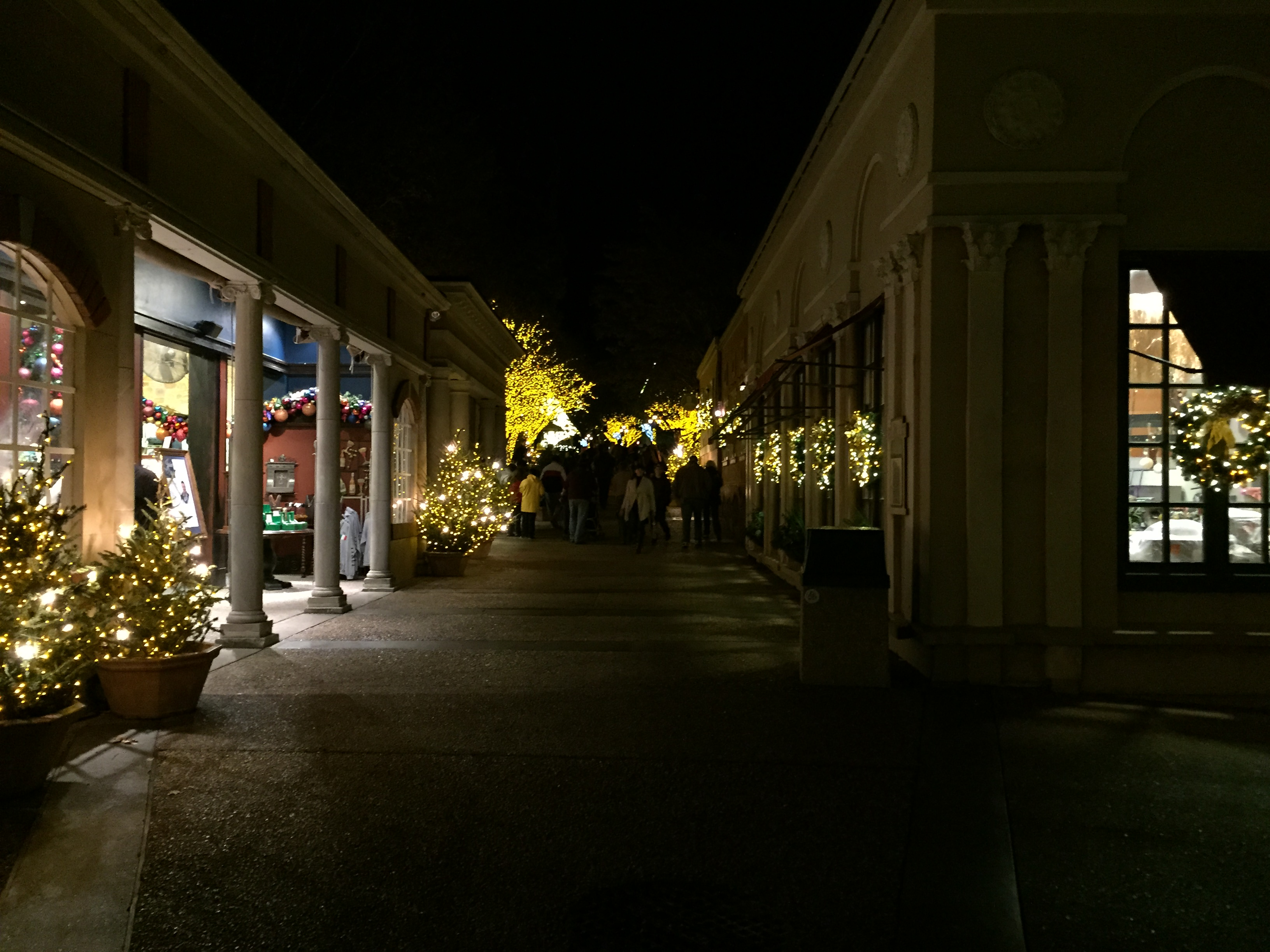
Night View of San Marco, Italy

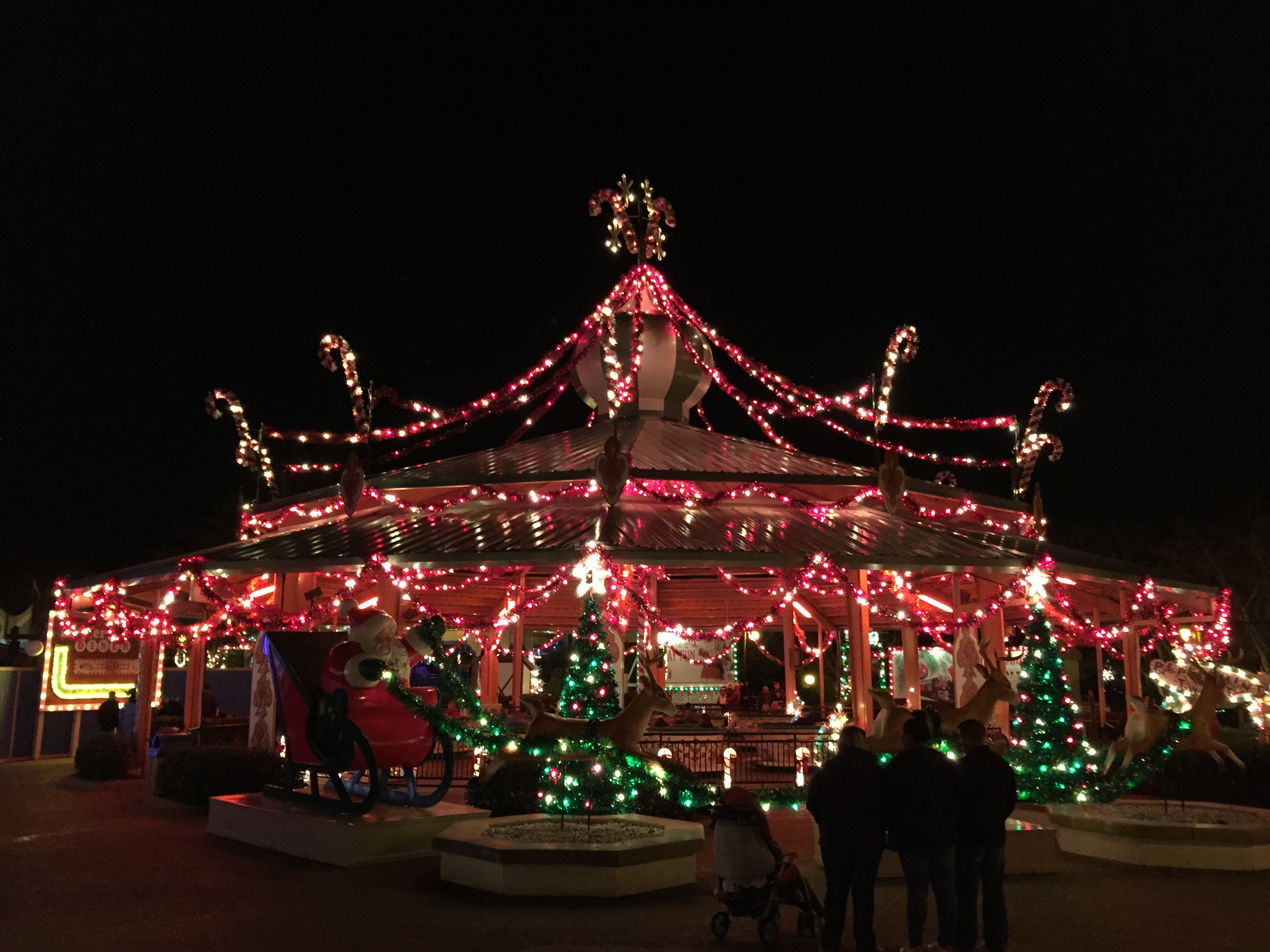
The "Peppermint Twist" in Christmas Livery

== Sources ==
- Busch Gardens Williamsburg expansion announcement page
- Busch Gardens Williamsburg official website
- Busch Gardens Williamsburg Howl-o-Scream official website
- Busch Gardens Williamsburg Christmas Town official website
- Busch Gardens Williamsburg at the Roller Coaster DataBase
