= Big Bad Wolf: The Wolf's Revenge =

Inverted Steel family roller coaster in Williamsburg, Virginia

The Big Bad Wolf: The Wolf's Revenge
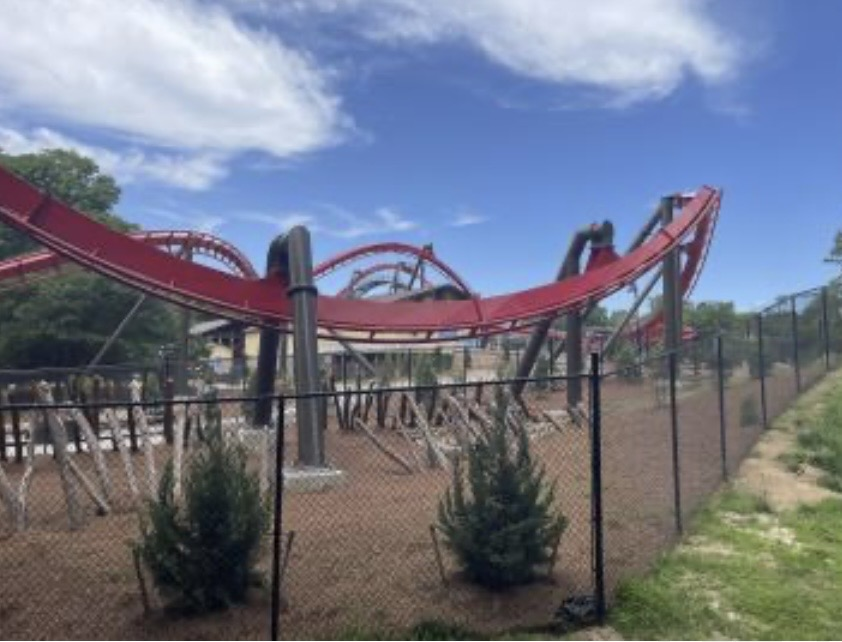

Busch Gardens Williamsburg
- Location: Busch Gardens Williamsburg
- Park section: Oktoberfest
- Coordinates: 37.2304°N 76.6449°W
- Status: Operating
- Opening date: May 23, 2025
- Replaced: Drachen Fire

General statistics
- Type: Steel – Lift hill
- Manufacturer: Bolliger & Mabillard
- Model: Family Inverted Coaster
- Lift/launch system: Chain lift
- Height: 67 ft (20 m)
- Length: 2,583 ft (787 m)
- Speed: 40 mph (64 km/h)
- Inversions: 0
- Restraint style: Lap bar
- Height restriction: 42–76 in (107–193 cm)
- Trains: 2 trains with 10 cars; riders arranged 2 across in a single row for a total of 20 riders per train
- The Big Bad Wolf: The Wolf's Revenge at RCDB

The Big Bad Wolf: The Wolf's Revenge is a family inverted roller coaster at Busch Gardens Williamsburg in Williamsburg, Virginia. The coaster, which opened on May 23, 2025, is the spiritual successor to the original Big Bad Wolf roller coaster. Designed by Swiss firm Bolliger & Mabillard, it is the second model of its kind in the United States after Phoenix Rising at Busch Gardens Tampa. The coaster is 2,583 feet (787 m) long and features two chain lift hills. The ride reaches a maximum height of 67 feet (20 m) and a maximum speed of 40 miles per hour (64 km/h). It was built on the site of Drachen Fire, an Arrow Dynamics Custom Looping Coaster that closed in 1998.

== Ride experience ==
When leaving the station, the train makes a 180 degree right turn before reaching the chain lift hill. After reaching the top, the train dives down towards the right-hand side. The train dashes horizontally before traversing through town buildings inside a German village. Once past the village, the train arrives at the second lift hill. After descending again and narrowly avoiding a wolf trap, the train turns around near an Oktoberfest celebration plaza featuring with tables and beer mugs. The ride concludes with a turn to the right, leading to the brakes adjacent to the station.

== See also ==
- Big Bad Wolf, The former roller coaster where Verbolten is currently.
