= Vikings' River Splash =

River raft ride at Legoland parks

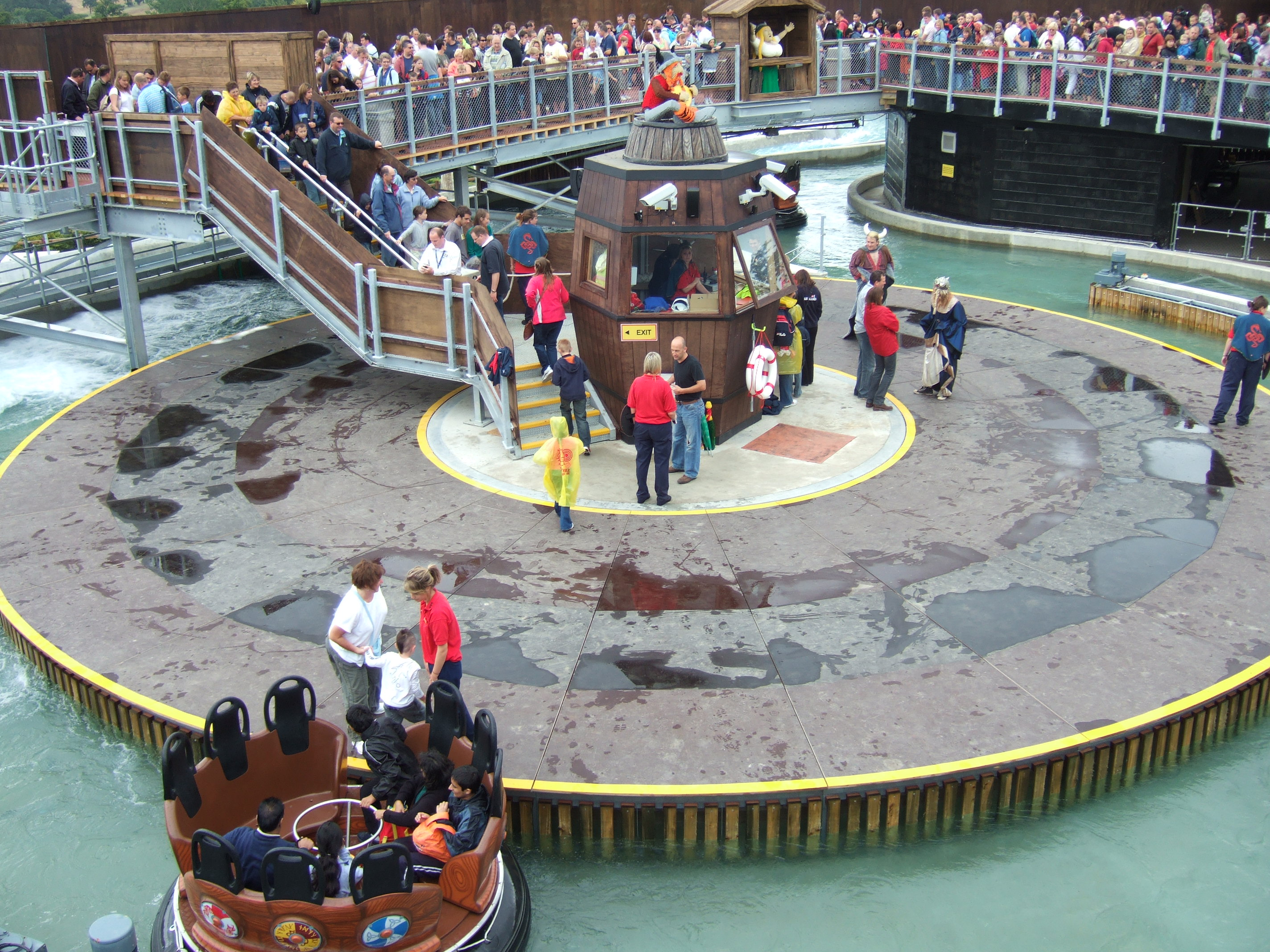
- Vikings' River Splash station in Windsor

Legoland Windsor
- Area: Land of the Vikings
- Status: Removed
- Opening date: August 18, 2007
- Closing date: September 25, 2023

Legoland Billund
- Area: Knight's Kingdom
- Status: Removed
- Opening date: May 6, 2006
- Closing date: October 2024
- Replaced by: Minifigure Speedway

General statistics
- Type: River rafting ride
- Model: Rapids Ride
- Height restriction: 110 cm (3 ft 7 in)
- Virtual queue: Reserve & Ride Available

Vikings' River Splash was a pair of river rapids rides formerly located at Legoland Windsor Resort in Berkshire, England and Legoland Billund Resort in Denmark. Both rides both featured Lego models, water sprays, and cannons along their courses.

== Locations ==
=== Legoland Windsor ===
The British version of the ride opened in 2007, albeit later than expected due to construction delays. It was manufactured by ABC Rides and had a ride duration of around three minutes. The attraction was briefly shut down for inspection in May 2017 after a fatality on a similar rapids ride at Drayton Manor Resort.

On 29 August 2023, Legoland Windsor announced that Vikings River Splash would close permanently on Monday 25 September 2023. Demolition proposals were finally submitted in February 2026, with plans expected to be lodged for a replacement roller coaster at a later date.

=== Legoland Billund ===
Opening a year earlier than its British counterpart, the Billund version was manufactured by Intamin and featured an elevator lift leading to an 8-metre (26 ft) drop. The length was around 438 metres (1,437 ft) and water flowed at a rate of up to 3 metres per second (6.71 mph).

The attraction was demolished in the winter and spring of 2025 to accommodate Minigure Speedway, which was officially announced on 1 July 2025.

== See also ==
- Pirate Falls Treasure Quest
