= Mäch Tower =

Amusement ride at Busch Gardens

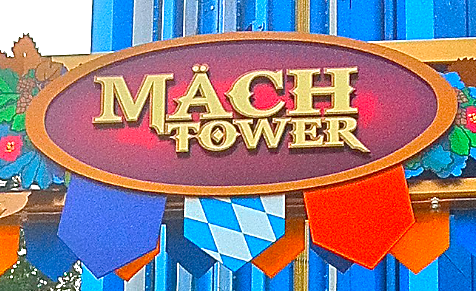

Busch Gardens Williamsburg
- Area: Oktoberfest
- Status: Removed
- Opening date: August 18, 2011
- Closing date: January 8, 2023
- Replaced: Der Catapult (moved to New France)

Ride statistics
- Attraction type: Drop tower
- Manufacturer: Moser's Rides
- Model: Roto-Drop
- Height: 238 ft (73 m)
- Speed: 50 mph (80 km/h)
- Capacity: 510 riders per hour
- Riders per vehicle: 30
- Duration: 90 seconds from start to drop
- Height restriction: 48 in (122 cm)
- Quick Queue was available
- Wheelchair accessible
- Must transfer from wheelchair

Mäch Tower was a drop tower, located at Busch Gardens Williamsburg, in James City County, Virginia.

== Description ==
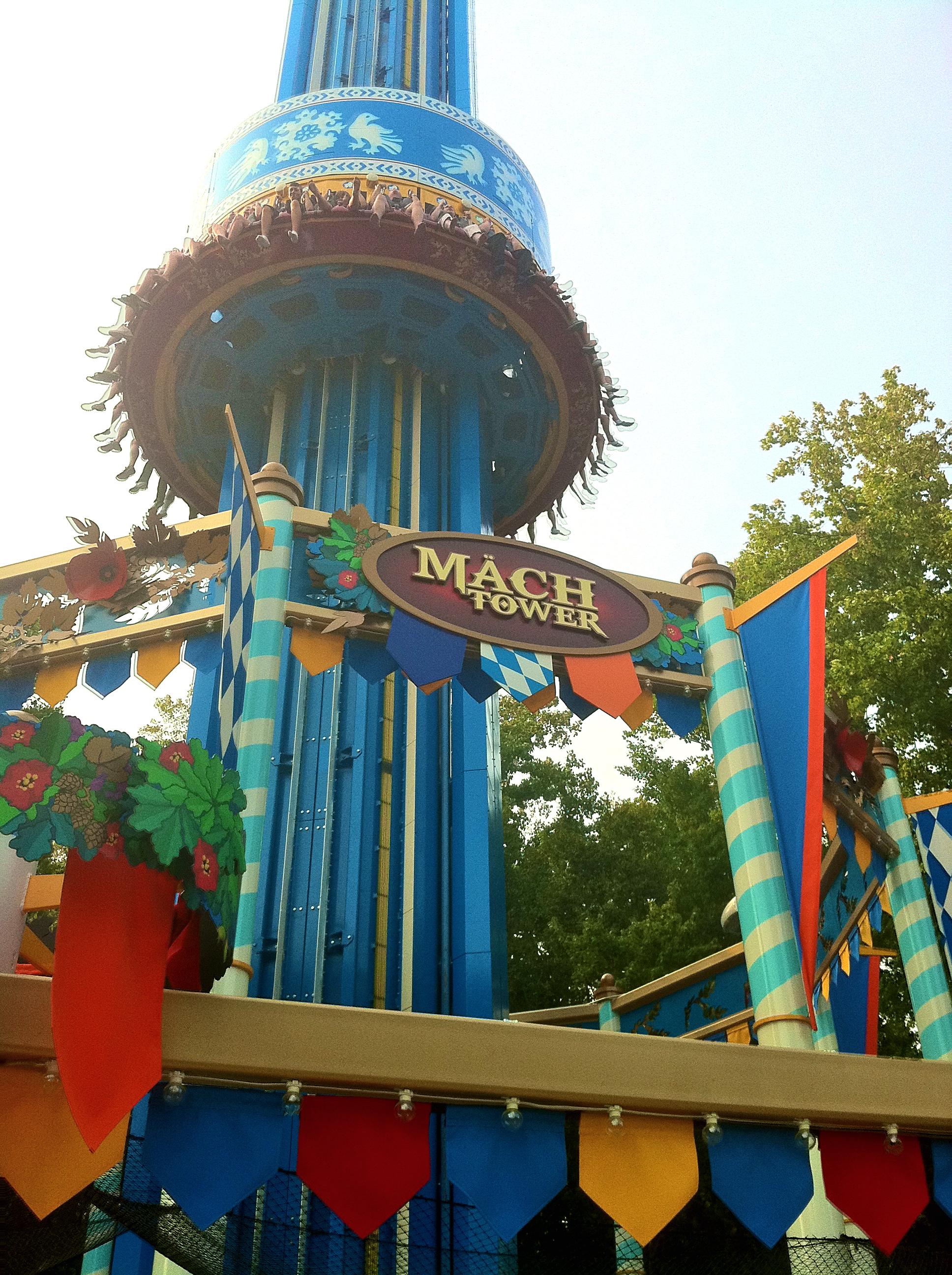
Mäch Tower as it begins its ascent.

Located in the park's Oktoberfest section, Mäch Tower's base was encircled by two concentric rings of pillars from which festive blue, orange and red banners hung. The tower's bright color palette and signature flags were also mirrored on nearby restaurants, shops, and booths. The ride carriage itself featured a large, blue casing that was adorned with depictions of doves, crests, and festive designs that further exemplified the German theme. The queue line was located in a Bavarian-lodge style wooden covering that wrapped around the tower's base.

Mäch Tower was one of two drop towers in SeaWorld Parks & Entertainment with the other drop ride being Falcons Fury at Busch Gardens Tampa. Announced in September 2010, Mäch Tower soft-opened on August 18, 2011 (initially having been targeted for a "late spring 2011" opening.) The gondola held thirty riders divided into four colored zones (red, green, blue, and yellow). It ascended at a rate of 6 feet per second to the top, completing three revolutions along the way to give all riders a panoramic view of the park and the nearby James River.

The ride was also unique in that it had on-ride audio, with speakers attached to the ride carriage that played classical, European-themed music during the ride's ascension. Once the gondola had reached the top of the tower, the classical music ended in three dramatic notes which trailed off in an echo. After a short pause, the carriage dropped at 50 miles per hour.

Mäch Tower used a magnetic braking system to slow the carriage quickly and smoothly once it reaches the bottom of the tower. This system – typical for many drop tower rides – is fail-safe, because magnets do not need to be powered by electricity or other sources; they work intrinsically by the laws of magnetism.

Taller riders with long torsos, or more stout riders, may have found that they didn’t fit in the seats. The problem was that while the shoulder harness locked the seat sensors would not register the harness as secured. This would prevent the ride from launching. Such passengers would have to leave the ride. As of August 26, 2011, operators were giving passengers thus removed from the ride a pass that permitted a single re-ride on another attraction in compensation.

During the park's holiday event, Christmas Town, the tower operated as "Nacht Tower" and the freefall element was disabled. The tower operated instead as a rotating scenic tower, offering views of the park's festive light displays. This did not return in 2022.

It was announced in late 2022 that the tower was to give its final rides on January 8, 2023. The ride closed permanently on that same day.

== Construction ==
According to reports, 760 cubic yards of concrete were needed to create the tower's foundation. The foundation required 85 concrete delivery trucks, and took 10 hours of consistent pouring to lay the entire base.

== Reception ==
According to reports, some coaster enthusiasts were disappointed with the decision to construct Mäch Tower, as it was viewed as a generic, off-the-shelf ride that lacked the theming and storytelling of Busch Gardens' other rides (the same accusations had recently incited the closure of Disney California Adventure Park's Maliboomer drop tower). Larry Giles, vice president of Busch Gardens engineering and maintenance, stated during an interview “We did not need to go for six hundred feet” and “I guarantee you anyone who rides the tower will be screaming on the way down”. Referring to Mach Tower’s height of 246 feet, the tower falls short of other rides of its kind, most notably compared to nearby Kings Dominion's 305 foot-tall Drop Tower, opened in 2003. Attraction reviewer Brian Krosnick noted in his review of the ride that Mäch Tower does put a unique spin on the drop tower, noting that Busch adds a festive design, a prime location, and surprises [in the music and vibration], resulting in a "grand, detail-oriented experience that puts you in your place and demands respect." He also encouraged skeptics to remember that Mäch Tower is only the first stage in a multi-year expansion for the Oktoberfest section, culminating in spring of 2012 with the opening of a new, multi-launch roller coaster, specifically mentioning that "next year when half of the [Oktoberfest] area goes “dark and sinister” with the Gardens’ hinted-at, multi-launch, world’s-first coaster, you better believe people will be flocking towards the bright blue beacon that guides the way." In July 2012 the Mach tower closed for a short period of time. The park said it was not for safety reasons but to make manufacturers recommended changes. Mach Tower reopened the day after the announcement of it being closed indefinitely.

== See also ==
- 2011 in amusement parks
- Falcon's Fury, a drop tower ride operating at Busch Gardens Tampa Bay
