= Polar X-plorer =

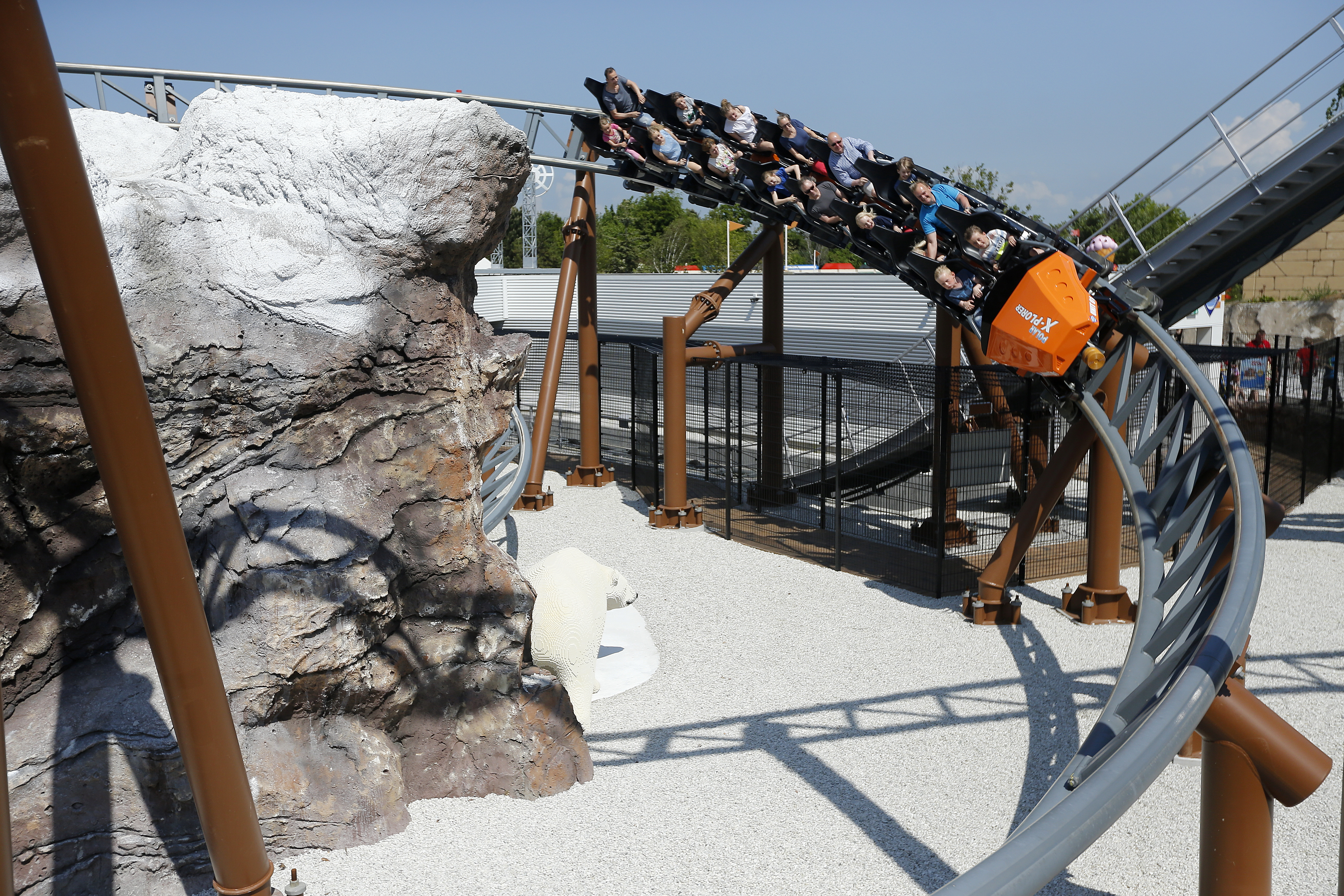
- Polar X-plorer

Legoland Billund
- Location: Legoland Billund
- Coordinates: 55.736965°N 9.121814°E
- Status: Operating
- Opening date: 29 April 2012

General statistics
- Type: Steel
- Manufacturer: Zierer
- Model: Elevated Seating Coaster
- Lift/launch system: Chain lift hill
- Height: 20 m (66 ft)
- Speed: 65 km/h (40 mph)
- Inversions: 0
- Trains: 2 trains with 8 cars; riders arranged 2 across in a single row for a total of 16 riders per train
- Reserve 'N' Ride available
- Polar X-plorer at RCDB

Polar X-plorer is a steel roller coaster at Legoland Billund in Billund, Denmark. It opened on 29 April 2012 as Zierer's first coaster with a freefall drop track section.

== History ==
On 11 October 2011, Legoland Billund announced that the park would open "Polar Land", a new area for the park. It features live penguins and a new restaurant.

== Ride experience ==
After cresting the chain lift hill, riders go through a few twists and turns before entering an indoor section, where a scene of Lego minifigures chipping away at an ice wall with picks can be seen. Suddenly, the floor beneath the minifigures gives way and the train vertically free-falls 5 metres (16 ft) before exiting the indoor portion and going through more twists and turns before going back to the station. The trains are themed as snowmobiles.

== See also ==
- 2012 in amusement parks
- Verbolten
- Th13teen
