= Moser's Rides =

Italian amusement ride manufacturer

- Formerly: Soriani and Moser (1969–1986)
- Industry: Manufacturing
- Predecessor: Soriani and Moser
- Founded: 1969
- Headquarters: Ostiglia, Italy
- Area served: Worldwide
- Products: Amusement rides

Moser's Rides (formerly Soriani and Moser) is an Italian amusement ride manufacturer based in Ostiglia. Their most notable ride is the defunct Mäch Tower in Busch Gardens Williamsburg in James City County, Virginia.

== History ==
Moser's Rides was founded in 1997 in Melara (in the Rovigo Province/Veneto Region) by Alfeo Moser and his 3 sons Stefano Moser, Mattia Moser, Sebastiano Moser from former Soriani & Moser. Then moved to Ostiglia (in Mantova Province/Lombardy Region) in 1998. As of July 2018, the company production list includes 20 thrill rides and 17 fun rides.
