= Drachen Fire =

Defunct roller coaster at Busch Gardens Williamsburg

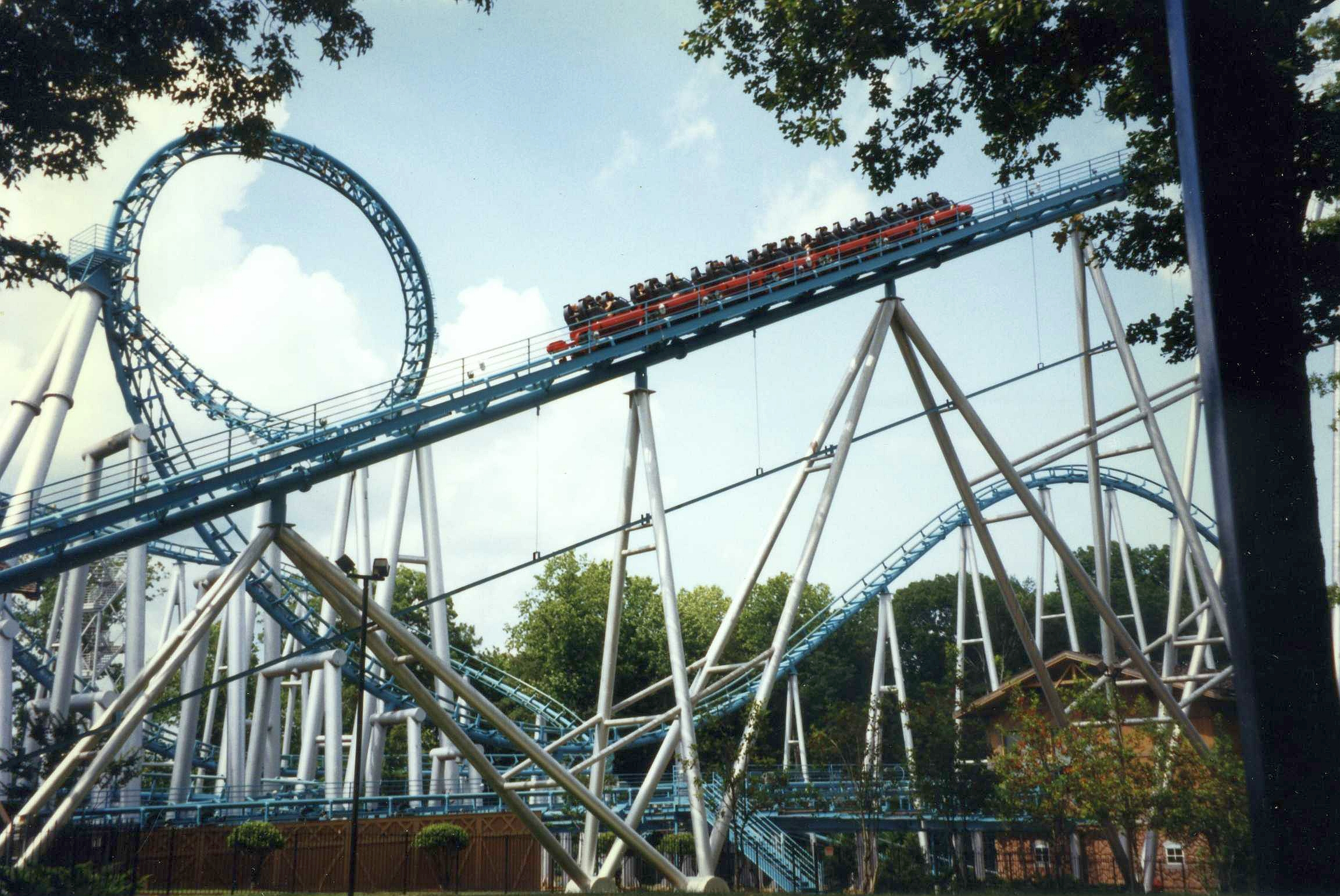
- Drachen Fire in 1996

Busch Gardens Williamsburg
- Location: Busch Gardens Williamsburg
- Park section: Festhaus Park
- Coordinates: 37.230636°N 76.644435°W
- Status: Removed
- Soft opening date: April 3, 1992
- Opening date: April 4, 1992
- Closing date: July 1998
- Cost: $4,000,000
- Replaced by: Big Bad Wolf: The Wolf's Revenge

General statistics
- Type: Steel
- Manufacturer: Arrow Dynamics
- Designer: Ron Toomer
- Model: Custom Looping Coaster
- Lift/launch system: Chain lift hill
- Height: 150 ft (46 m)
- Drop: 145 ft (44 m)
- Length: 3,550 ft (1,080 m)
- Speed: 60 mph (97 km/h)
- Inversions: 5
- Trains: 3 trains with 7 cars; riders arranged 2 across in 2 rows for a total of 28 riders per train
- Drachen Fire at RCDB

Drachen Fire was a steel roller coaster located at Busch Gardens Williamsburg in Williamsburg, Virginia. Manufactured by Arrow Dynamics, the ride opened to the public in 1992. Drachen Fire featured a 150-foot-tall (46 m) lift hill, six inversions, and a zero-gravity camelback element. One of the inversions was removed after the 1994 season to improve ride comfort. The track was light blue with silver supports, and it was located in the Oktoberfest portion of the park behind Big Bad Wolf and Das Festhaus. It was originally configured with three trains, each consisting of red cars with grey seats, and featured red trim lights that illuminated the trains at night. Drachen Fire was closed in the middle of the 1998 season following a history of low ridership and complaints of roughness. It remained standing until its demolition in 2002.

== History ==
=== Construction and opening ===
On July 5, 1991, Busch Gardens Williamsburg announced that a new steel roller coaster would be added to the park in 1992. Built by Arrow Dynamics, the ride would be located towards the back of the park next to Big Bad Wolf. The ride would be named Drachen Fire, after the word for "dragon" in German. It would become the park's third major roller coaster. The attraction would feature six inversions, as well as other elements like a camelback hump and a cutback. The ride's 60-foot (18 m) trains would feature a sleek aerodynamic style design and wraparound bucket seats. That year, the Anheuser-Busch Entertainment Corporation announced a myriad of upcoming attractions for their various amusement parks. Keith M. Kasen, then General Manager for Busch Gardens Williamsburg, commented on the addition of Drachen Fire for the 1992 season stating, "Anheuser-Busch has shown a commitment to reinvestment and making a real strong quality statement."

Construction of Drachen Fire began in the fall of 1991, which was filmed for its upcoming marketing campaign. Footage of the design, construction, and testing process of Drachen Fire was later documented in a 1993 PBS special of their NOVA program, titled "Roller Coaster". Construction of the new coaster was completed in early 1992, placing it on schedule to open the same year on April 4. Busch Gardens heavily marketed the new ride in what was identified as the park's biggest promotional campaign in over a decade dating back to Loch Ness Monster in 1978. The tagline marketed for the ride was "Feel the Heat".

The park hired comedian Dana Carvey to meet and greet visitors, as well as cut the ribbon at a special preview opening ceremony on April 3, 1992. After six or seven successful runs during the preview event, a train stalled on the lift hill forcing passengers to evacuate. During the downtime, Carvey offered an impromptu stand-up comedy routine to entertain the crowd and keep guests occupied. When the ride resumed operation, another train stalled on the lift hill again forcing the park to close the ride for the remainder of the evening. For its official opening to the public the following day, Drachen Fire remained closed all morning and eventually opened midday.

=== Operation ===
The ride drew large crowds and was initially well-received by many coaster enthusiasts. American Coaster Enthusiasts President Ray J. Ueberroth called the coaster "an outstanding ride", and the group's former president, Randy Geisler, stated, "I can just say it's spectacular." However, less than a month after opening, the coaster's popularity quickly faded when it gained a reputation for its roughness. Just over a week after the ride had opened, the Newport News Daily Press reported that three riders were taken to the hospital because they had complained of neck pain. A spokesman for Busch Gardens Williamsburg said there was no problem with the coaster itself. In 1995, another guest sued Busch Gardens, Arrow Dynamics, and technical consultant William N. Carlson, alleging that he had received "severe permanent injuries" two years earlier because of the ride's restraint system. However, more than a year later, a Busch Gardens official said that the guest had never formally served the park with a lawsuit.

Riders were routinely advised by announcers to remove any clip-on earrings before riding and keep their heads pressed against headrests during the ride. This resulted in ride operators in the station not only checking the train's restraints, but also checking riders' ears for earrings. The train would not dispatch unless these instructions were followed. After increasing complaints, the corkscrew directly after the block brake was replaced with a straight section for the 1995 season.

=== Closure and demolition ===
The removal of the corkscrew after the mid-course brake run failed to resolve ongoing issues with ride safety and comfort. Busch Gardens Williamsburg had also added two more roller coasters after Drachen Fire: Wild Maus in 1996 and Alpengeist in 1997. The opening of the latter coaster had made Drachen Fire obsolete, as guests preferred to ride Alpengeist. Local residents also complained that the screams of riders on Drachen Fire were disturbing them. Ultimately, the attraction was closed indefinitely in July 1998. According to a Daily Press report, Busch Gardens shut down the ride after a 43-year-old guest had suffered a brain injury that month. The following year, the park would debut another Bolliger & Mabillard roller coaster, Apollo's Chariot, while Drachen Fire sat abandoned.

The Daily Press reported in January 1999 that the park planned to further modify the coaster. However, by that August, the coaster had been listed for sale for several months. The park had several offers but failed to reach agreements with prospective buyers. It remained standing in an idle state until 2002, when the decision was made to dismantle the ride and recycle the steel. Director of public relations Cindy Sarko stated, "There had been a steady erosion of ridership ... That, combined with the high operating expenses of the ride, helped park officials make the decision to shut it down." In June 2019, local network affiliate WAVY-TV reported that a plan was approved by local officials to construct a new ride in the former Drachen Fire location that would be approximately 355 feet (108 m) in height. However, in September 2024, the park announced plans to build a Bolliger & Mabillard family inverted coaster on this plot instead. The new ride is named Big Bad Wolf: The Wolf's Revenge, in homage to the former Big Bad Wolf suspended coaster that once operated next to Drachen Fire.

== Ride experience ==
The ride had about 3,500 feet (1,100 m) of track.

After leaving the station, the ride made a small dip and turned 180 degrees to the left, where it entered the lift hill. At the top of the 150 foot lift, the ride made a shallow dive of around 50 feet, then entered a wraparound corkscrew which had an apex of 120 feet, before descending the remainder of a curving drop, ending up facing the opposite direction of the lift hill, and achieving a speed of 60 miles per hour. The ride then entered a camel back hump hill, which was designed to balance the riders between positive and negative g-forces, giving a feeling of weightlessness. The ride then entered the Batwing element (cobra roll), which featured two inversions in one element. The ride then turned up an ascending hill to the left, and engaged in a set of block brakes. Next, the ride dove down into a corkscrew, then a slight left turn over the park midway into a cutback. The ride then traversed back over the midway, under the first corkscrew and entered a second corkscrew. It then quickly entered a counter-clockwise helix. Exiting the helix, the ride made a right hand turn onto a final brake run, which would then lead straight into the ride station.
