= Pirate Falls Dynamite Drench =

Water ride at Legoland Windsor

Pirate Falls Treasure Quest
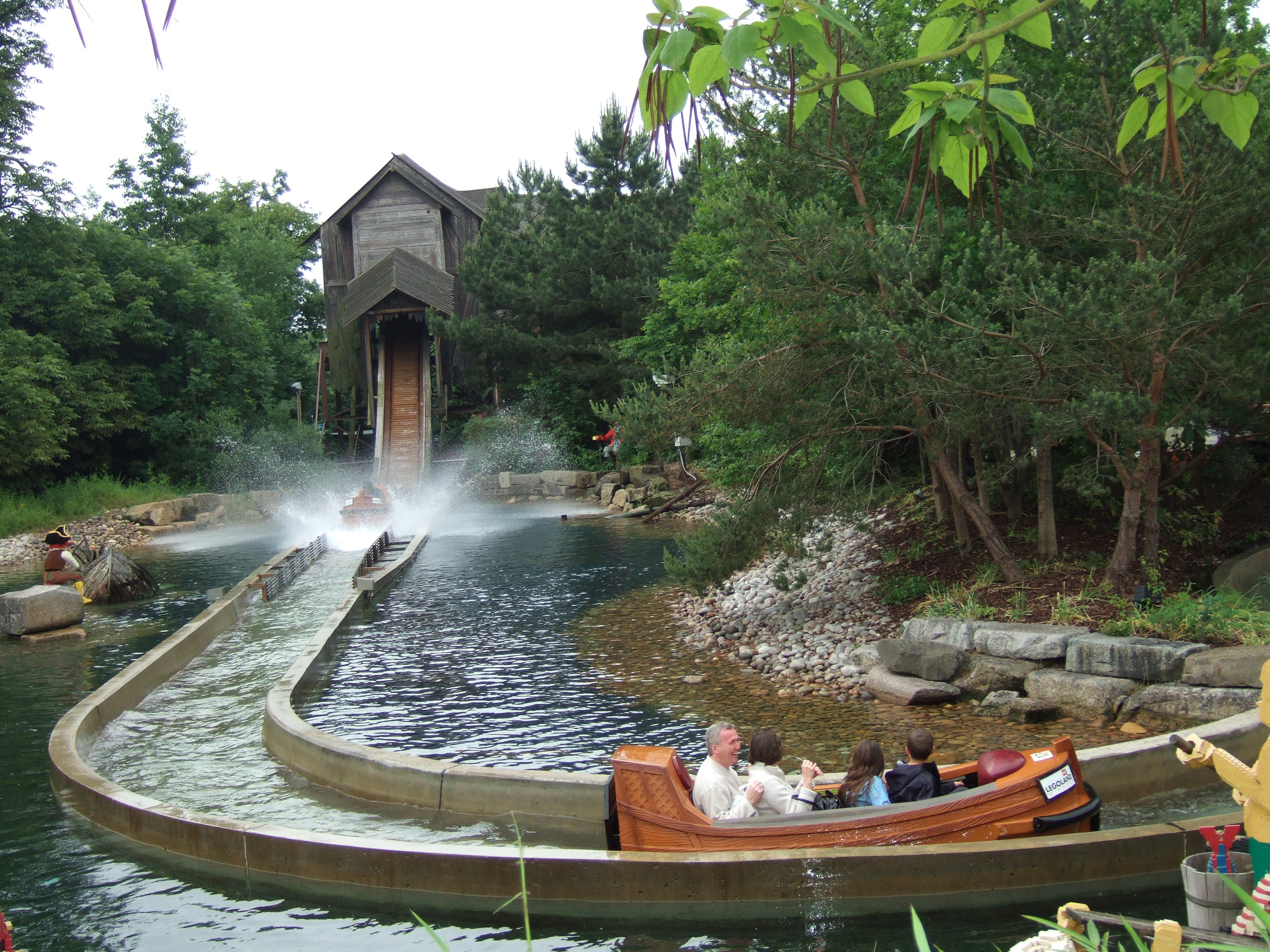
- The ride's drop at the end

Legoland Windsor
- Area: Pirate Shores
- Status: Operating
- Opening date: March 1996

General statistics
- Type: Log flume
- Manufacturer: Zamperla
- Boats: Several boats. Riders are arranged 1 across in 4 rows for a total of 4 riders per boat.
- Height restriction: 100 cm (3 ft 3 in)
- Virtual queue: Q-Bot available

Pirate Falls Treasure Quest (previously known as Pirate Falls and Pirate Falls Dynamite Drench) is a log flume at Legoland Windsor, in the Pirate Shores (Formerly Wild Woods and Pirates Landing) area. It opened with the rest of the park in March 1996.

== Description ==
After the boat leaves the station, it goes around a gentle stream. Along the stream there are Lego pirates that spray water at riders. The boat then turns into an area with a lake with water sporadically blowing up into the air. The boat then passes through the pirates' graveyard and past a robotic parrot which tells riders to turn back. The boat then goes up the lift hill into a shack where a pirate lights a fuse. After a brief encounter with a vengeful pirate, an explosion sound goes off and the boat drops into the pool.

== See also ==
- Log Flume
- Legoland Windsor
- Vikings' River Splash, another water ride at Legoland Windsor
