= Dagny Holm =

Danish LEGO model designer

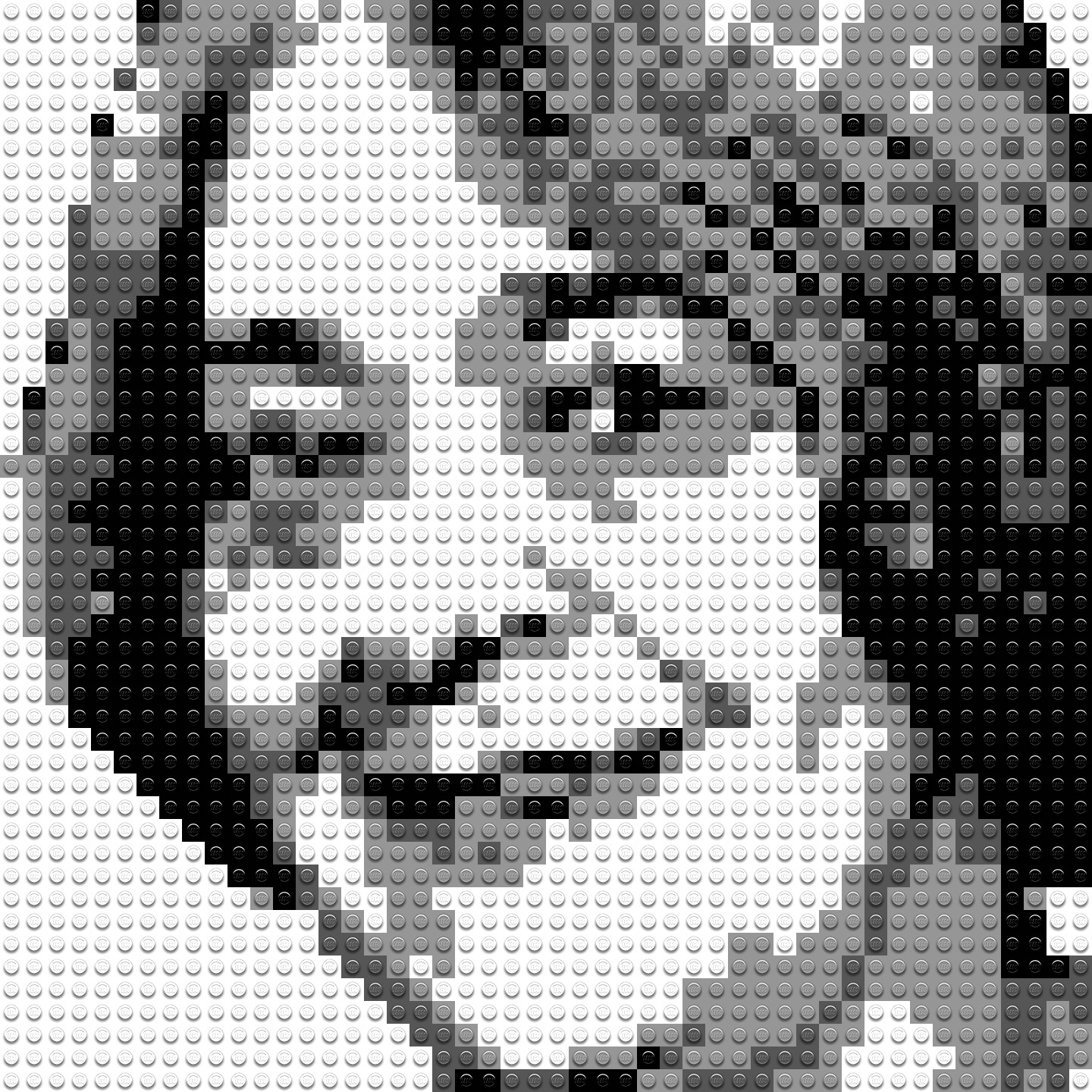
- Dagny Holm Lego portrait by Stewart Lamb Cromar
- Born: May 18, 1916
- Died: March 1, 2004 (aged 87)
- Occupation: Model designer
- Known for: The first Master Builder in the Lego Group.
- Relatives: Ole Kirk Kristiansen (uncle); Godtfred Kirk Christiansen (cousin)

Dagny Holm (18 May 1916 – 1 March 2004) was the Lego Group's chief model designer until 1986, when she retired at the age of 70.

== Early years ==
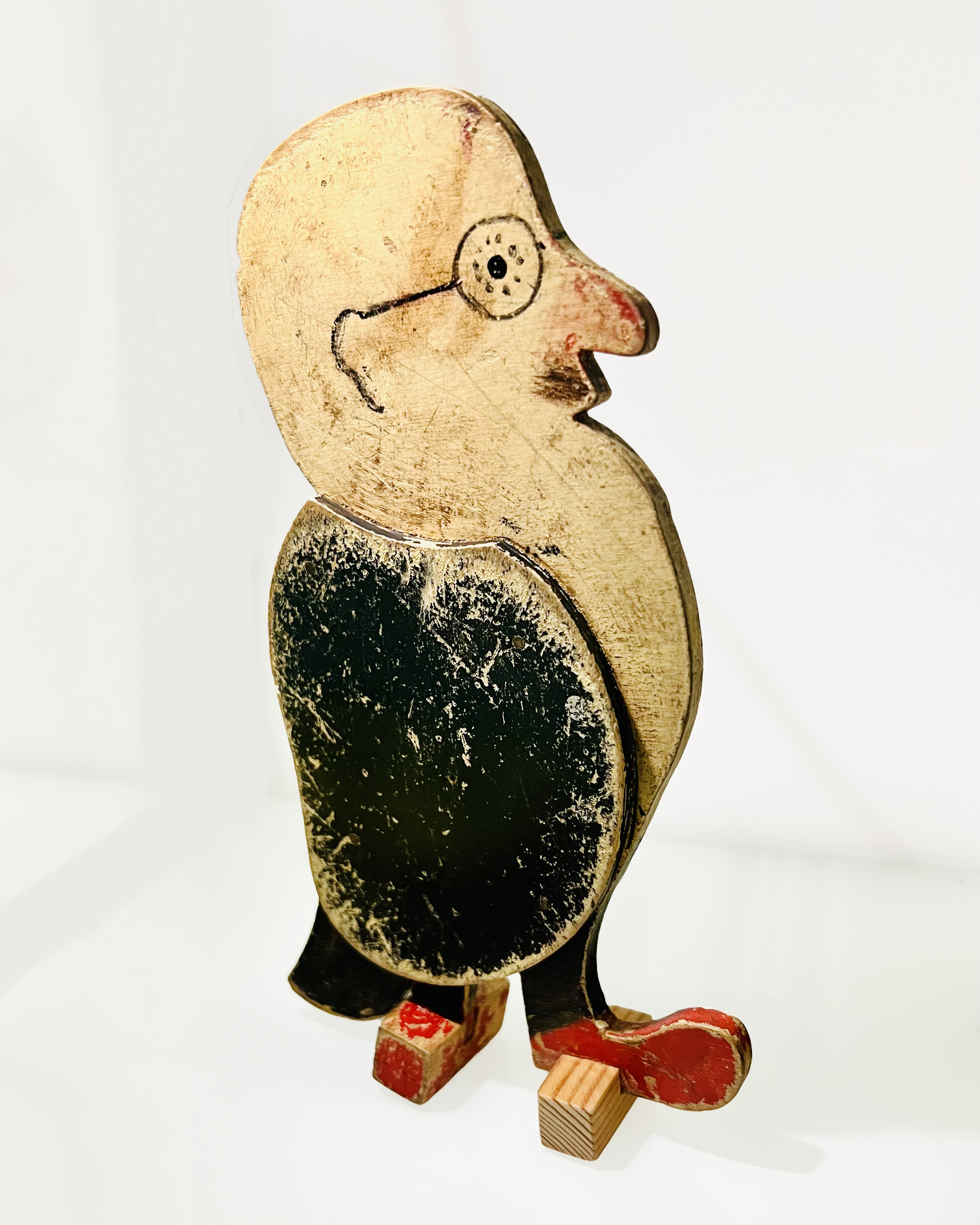
Thorvald Stauning caricature by Dagny Holm

In 1936 Holm interned for 3 months at the Lego Group where she designed wooden toys. One of her first pieces was a caricature model of the then Danish prime minister, Thorvald Stauning.

Holm previously studied classical sculpture design with training from the German sculptor Kurt Harald Isenstein.

== Legoland model designer ==
In 1961 Holm was hired as a model designer at Legoland Billund Resort and is credited with much of the original design and building of Miniland.

As chief designer in the model shop Holm was responsible for all Lego model designs of the Legoland Park in Billund when it opened in 1968.

== Legacy ==
=== Tributes ===
On 1 March 2022 the Lego Group released a commemorative set (40503) celebrating Holm, their first Master Builder.

The 1,068 piece product features Holm as a Miniland scale figure working on a large-scale model of a giraffe in a workshop filled with small-scale versions of her other models.
