= Minifigure Speedway =

Racing roller coaster at Legoland Parks

Legoland Windsor Resort
- Park section: Bricktopia
- Coordinates: 51.465524°N 0.651588°W
- Status: Operating
- Opening date: April 6, 2024; 2 years ago
- Cost: £10 million
- Replaced: Raft Racers

Legoland Billund Resort
- Coordinates: 55.736799°N 9.124850°E
- Status: Operating
- Opening date: March 28, 2026; 6 months ago
- Replaced: Vikings' River Splash
- Minifigure Speedway at Legoland Billund Resort at RCDB

General statistics
- Type: Steel – Family – Shuttle
- Manufacturer: Zierer
- Model: Dueling Reverse Coaster
- Lift/launch system: Drive tire
	Legends	All Stars
Height	45.9 ft (14.0 m)	45.9 ft (14.0 m)
Length	800.5 ft (244.0 m)	800.5 ft (244.0 m)
Speed	34.8 mph (56.0 km/h)	34.8 mph (56.0 km/h)
Duration	1:07	1:07
- Restraint Style: Lap bar
- Trains: 2 trains with 10 cars. Riders are arranged 2 across in a single row for a total of 20 riders per train.
- Minifigure Speedway at RCDB; Pictures of Minifigure Speedway at RCDB

Minifigure Speedway is a dual-tracked roller coaster located at Legoland Windsor Resort in Berkshire, England and Legoland Billund Resort in Denmark. Themed to the brand of Lego racing, the attraction allows families to race riders on opposite tracks while traveling both forwards and backwards.

== History ==
Legoland Windsor representatives first announced in January 2022 that a new "rollercoaster plan” would soon come forwards as a part of a swath of park investments. The park formally lodged a planning application with the Royal Borough of Windsor and Maidenhead Council in August 2022, revealing blueprints for the attraction.

Minifigure Speedway was formally announced on 15 November 2023 as the UK's first LEGO duelling coaster, created by Merlin Entertainments' own Magic Making team and representing a £10 million investment. Track and supports began to arrive on site shortly thereafter, with the first red track piece being installed on 6 December 2023 Legoland Windsor officially opened Minifigure Speedway on 6 April 2024.

Legoland Billund Resort first submitted plans in December 2024 to drain the water of Vikings' River Splash for a new roller coaster, with plans to open in 2026. Demolition was promptly carried out on the attraction in the winter and spring of 2025. The Danish version of Minifigure Speedway was officially announced on 1 July 2025.

== Characteristics ==
Minifigure Speedway both share the same layout and statistics, although Windsor's is built more onto the hillside while Billund's utilizes trenches and therefore has a lower elevation. Each track on each coaster is 45.9 feet (14.0 m) tall, 800.5 feet (244.0 m) long, and reaches a top speed of 34.8 mph (56.0 km/h) throughout the ride. Each track uses a ten-car train, seating two riders per single row in each for a total of 20 passengers per train and 40 passengers per cycle.

Each track – dubbed Team Legends or Team All Stars – uses two booster wheel lift hills at either end, the first of which hoists riders backwards before sending them forwards through the layout and the second vice versa. Throughout the layout the tracks route head-on towards each other as opposed to running side by side like many racing coasters. Both attractions primarily feature Roxie, a 9-metre (30 ft) tall minifigure statue billed as the world's largest, weighing over 6 tonnes and serving as the ride's host.
