= Verbolten =

Roller coaster at Busch Gardens Williamsburg

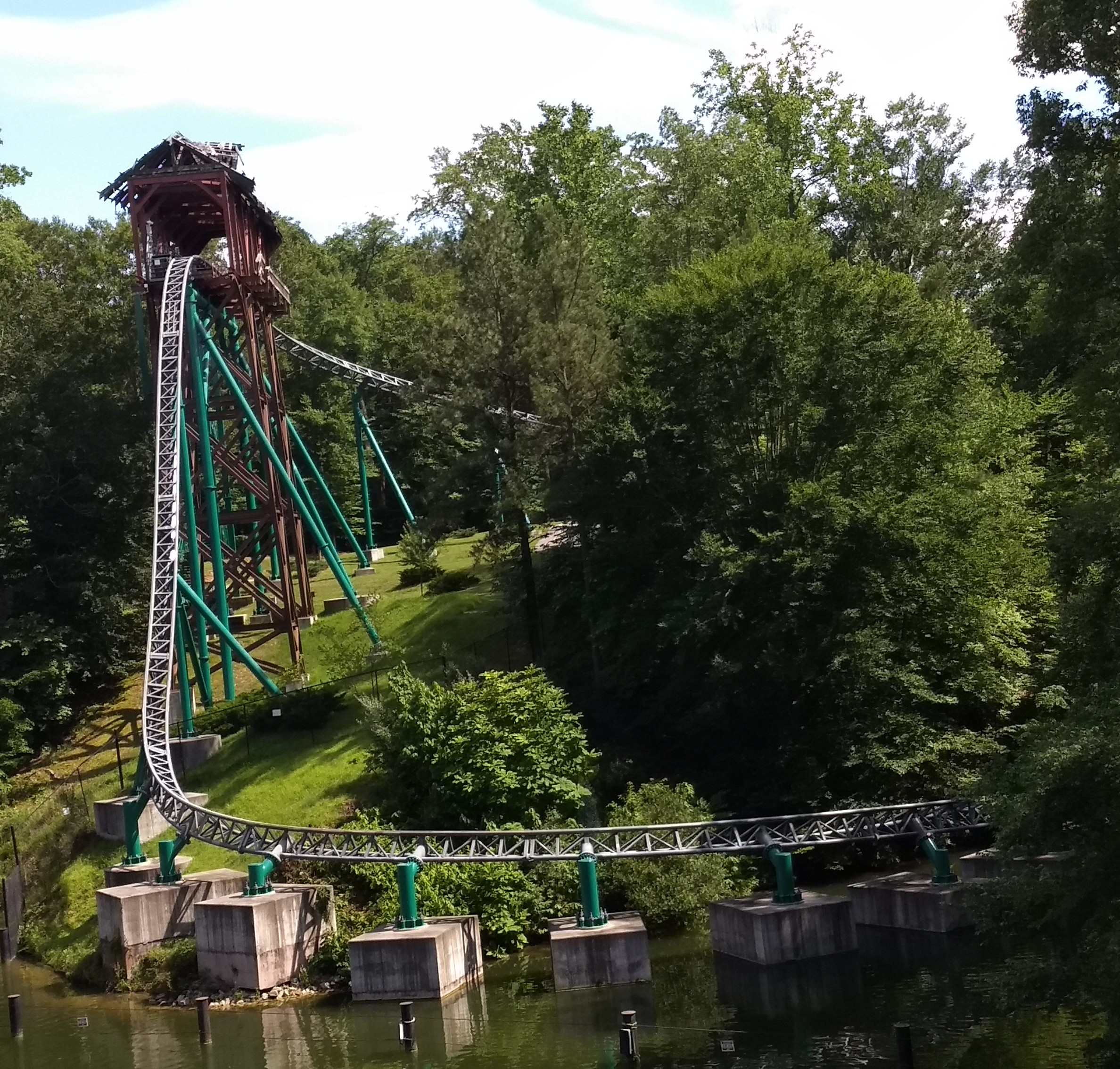

Busch Gardens Williamsburg
- Location: Busch Gardens Williamsburg
- Park section: Oktoberfest
- Coordinates: 37.231498°N 76.644919°W
- Status: Operating
- Soft opening date: May 11, 2012
- Opening date: May 18, 2012
- Replaced: Big Bad Wolf

General statistics
- Manufacturer: Zierer
- Designer: PGAV Destinations
- Model: Family Launched Coaster Elevated Seating Coaster
- Track layout: Custom terrain design
- Lift/launch system: LSM Launch
- Drop: 88 ft (27 m)
- Length: 2,835 ft (864 m)
- Speed: 53 mph (85 km/h)
- Inversions: 0
- Duration: 1:58
- Capacity: 1400 riders per hour
- G-force: 4.2
- Height restriction: 48 in (122 cm)
- Trains: 5 trains with 8 cars. Riders are arranged 2 across in a single row for a total of 16 riders per train.
- Theme: Black Forest/Autobahn
- Tagline: Brave the Black Forest
- Restraints: Lap bar
- Quick Queue available
- Verbolten at RCDB

Verbolten is a steel launched roller coaster located at Busch Gardens Williamsburg in Williamsburg, Virginia, United States. Manufactured by Zierer, the family coaster opened to the public on May 18, 2012. It features multiple launches and was built on the former site of Big Bad Wolf, a suspended roller coaster that closed in 2009. The park's creative design team assisted Zierer with the concept and design. "Verbolten" is a play on words of the German word verboten, which translates to "forbidden" in English.

== History ==
Busch Gardens Williamsburg announced a renovation to the Oktoberfest section in October 2010. This included a now defunct drop tower named Mäch Tower, which opened the year after. The remodel also included a new multi-launch coaster with first-of-its-kind elements. In May 2011, the coaster's layout was made public during a James City County, Virginia board meeting.

On September 17, 2011, Busch Gardens Williamsburg officially announced Verbolten, a family launched roller coaster with two launched sections and a building that houses special effects. The coaster was constructed on the former site of Big Bad Wolf. The track layout was completed in January 2012. Verbolten had a soft opening on May 11, 2012. A week later on May 18, the ride opened to the public.

Other coasters, such as Th13teen at Alton Towers and Hagrid's Magical Creatures Motorbike Adventure at Islands of Adventure, also feature a vertical free-fall drop.

On November 8, 2025, Busch Gardens Williamsburg announced that Verbolten would undergo a major re-imagining. The attraction closed on January 4, 2026, for refurbishment and retheming, and reopened on May 30, 2026 under the new name Verbolten: Forbidden Turn.

== Theme ==
The ride was inspired by the Autobahn, the German highway system. As shown in the teaser video, a car takes a leisurely trip down the Autobahn, but suddenly lightning strikes the car and causes it to drive into the Black Forest, a "forbidden" forest in which the ride takes place. The dark forest encounters weather changes, such as lightning, as shown in the video.

The queue and station are themed as a motor tours agency owned and operated by the brother-and-sister team of Gerta and Gunter Schwartzwald. A portion of the queue is decorated as Gunter's office, which houses such curious items as plant samples, monitors, and the luggage of the unlucky tourists who have come before. The station house is themed as a garage where riders board trains that resemble stretched roadsters in one of five colors. The theme of the ride itself is the Black Forest and various legends associated with it.

The ride features an indoor portion (referred to as the "show building"), which represents a ride through the Black Forest and features one of three alternating special effects–driven story lines. The inside of the event building is decorated with painted drops and set pieces, as well as featuring unique sound and lighting effects, such as low whistles.

Formerly, there were three randomized story lines inside the event building:

- The Spirit of the Forest: In this story, the effects feature a peaceful-sounding spirit who lures riders into the forest and then turns on them.
- Lightning Storm: In this story, the effects feature a violent storm that threatens to destroy the riders and their vehicle.
- The Big Bad Wolf: In this story, the effects feature a pair of glowing red eyes that stalk the train during its journey through the forest, a nod to the ride's predecessor.

The inclusion of multiple effects stories ensures that repeat riders will have a unique experience.

== Layout ==
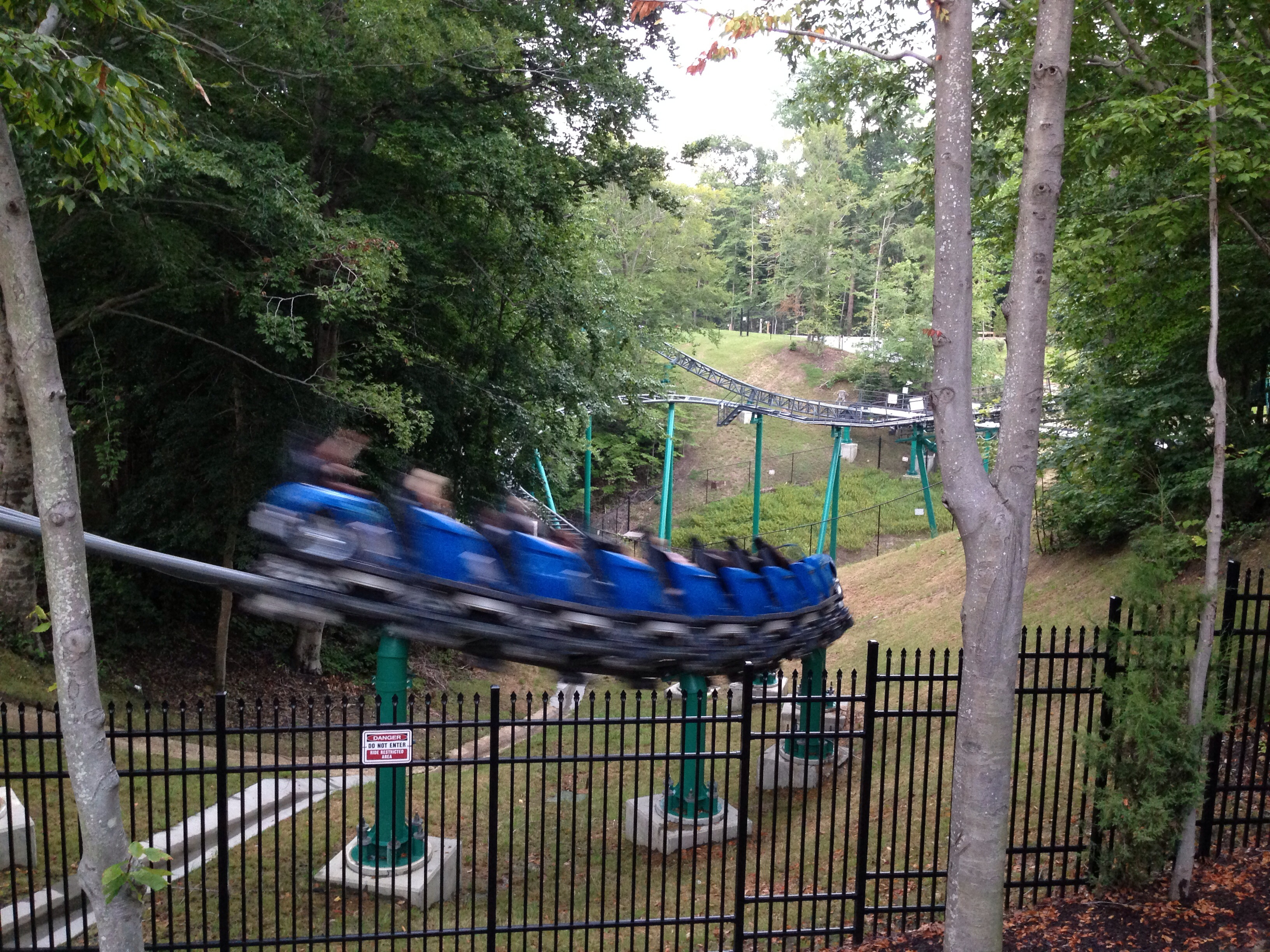
Verbolten tracks, August 2013

The train departs the station gently dipping to the left into a leisurely winding S-curve. Exiting the S-curve, the train enters the first linear synchronous motor launch, accelerating through a stone archway into the event building and cresting an airtime hill. This is followed by a dive into a series of high speed turns and a helix that guides the train onto a brake run, where a psychedelic visual of leaves with wind-blowing sounds are on display. The train then dives into a curve and up a medium-sized hill onto a second brake run, as it slowly comes to a stop. During this time, more psychedelic special effects are displayed, which vary depending on the theme's rotation that switches from ride to ride. After the train stops for a few moments on a pitch black section of track, magnets suspending the train release, quickly dropping riders 18 feet (5.5 m) vertically while they remain facing horizontally.

The train rests for a moment before descending a short dip into the second LSM launch, accelerating the train to its top speed of 53 mph (85km/h) out of the event building and through an ascending reverse S-turn. This leads to another brake run on a decaying covered bridge accompanied by sound effects of the bridge creaking in the wind. As a recreation of the Big Bad Wolf's finale, the train drops 88 feet (27 m) off the bridge into a hard left-hand turn along the river bank. A high speed S-curve follows, as the train traverses a bunny hop and a turnaround into the final brake run.

== Tributes to Big Bad Wolf ==
Multiple nods to Verbolten's predecessor, the Big Bad Wolf, can be found throughout the ride and queue:

- One of the five trains, the orange train, reads "WOLF X ING" on its license plate.
- One of the three stories played within the event building features glowing red wolf eyes that chase riders through the forest.
- The final drop down to the riverbank as well as the turns that follow it copy the original coaster's drop towards the river and reuse the concrete footers.
- In the revamped Verbolten: Forbidden Turn, a set of wolf eyes can be seen resembling the former Big Bad Wolf logo.

== Rankings ==
Verbolten was ranked in the Amusement Today's Golden Ticket Awards for best new ride of 2012 with 7% of the vote, to come in fourth place.

Golden Ticket Awards: Best New Ride for 2012
Ranking	4

Golden Ticket Awards: Top steel Roller Coasters
Year									1998	1999
Ranking									–	–
Year	2000	2001	2002	2003	2004	2005	2006	2007	2008	2009
Ranking	–	–	–	–	–	–	–	–	–	–
Year	2010	2011	2012	2013	2014	2015	2016	2017	2018	2019
Ranking	–	–	–	–	–	–	–	–	36	38
Year	2020	2021	2022	2023	2024	2025				
Ranking	N/A	–	–	–	–	–				

== See also ==
- 2012 in amusement parks
- Polar X-plorer, a ride at Legoland Billund with a similar ride system
- Th13teen, the first roller coaster to introduce this ride system
