= Flyvende Ørn =

Roller coaster at Legoland Billund

Flyvende Ørn / Flying Eagle
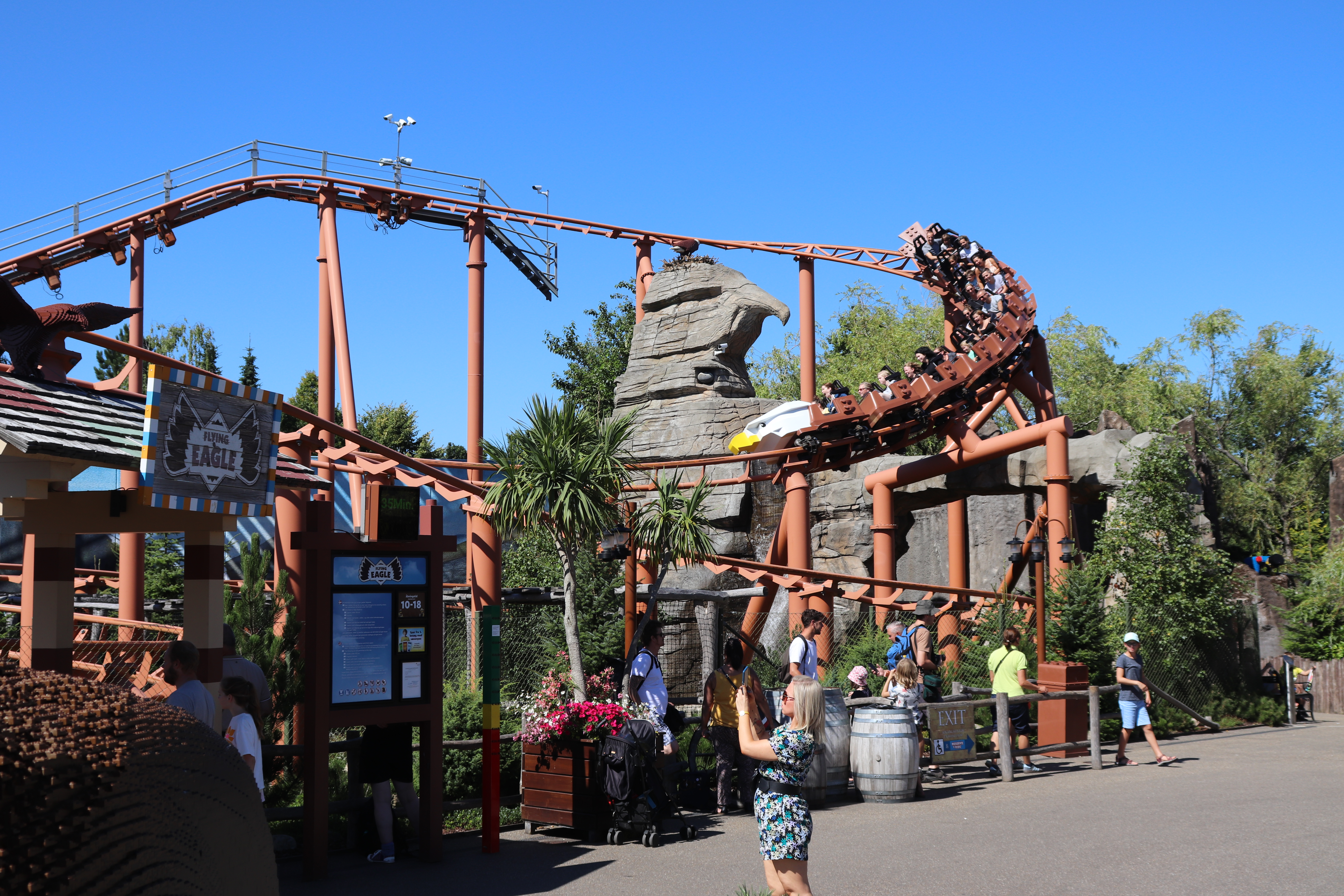
- Flyvende Ørn (2022)

Legoland Billund
- Location: Legoland Billund
- Park section: Legoredo Town
- Coordinates: 55.735347°N 9.125208°E
- Status: Operating
- Opening date: 2018

General statistics
- Type: Steel – Family
- Manufacturer: Zierer
- Designer: RP Rides
- Model: Custom
- Height: 11 m (36 ft)
- Length: 281 m (922 ft)
- Inversions: 0
- Capacity: 20 passengers per train riders per hour
- Restraint style: Lap bar

Flyvende Ørn or Flying Eagle is a roller coaster located at Legoland Billund in Billund, Denmark. The ride opened in 2018 as part of the park's 50th anniversary celebrations and is situated in the western-themed Legoredo Town area.

== History ==
Flying Eagle was announced as part of a major expansion of Legoredo Town to commemorate the park's 50th anniversary in 2018. The expansion included renovations to existing attractions such as Lego Canoe and covered an area of approximately 2,500 square metres.

The roller coaster was designed by Dutch coaster designer Romesh Popelier of RP Rides, marking his first realised roller coaster project. The design process allowed flexibility within predetermined constraints for size and layout, with final engineering validation performed before construction.

Construction of the attraction formed part of broader park improvements, including enhancements to the entrance and surrounding themed areas.

== Characteristics ==
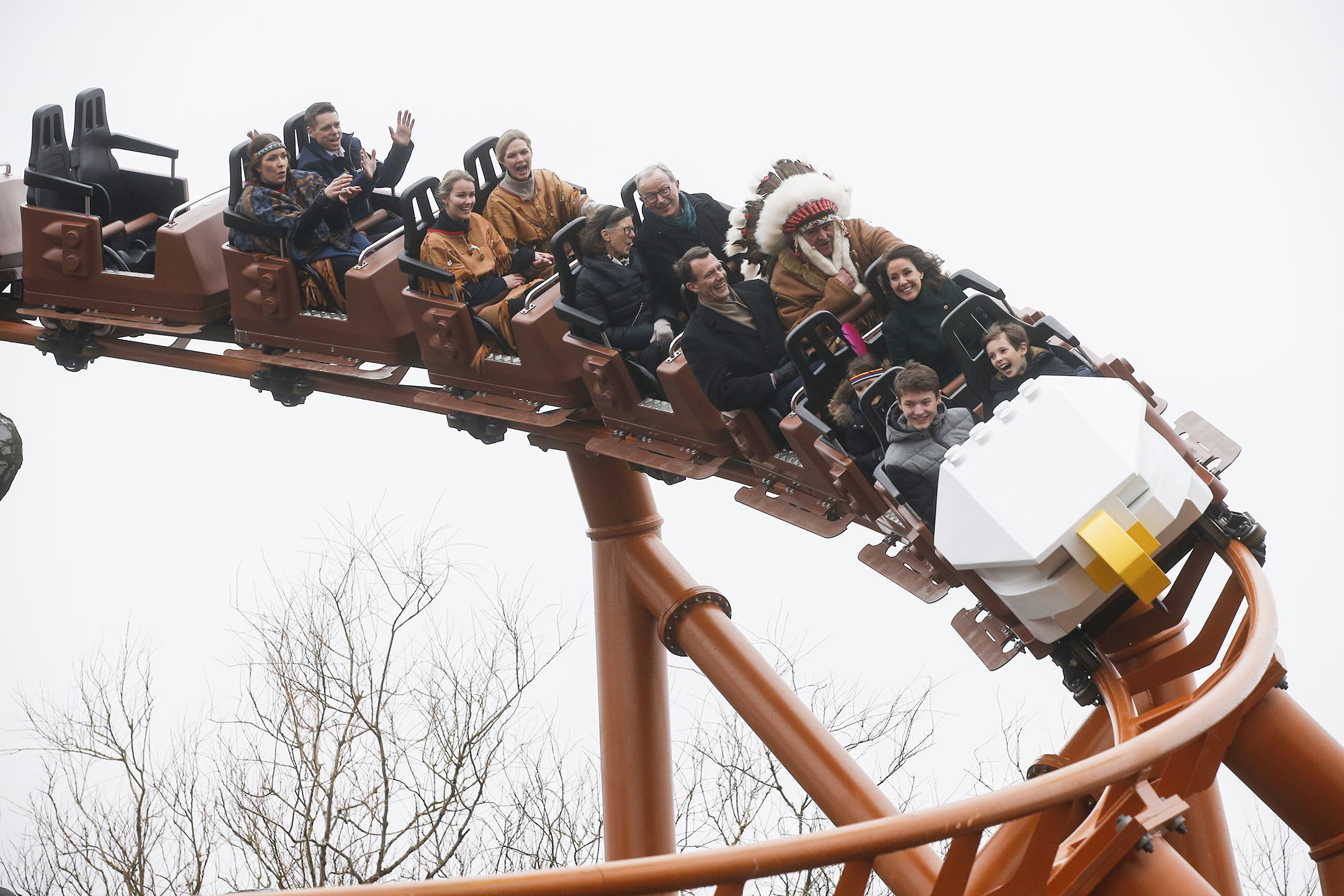
Flyvende Ørn in 2018

Flying Eagle is a family roller coaster manufactured by Zierer and reaches a height of 11 metres (36 ft) and a top speed of 46 kilometres per hour (29 mph) along a 281 metres (922 ft) track.

The attraction features a train accommodating up to 20 passengers and is designed to be accessible to families, with minimum height requirements for accompanied and unaccompanied riders.

== Ride experience ==
The ride is themed around flying on the back of an eagle through a landscape inspired by the Rocky Mountains.

Riders ascend to the top of a rock formation known as Ørneklippen (Eagle Rock), where an eagle nest with a mother and her chicks can be seen, before descending into a series of turns passing LEGO animal figures and scenery.

The attraction simulates a flight through a western-themed environment, incorporating rock formations, lakes, and prairie animals as part of the experience.
