= Falcon's Fury =

Ride at Busch Gardens Tampa Bay

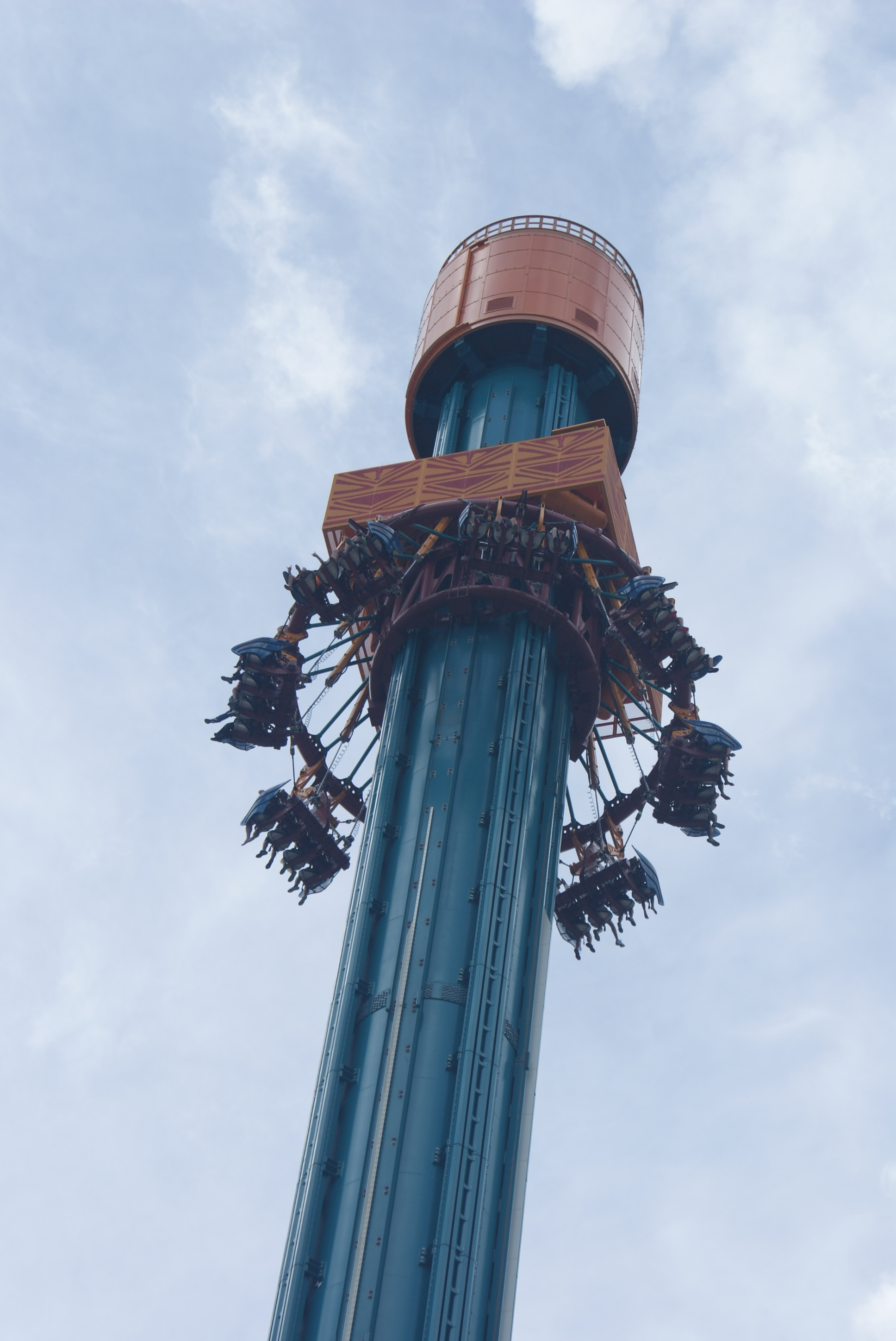
- Falcon's Fury logo and the ride in operation

Busch Gardens Tampa Bay
- Area: Pantopia
- Coordinates: 28°2′15.5″N 82°25′22″W
- Status: Operating
- Cost: US$5,000,000–6,000,000
- Soft opening date: August 16, 2014
- Opening date: September 2, 2014
- Replaced: Sandstorm

Ride statistics
- Attraction type: Drop tower
- Manufacturer: Intamin
- Model: Sky Jump
- Theme: Falcon
- Height: 335 ft (102 m)
- Drop: 310 ft (94 m)
- Speed: 60 mph (97 km/h)
- Site area: 3,600 sq ft (330 m^{2})
- G-force: 3.5
- Capacity: 800 riders per hour
- Vehicles: 1
- Riders per vehicle: 32
- Duration: 2:00
- Height restriction: 54–77 in (137–196 cm)
- Quick Queue available

Falcon's Fury is a free-standing Sky Jump drop tower attraction at Busch Gardens Tampa Bay amusement park in Tampa, Florida, United States. Manufactured by Intamin subsidiary Intaride, the ride reaches a maximum height of 335 feet (102 m), making it North America's tallest free-standing drop tower. Riders experience about five seconds of free fall, reaching a speed of 60 miles per hour (100 km/h). The ride's name was chosen to invoke a falcon's ability to dive steeply at high speed to capture prey.

The project was originally planned to begin in 2012 with the ride opening in 2013, but it was delayed by one year. Construction began in 2013 with a scheduled opening date of May 1, 2014; however, the opening was delayed due to mechanical and technical issues. Following a preview opening to park employees in early August and a soft opening on August 16, 2014, Falcon's Fury officially opened to the public on September 2, 2014. Public response to the ride has been positive, with reviewers praising the height of the tower and the drop experience.

== History ==
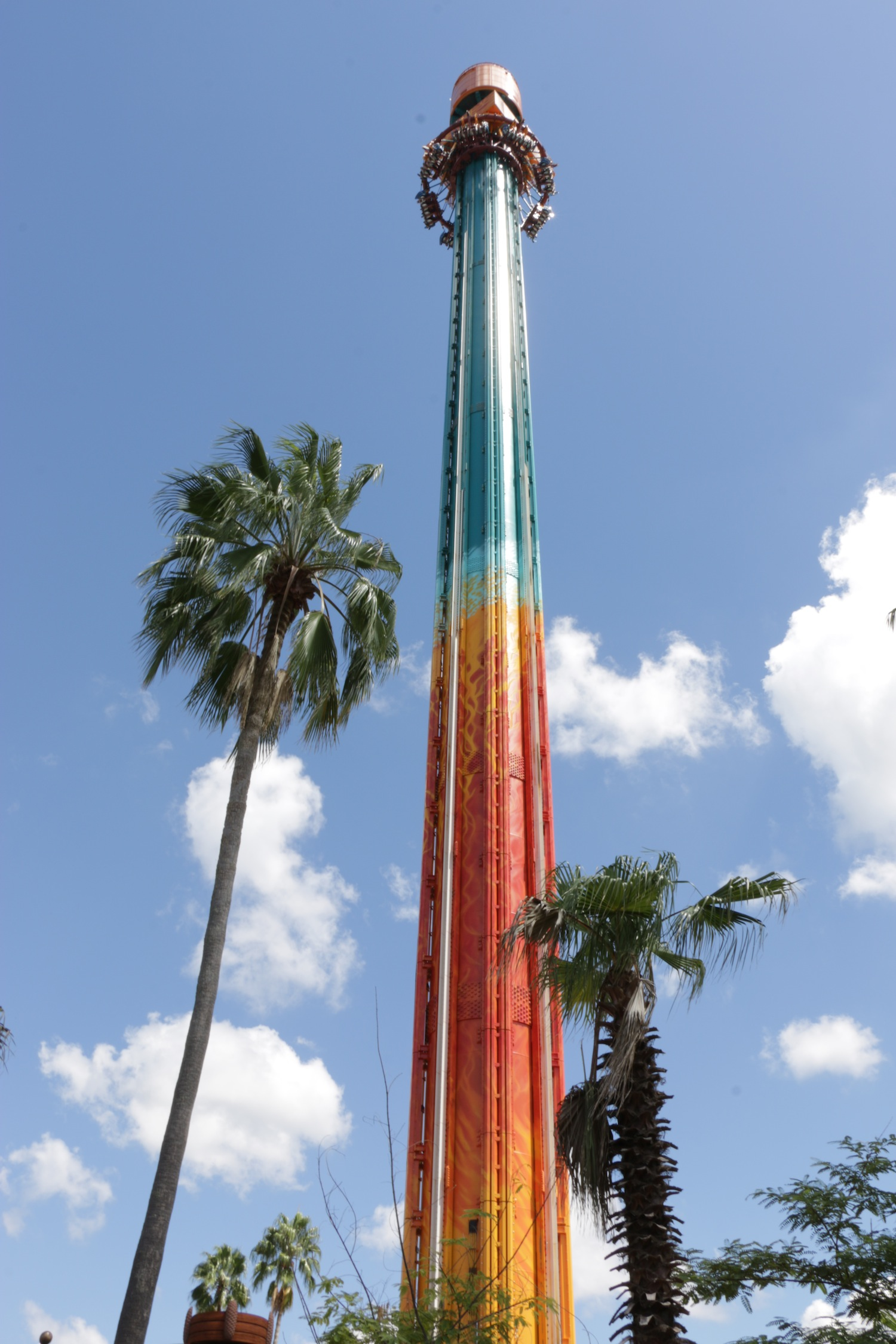
Falcon's Fury's tower

Planning for Falcon's Fury began around the time the park completed its Cheetah Hunt ride in 2011. Ground tests in the Timbuktu area (now known as Pantopia) revealed "interesting soil conditions", with steel beams and concrete required to reinforce the site.

Rumors that Busch Gardens Tampa might replace its Sandstorm ride with a 200-foot (61 m) drop tower surfaced in the fall of 2011 when Mäch Tower opened at its sister park, Busch Gardens Williamsburg, that August. Construction surveying was observed in January 2012. Two months later plans were filed with the city to build a drop tower, possibly for the 2013 season. Speculation about the new attraction's name began when SeaWorld Parks & Entertainment, owners of Busch Gardens Tampa, filed trademark applications for "Desert Dive" and "Falcon's Fury" on May 2 and July 11, 2012, respectively, and bought the DesertDive.com domain name. When permits for the new ride differed from those for Mäch Tower in November 2012, rumors began that the seats would tilt forward. Because of the height of the attraction, approval from the Federal Aviation Administration was required. According to the FAA and the city of Tampa, the tower was supposed to be built in December 2012 and open to the public in 2013. For reasons not publicly disclosed, the project was delayed, with its construction pushed back to the second half of 2013.

On May 31, 2013, it was announced that Sandstorm would close on June 2 to make room for a new attraction. About two weeks later, on June 11, Busch Gardens Tampa announced plans for Falcon's Fury and construction began that month. During the fourth quarter of 2013, the park drove steel piles for the ride's foundation nightly for about a month.

On September 20, the tower for Falcon's Fury was shipped from Spain in nine sections, arriving at the park near the end of October; the ride's smaller parts had been delivered earlier from several European countries. Installation of one of the nine tower pieces was planned for every other night, with the last piece in place by New Year's Eve. Construction was done by the Adena Corporation, and on November 18 the first piece was installed. The ride's second piece was installed on December 2, and two more were installed by December 6. The fifth section was placed by December 21, and the sixth was erected by New Year's Day. The seventh tower piece was installed by January 3, 2014, and the eighth by January 5, reaching a height of about 300 feet (91 m), and Falcon's Fury's gondola was seen at the park on January 12. The ride's counterweight was installed on January 22, and the tower was capped during the weekend of February 1. Work on the ride's electrical components then began. Assembly of the gondola was completed by the end of March. Testing was originally scheduled to begin in February, but due to construction delays the first drop tests were not made until April 15. Tower painting began in June, with its sunset motif estimated to take 60 hours over a three-week period.

At the end of February, Busch Gardens Tampa announced that Falcon's Fury would open on May 1, and on April 3 the park began a sweepstakes contest for its "Falcon's Fury First-to-Ride Party". A second, similar contest began on April 11, with 50 winners from each contest being among the first riders. A week later, the park announced that the ride's opening would be delayed, and several media events scheduled for April and May (including the First-to-Ride party) were cancelled. It was later disclosed that the delay was due to manufacturing and technical issues with the cables which pull the gondola up the tower. During the week of August 10, Falcon's Fury opened for park employees. On August 16 the ride soft-opened to the public, and two and a half weeks later Falcon's Fury officially opened.

Busch Gardens Tampa temporarily closed Falcon's Fury for inspection following the Orlando FreeFall accident at Icon Park in March 2022. The drop tower later reopened but then shortly closed thereafter for regular maintenance. After a year of closure due to supply chain delays, the park announced Falcon's Fury would reopen for the Spring 2023 season.

== Ride experience ==
Falcon's Fury has two shaded queue lines: a standby line which can hold guests for about 45 minutes, and a Quick Queue for guests with passes that allow them to bypass the standby line. Riders must be between 54 inches (137 cm) and 77 inches (196 cm).

When the riders are seated a catch car connects to the gondola and raises it to the top of the tower, which takes about one minute. Although the tower is 335 feet (102 m) high, the gondola stops 25 feet (7.6 m) lower. When it reaches the maximum height the seats tilt forward, with a computer-randomized wait time from one to five seconds. When the wait time ends, the gondola is released from the catch car into a five-second free fall reaching a maximum speed of 60 miles per hour (97 km/h). As the gondola passes through the pre-braking section, the seats rotate back into a vertical position. After the pre-brake the gondola enters the main magnetic-brake run, where riders experience approximately 3.5 g (34 m/s^{2}) of deceleration as the gondola slows. When it comes to a full stop at the base of the tower, the riders disembark. One cycle of the ride lasts about one and a half minutes. Busch Gardens Tampa placed an Easter egg in the form of a painted Falcon's Fury logo on top of one of its buildings, which can be seen only from a certain side of the gondola.

== Characteristics ==
The tower and gondola were manufactured by Intaride, a subsidiary of Intamin. The ride covers an area of about 3,600 square feet (330 m^{2}).

=== Tower ===
The Falcon's Fury tower is 335 feet (102 m) tall, the third tallest free-standing drop tower in North America, and can bend 3 feet (0.9 m) in any direction from the top to withstand hurricane-force winds. The tower is composed of nine sections, including the machine house. Each piece of the tower weighs up to 105 tonnes (103 long tons; 116 short tons), and the entire structure weighs about 519 tonnes (511 long tons; 572 short tons). The 77 tonnes (76 long tons; 85 short tons) machine house at the top contains four DC motors used to lift the gondola. Inside the tower is a 68 tonnes (67 long tons; 75 short tons) counterweight, composed of hundreds of lead weights, to help raise the gondola. The tower's foundation is made up of 105 steel piles, varying in depth from 75 feet (23 m) to 205 feet (62 m). A 138-foot (42 m) eddy current brake system on the tower slows the gondola after its free fall. The structure is painted yellow, aqua and two shades of red.

=== Gondola ===
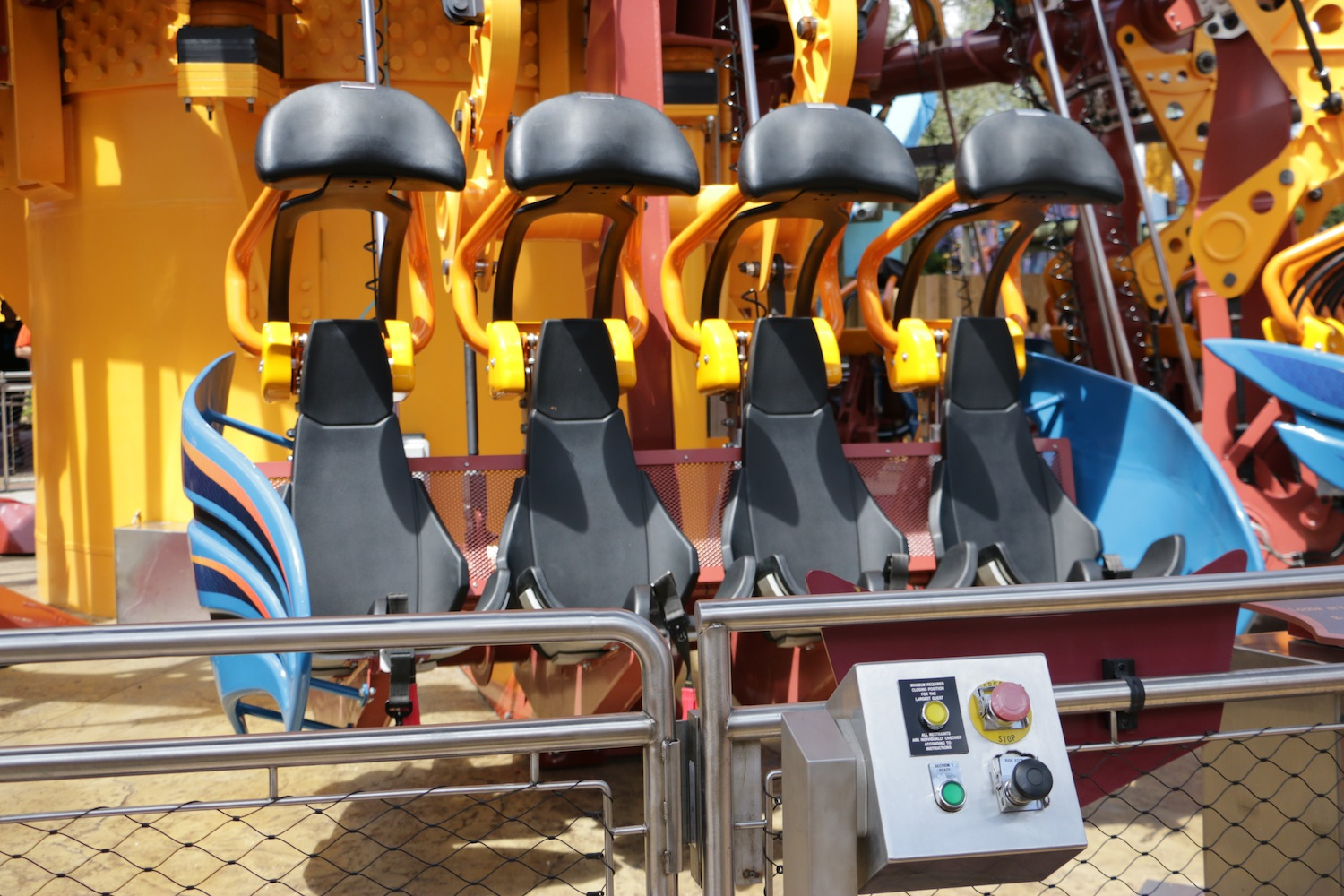
One of the ride's eight groups of seats

The ride's single gondola has 32 seats, grouped octagonally around the tower. Each of the eight sides seats four riders, and each seat has an over-the-shoulder restraint and seat belt. Falcon's Fury can theoretically accommodate 800 riders per hour. Carbon-fiber wings buttress each end of a group of seats, protecting outside riders' arms and legs during the drop. The gondola reaches a height of 310 feet (94 m), 25 feet (7.6 m) below the top of the tower. When it reaches its maximum height the seats tilt 90 degrees forward, with the riders facing the ground (the first use of this feature on a drop tower).

== Records ==
When Falcon's Fury opened it became North America's tallest free-standing drop tower. Although taller drop towers exist on the continent—such as Lex Luthor: Drop of Doom at Six Flags Magic Mountain and Zumanjaro: Drop of Doom at Six Flags Great Adventure, which reach drop heights of 400 feet (120 m) and 415 feet (126 m) respectively—those attractions were added to existing structures. Despite its height, the ride's maximum speed of 60 miles per hour (97 km/h) does not set a speed record. Other drop towers—such as Drop Tower: Scream Zone at Kings Dominion, which reaches 72 miles per hour (116 km/h)—are faster. However, Falcon's Fury is the world's first drop tower whose seats tilt 90 degrees. Although tilting seats were first used by Intamin in 2001 on Acrophobia at Six Flags Over Georgia, their tilt angle is smaller.

== Reception ==
The initial reception after the ride's announcement was positive. According to Lance Hart, a theme park enthusiast from Screamscape, "Instead of selling your picture ... they should sell baby wipes and clean underwear at the exit" and the ride could be the most frightening drop tower in the world. Robb Alvey of Theme Park Review called the ride the world's best drop tower, later ranking it one of the top 14 new attractions for 2014; Dave Parfitt and Arthur Levine of USA Today ranked Falcon's Fury in their top ten. Brady MacDonald of the Los Angeles Times originally ranked Falcon's Fury his seventh-most-anticipated ride for 2014; on an updated list, he ranked it 17th.

For safety reasons, construction on Falcon's Fury was done primarily at night. Residents near the park complained about noise from the pile driver during the laying of the foundation, and complaints about the ride's operating noise continued into August 2014.

According to the park and Twitter posts selected by news media, public response during the soft opening was positive; Total Orlando gave the ride five stars for teenagers and four stars for adults. On Coaster101.com "Ashley" said that although the restraints were tight, they were comfortable and not as tight as those on other rides, adding: "The drop on Falcon's Fury is different from any ride I have ever ridden. The best way I can describe it is that instead of leaving your stomach at the top of the tower, you take it with you to the bottom." According to Florida Trip Guides, the ride was a good addition to the park's attraction lineup: "Falcon's Fury is not for the faint of heart. I have ridden dozens of drop towers but this one is different. Something about facing straight down and falling really makes you nervous." Robert Niles of Theme Park Insider said that Falcon's Fury and other recent attractions were nearing the extreme of human tolerance; as a result, "You're getting to the point where instead of making an attraction more popular by having it achieve some type of record, you're actually limiting the audience for that." Randi Nissenbaum of Bay News 9 called the view from the top of the tower incredible, and although she was nervous at first she wanted to ride again. Sue Carlton of the Tampa Bay Times said, "it was terrifying and thrilling and I held on as hard as I could and yelled and closed my eyes and afterward stepped off rubber-kneed and exhilarated."

For the 2014 season, Busch Gardens Tampa expected attendance to increase by three to eight percent. However, IBISWorld Research predicted in June 2014 that combined attendance for the second quarter of the year had increased by about 0.3 percent for SeaWorld Orlando, SeaWorld San Diego, SeaWorld San Antonio, Busch Gardens Williamsburg and Busch Gardens Tampa. Compared to the same period in 2013, combined attendance for the first half of the year dropped by just over four percent. Busch Gardens Tampa blamed the lack of anticipated attendance increase partially on the delays in Falcon's Fury's construction.
