= Big Bad Wolf (roller coaster) =

Former ride at Busch Gardens Williamsburg

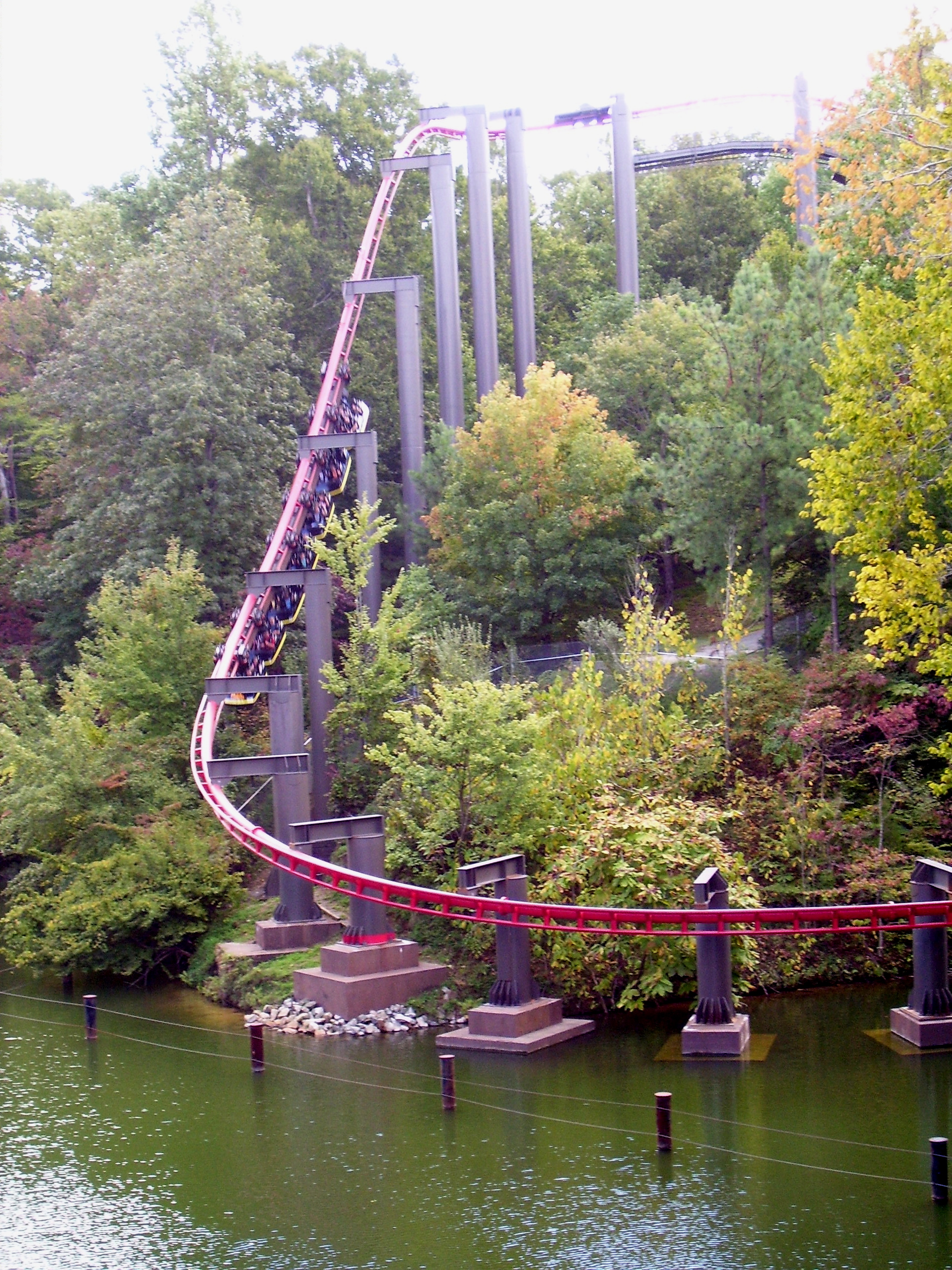
- The 80-foot (24 m) drop over the Rhine River.

Busch Gardens Williamsburg
- Location: Busch Gardens Williamsburg
- Park section: Oktoberfest
- Coordinates: 37°14′00.5″N 76°38′41.5″W
- Status: Removed
- Opening date: June 15, 1984
- Closing date: September 7, 2009
- Cost: $6,000,000
- Replaced by: Verbolten

General statistics
- Type: Steel – Suspended
- Manufacturer: Arrow Dynamics
- Designer: Ron Toomer
- Model: Suspended roller coaster
- Track layout: Terrain
- Height: 100 ft (30 m)
- Drop: 80 ft (24 m)
- Length: 2,800 ft (850 m)
- Speed: 48 mph (77 km/h)
- Inversions: 0
- Duration: 3:00
- G-force: 4.0
- Height restriction: 42 in (107 cm)
- Trains: 3 trains with 7 cars; riders arranged 2 across in 2 rows for a total of 28 riders per train
- Big Bad Wolf at RCDB

Big Bad Wolf was a suspended roller coaster in the Oktoberfest section of Busch Gardens Williamsburg. Designed by Arrow Dynamics, the roller coaster opened to the public on June 15, 1984. The Big Bad Wolf celebrated its 25th Anniversary on June 15th, 2009. The ride was in service for 25 years before closing permanently on September 7, 2009. The footers, queue line, and station were re-purposed for Verbolten, a roller coaster that was introduced in 2012.

== History ==
Prior to the construction of Big Bad Wolf, Anton Schwarzkopf had designed a prototype ("Flying Coaster") for the park. Even though three-quarters of the new ride had been built, the ride was never completed, and was later completely scrapped. Busch Gardens then handed the contract to Arrow Dynamics. After the failure of The Bat at Kings Island, the company improved their suspended roller coaster concept with banked turns and brakes above the trains.

On November 10, 1983, Busch Gardens Williamsburg announced that they would be building a new Arrow suspended coaster. It would be named Big Bad Wolf and would open in 1984, along with XLR-8 at Six Flags AstroWorld in Houston, Texas. Big Bad Wolf was supposed to open on March 18, but its opening was delayed until June.

After Arrow Dynamics went bankrupt in 2002, spare parts for Big Bad Wolf became more expensive and harder to find. The forces of the ride often wore out the trains and track. The location, intensity and lack of spare parts made Big Bad Wolf harder to maintain. The park would have to replace millions of dollars' worth in parts to keep it running, but repairing was far beyond their resources.

On July 24, 2009, it was announced that the Big Bad Wolf would be retired after 25 years of operation. It officially closed on September 7, 2009. The ride vehicle, signage and safety rules sign were donated to the National Roller Coaster Museum. The land once occupied by Big Bad Wolf was cleared afterwards to make room for the construction of Verbolten, a new roller coaster that opened at the park in 2012.

While the Drachen Fire roller coaster was in operation from 1992 to 1998, guests waiting in its line queue could view the Big Bad Wolf's village-themed area of the ride, as the pathway was situated nearby and offered a viewing area. Access to the viewing area was closed following Drachen Fire's demise in 1998. The final drop and turns were still visible to guests on the Rhinefield Bridge area of the park, which continues to provide unobstructed views of Verbolten.

In October 2024, Busch Gardens announced another successor to Big Bad Wolf, named Big Bad Wolf: The Wolf's Revenge. This ride is an inverted coaster by Bolliger & Mabillard and uses the same station building as Drachen Fire. The ride opened May 23, 2025.

== Ride experience ==
=== Layout ===
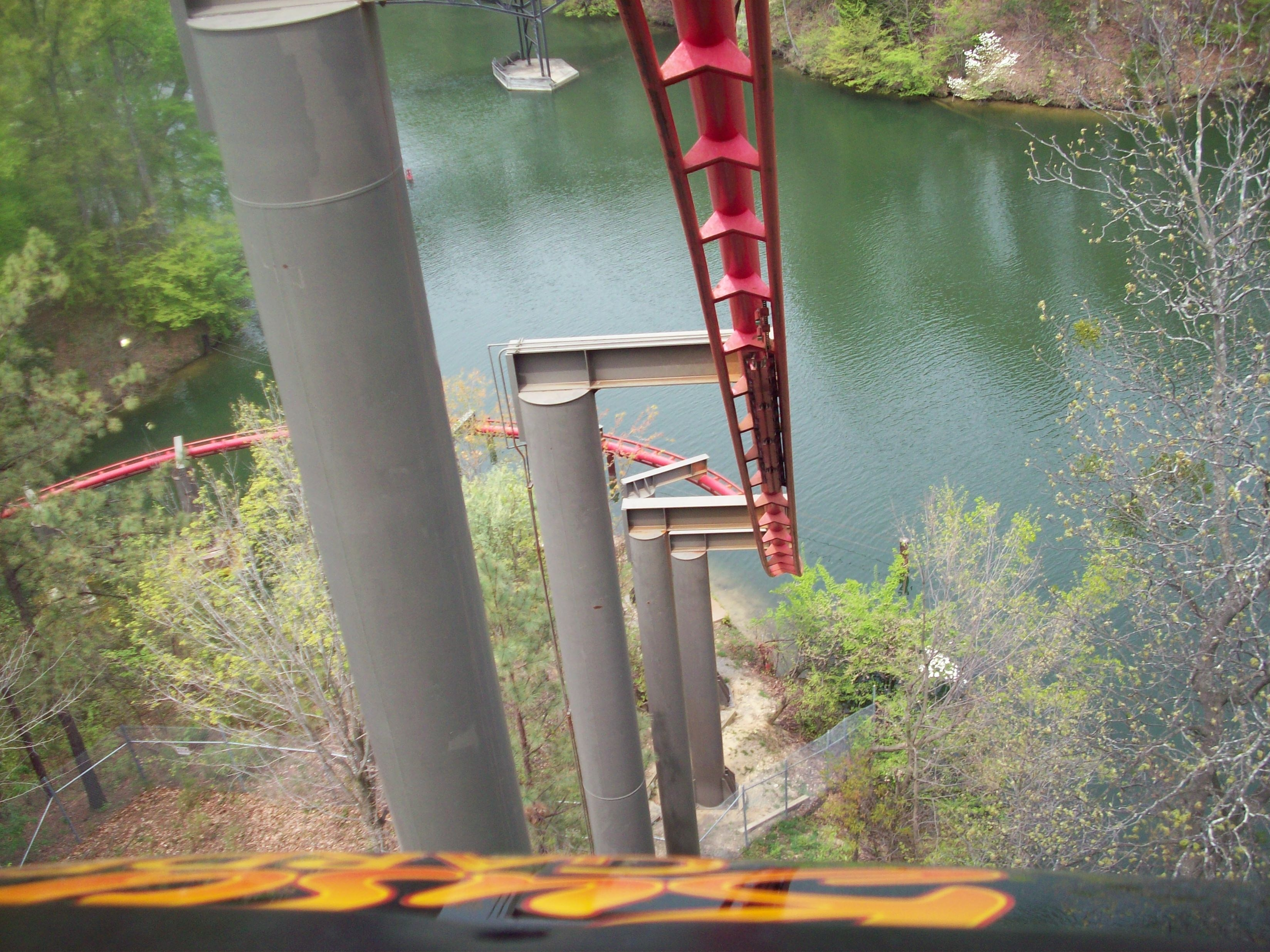
Big Bad Wolf's last steep drop. At top, a trim brake was added halfway down this drop during its opening.

Following a safety announcement and recorded departure message, "Thank you and enjoy traveling at the speed of fright!", the ride started out with two small dips out of the station, turning left then right before ascending the first lift hill. It then traveled down the first drop. The train would then steer its way through a mock Bavarian village, narrowly missing houses and shops. The ride completed three turns, first to the left, then the right, then the left, each of approximately 180 degrees. After the third turn, the ride hit a straight piece of track, then headed towards a helix through a wooded area adjacent to the village.

The train then entered a set of block brakes. Following the brakes, the train then turned right, and began to ascend a second lift hill. The second lift hill climbed towards the park's mock Rhine River. At the top of the 100-foot (30 m) lift, the ride turned 90 degrees to the left, before traveling down the climatic 80-foot (24 m) drop, barreling straight towards the river at 48 miles per hour (77 kilometres per hour), swooping to the left in close proximity to the water.

Originally, mist machines were used to enhance the effect that the train was too close to the water. In the early 1990s, however, the mist machines were removed. After passing by the mist machines, the train made a 180 degree turn up and to the right, followed by a straight section where the trains would swing freely, before a final 180 degree left hand turn into the final brake run, which then returned riders to the boarding station.

=== Trains ===
The ride used three trains, each comprising seven cars with four seats in each, for a total capacity of 28 riders per train.

== Incidents ==
On May 2, 1993, a park employee was struck and killed by a moving train while working in a restricted area. According to his family, he was sent into a restricted area of the ride to clear a fallen branch that was obstructing the view of one of the ride's security cameras. Two guests on the ride who saw the man before impact claimed that he appeared to be unaware of the oncoming train. The ride was closed for a week during the investigation. The employee's family attempted to sue Busch Entertainment Inc., but a judge dismissed the case because of a state law that prevented the recovery of civil damages for job-related injuries.

On March 1, 2003, a contractor hired to perform off-season painting work was killed while painting the Big Bad Wolf. The man was painting on a high-reach vehicle which overturned. James City County fire officials said the man was dead by the time they reached him.

== Rankings ==
Golden Ticket Awards: Top steel Roller Coasters
Year									1998	1999
Ranking									9	15
Year	2000	2001	2002	2003	2004	2005	2006	2007	2008	2009
Ranking	23	26	31	42	39	27	30	32 (tie)	34	24
Year	2010	2011	2012	2013	2014	2015	2016	2017	2018	2019
Ranking	–	–	–	–	–	–	–	–	–	–
Year	2020	2021	2022	2023	2024	2025	2026			
Ranking	N/A	–	–	–	–	–	–			
