= Legoland Billund Resort =

Original Legoland Park

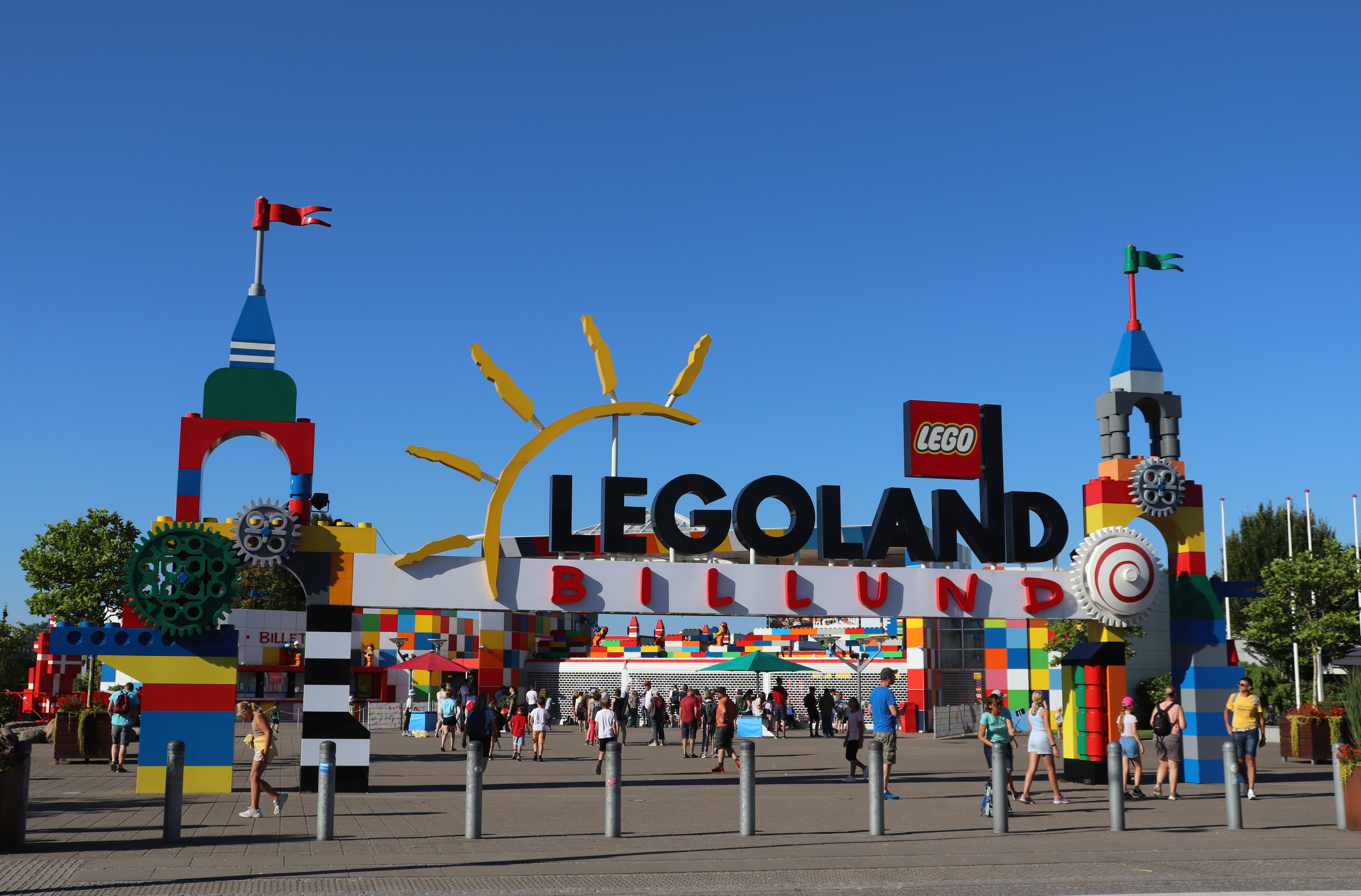
- Interactive map of Legoland Billund Resort
- Location: Billund, Denmark
- Coordinates: 55°44′8″N 9°7′34″E
- Opened: 7 June 1968; 58 years ago
- Owner: Merlin Entertainments
- Slogan: The happiest place in the Happiest Country on Earth
- Operating season: March – December
- Attendance: 1.95 million (2019) o
- Area: 14 ha (35 acres)

Attractions
- Total: 50
- Roller coasters: 4
- Water rides: 3
- Website: www.legoland.dk/en/

Legoland Billund Resort (also known as Legoland Denmark), the original Legoland park, opened on 7 June 1968 in Billund, Denmark. The park is located next to the original Lego factory and Billund Airport, Denmark's second-busiest airport. Over 1.9 million guests visited the park in 2011, and 50 million guests have visited the park since it opened. This makes Legoland the largest tourist attraction in Denmark outside Copenhagen. The Legoland parks that have since been built are modelled upon Legoland Billund, most noticeably the Miniland area, which is made up of more than 20 million plastic Lego bricks.

== History ==
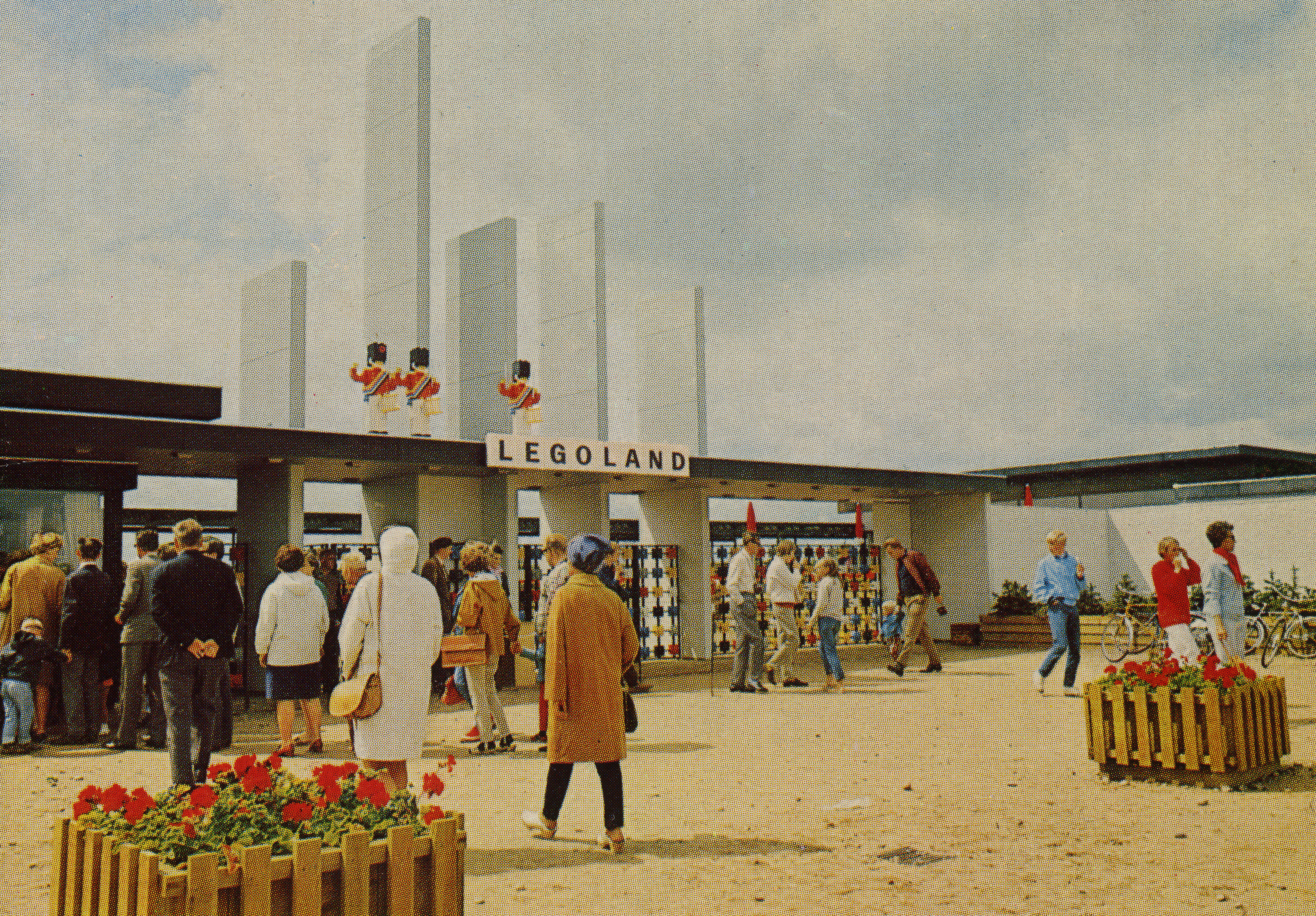
Entrance gates (1968)

The Lego company, led by Ole Kirk Christiansen, introduced plastic toys alongside their existing wooden toy line in 1949 after purchasing one of the first injection moulding machines in 1947. One son, Godtfred Kirk Christiansen (GKC), was named the managing director of the family business in 1957 shortly before his father died and just two years later he bought out his three brothers. In the 1960s, GKC decided to open a 14-acre (5.7 ha) Legoland Park adjacent to the Lego factory in Billund to promote his toy business; the factory itself was already drawing approximately 20,000 visitors per year by the mid-1960s, who came to view models produced for trade shows and shops. GKC hired Arnold Boutrop as the park's first general director and designer; after visiting Madurodam, the two men began finalizing plans for what would become Miniland, the main attraction of Legoland. Dagny Holm, a cousin of GKC trained as a sculptor who was hired as a model designer in 1961 is credited with much of the original design and building of Miniland. The park became an instant success, with 625,000 visitors in its first abbreviated season after opening on 7 June 1968.

Over the years, Legoland Billund has added many original models and rides. The park, which has now been expanded to cover 45 acres (18 ha), is divided into nine themed areas, including Duplo Land, Imagination Zone, LEGOREDO Town, Adventure Land, Lego City, Knight's Kingdom, Mini Land, Pirate Land, and Polar Land.

Miniland in Legoland Billund (1968)

Today, Legoland Billund is the most visited tourist attraction in Jutland and the third-most visited attraction in Denmark, after Tivoli Gardens and Dyrehavsbakken. Several other Legolands have since been built in other parts of the world:

- Legoland Windsor Resort (1996)
- Legoland California (1999)
- Legoland Deutschland Resort (2002)
- Legoland Florida (2011)
- Legoland Malaysia Resort (2012)
- Legoland Dubai (2016)
- Legoland Japan Resort (2017)
- Legoland New York (2021)
- Legoland Korea Resort (2022)

The Blackstone Group, an investment firm, bought a 70% controlling stake in Legoland in 2005, with the remaining 30% still owned by Lego. The parks are operated by Merlin Entertainments.

On 29 May 2024, a fire suspected to have been caused by a short circuit inside an electric rail car that was being charged overnight erupted at the park's Miniland attraction, destroying several replicas of famous buildings and a model of a traditional Danish port.

== Themed Lego Lands ==
Themed areas and key locations within Legoland Billund Resort

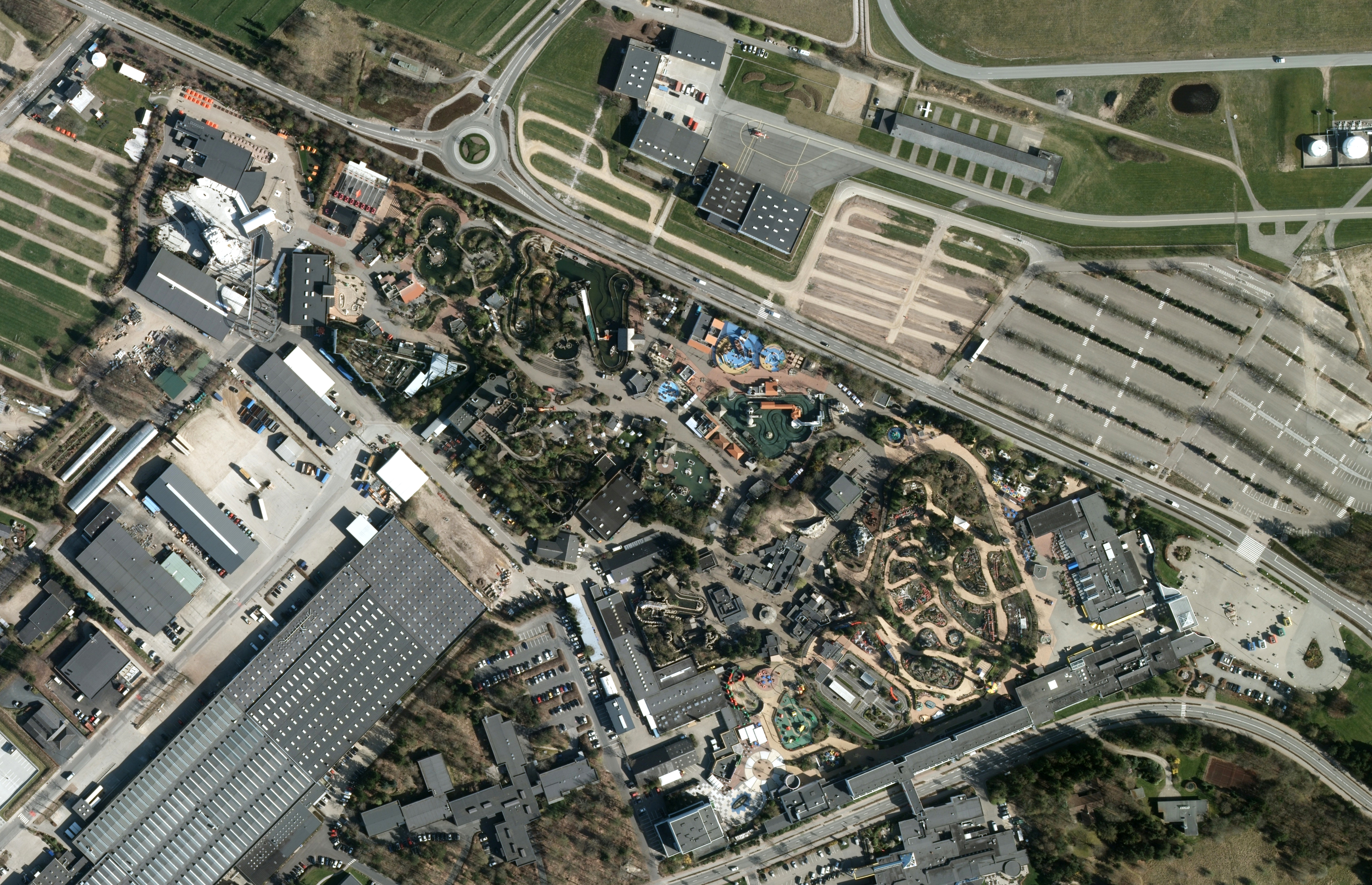
Aerial photograph (2015)

As of 2024, the park has 11 themed areas.

=== Adventure Land ===
This area contains some of the park's more exciting rides such as the wild mouse roller coaster, X-treme Racers. Jungle Racers jet ski ride has a jungle theme and spins the riders quite fast. In 2010, The Temple was introduced, an indoor ride where riders board Explorer SUVs and are equipped with laser guns to shoot at moving targets in 11 scenes themed to ancient Egypt. The Temple also has a game area with an Egyptian theme, containing ring-toss, water-shooting, balloon-popping and a mummy game. The area contains two gift shops (Temple Gifts and Adventure Shop) and two restaurants. Falck Fire Brigade is a ride where you take your assigned vehicle to the scene of a fire where you and your fellow firefighters have to put out a fire in a building, and the fastest team wins.

=== Duplo Land ===
Duplo Land (formerly known as Fabuland) contains rides and attractions for young children, with the Lego Duplo brand name. The Duplo Playhouse is a play area for children ages 2–6, which is themed like a city in which children can play. They can build using Lego, or play on planes and cars. There are also slides, stairs, interactive elements and a role-play area. The Duplo Train, a train ride that looks like a train made of Duplo bricks, takes two minutes to complete its loop. Duplo Planes is a plane ride similar to Disney's Dumbo ride, but with a Lego theme. The land also used to feature Duplo Driving School. This was a car ride for children ages 2–6, who are not yet ready for the Traffic School ride.

=== Duplo Peppa Pig Playground ===
For 2024, a new play area themed to the Peppa Pig television series was opened behind Lego studies. This is part of a joint partnership between Lego, Hasbro and Merlin Entertainments.

=== Imagination Zone ===
This zone contains the Lego Studios, a purpose-built 600-seat 4-D theater, complete with special effects and a giant screen.

Atlantis by Sea Life was added in 2007. The attraction starts off with an animated movie, featuring Lego figures and a submarine that travels down to the submerged city of Atlantis. There is also a Sea Life aquarium featuring a walk-through underwater tunnel and other hands-on activities with more than 800 sea creatures. Numerous Lego figures and models are in and around the aquarium.

=== Knight's Kingdom ===
Knight's Kingdom contains The Dragon coaster, located inside a medieval castle. The ride starts with a slow-moving dark ride scene with Lego figures themed to medieval times, including a mighty dragon. Knight's Kingdom also has Knight's Barbecue Grill.

=== LEGO Movie World ===
It features the Masters of Flight and Unikitty's Disco Drop found in the California and Florida versions with its exclusive ride being a Technical Park Aerobat.

=== LEGOREDO Town ===
LEGOREDO Town is a Western-themed land that contains the rides Lego Canoe, LEGOLDMINE, Westernride and ghost The hunted House. LEGOREDO also has its own band called "The Rattlesnakes" and they play country music all day long. The mountain terrain of Lego Canoe offers a scenic background.

=== Mini Land ===
Miniland is the heart of any Legoland park. The 1:20 scale Lego brick models feature landscapes, sights and buildings from all over Denmark, as well as famous landmarks from other parts of the world. The LEGOTop observation tower is a place to view the entire park. The models and structures in Mini Land were made using more than 25 million Lego bricks.

Country	Added	Closed	Image	Description
Denmark	1968	–		Featuring models of Billund Airport, Copenhagen (Amalienborg Palace, Nyhavn), Dybbøl Mill, Klampenborg Station, Lilleby (a fictional village), Møgeltønder, Ribe, and Skagen.
Egypt	?	–		Featuring model of Abu Simbel temples.
Germany	?	–		Featuring models of Düsseldorf (promenade along the Rhine), Neuschwanstein Castle, and Tegernsee
The Netherlands	?	–		Featuring models of Amsterdam and the surrounding landscape.
Norway	?	–		Featuring models of Bergen and its harbor.
Scotland	?	–		Featuring models of Crail and Eilean Donan.
Star Wars	2011	2019		Models removed shortly after Disney purchased the Star Wars franchise.
Sweden	?	–		Featuring models of the Gota Canal.
Thailand	?	–		Featuring model of The Grand Palace.
United States	?	–		Featuring models of Hollywood, Kennedy Space Center, and the United States Capitol Building.

=== Ninjago World ===
Ninjago World, which opened in 2016, features NINJAGO: The Ride, an interactive dark ride using gesture controls. The technology was developed by Triotech, who had previously developed the interactive Voyage to the Iron Reef dark ride at Knott's Berry Farm.

Annual attendance at Legoland Billund
Year	Attendance	Ref.
2005	1,490,000	
2006	1,460,000	
2007	1,610,000	
2008	1,650,000	
2009	1,650,000	
2010	1,650,000	
2011	1,600,000	
2012	1,650,000	
2013	1,800,000	
2014	1,925,000	
2015	2,050,000	
2016	2,091,000	
2017	2,120,000	

=== Pirate Land ===
Pirate Land is a pirate-themed area. It features the Pirate Splash Battle where participants get wet. Other rides include Pirate Wave Breaker and Pirate Boats.

=== Polar Land ===
Polar Land is a North Pole and South Pole theme area that opened in 2012. This themed area was partially created from part of the Lego City themed area and the Event Center. It features the Polar X-plorer roller coaster, Builde a boat, arctic basecamp and Ice Pilots School.

Ice Pilots School was previously named Power Builders and carried a Bionicle theme when it was part of the Lego City themed area.

== Attractions ==
=== Roller coasters ===
Ride name	Manufacturer	Year opened	Themed land	Image	Additional information
Dragen; The Dragon	Mack Rides	1997	Knight's Kingdom		Starts inside the medieval castle with a large dragon intimidating the riders; height limit 100 cm.
Flyvende Ørn; Flying Eagle	Zierer	2018	LEGOREDO Town		A family coaster where you plunge from Eagle Rock 11 m (36 ft) above the ground
Polar X-plorer	Zierer	2012	Polar Land		A Polar-themed family coaster that reaches a speed of 65 km/h with a 5-meter freefall drop section; height limit 120 cm.
X-Treme Racers	Mack Rides	2002	Adventure Land		A Wild mouse coaster that reaches a speed of 56 km/h (35 mph) on a 400-meter-long (1,300 ft) track (1312 ft) and a height of 16 m (52 ft); height limit 120 cm.
Minifigure Speedway	Zierer	2026			A duelling roller coaster that will reach speeds of 56 km/h (35 mph) across a pair of 244-meter-long (801 ft) tracks, which are taken in both forwards and reverse directions.

=== Water rides ===
Ride name	Type	Year opened	Themed land	Image	Additional information
Jungle Racers	Carousel (dual)	2000	Adventure Land		Water jet ski ride
Lego Canoe	Log flume	1992	LEGOREDO Town		
Pirate Boats	Dark ride	1991	Pirate Land		Renovated 2024
Pirate Splash Battle	Rail-based	2008	Pirate Land		Splash battle water shootout on a 150 m-long (490 ft) course

=== Other rides ===
Ride name	Type	Year opened	Themed land	Image	Additional information
Caterpillar	Himalaya	1971	Miniland		Rider height minimum 90 cm. Moved to its new position in 1983
Falck Fire Brigade	Fire fighting	2006	Adventureland		douse the fire yourself
Ghost - The Haunted House	Walkthrough dark ride/drop tower	2014	LEGOREDO Town		a walkthrough attraction with a drop tower at the end
Lego Atlantis	Aquarium	2007	Imagination Zone		a sea life aquarium
Lego Studios	4D film theater	2001	Imagination Zone		a 4D theater in Imagination Zone that as of 2019 shows 2 movies — Lego Ninjago 4D and LEGO® City 4D – Officer in Pursuit
Lego Top	Observation tower	1984	Miniland		36 m high
Lego Train	Train ride	1968	Miniland		a themed 2-minute train ride
Lloyd's Lazer Maze	Maze	2016	Ninjago World		a laser maze ride
Monorail	Monorail	1985	Miniland		
Lego Ninjago The Ride	Interactive dark ride	2016	Ninjago World		a dark ride where riders use their hands to shoot
Nintendo Game Show	Play area		Miniland		play Nintendo games
Pirate Carousel	Teacups		Pirate Land		spinning cups
The Temple	Interactive dark ride	2010	Adventureland		dark ride laser shoot-out

=== Kiddie rides ===
Ride name	Type	Year opened	Themed land	Image	Additional information
Adventure Path	Play area	2000	Adventureland		play area in Adventureland
Duplo Planes	Carousel	1984	Duplo Land		airplanes, built where caterpillar was
Duplo Playhouses	Play area	2001	Miniland		play area
Duplo Express	Train ride	1994	Duplo Land		a 2-minute train ride
Frog Hopper	Drop tower	2009	Miniland		mini drop tower
Lego Safari	On-track driving	1972	Miniland		on track cars on a Safari. Renovated 2017
Lego Duplo Peppa Pig	Children's Play Area	2024	Duplo Peppa Pig Playground		Themed to the children's show of the same name, part of a three-way partnership between Lego, Hasbro, and Merlin Entertainments.
LEGONDOL	Ferris wheel	1984	Duplo Land		mini Ferris wheel, Renovated in 2025/26 replaced with new design
Mini Boats	Boat ride	1971	Miniland		where children can sail their own boats. Renovated 2022
Music Fountain	Play area	2001	Imagination Zone		water play area. Renovated in 2026, with the old models replaced by new ones.
Pirate Wave Breaker	Rocking tug	2009	Pirate Land		90+ cm
SEAT Traffic School	Driving simulator	1968	Miniland		electric cars for 7 – 13 years old
Western Ride	Carousel	1988	LEGOREDO Town		Western themed carousel

=== Building experiences ===
Attraction	Year opened	Location	Image	Additional information
Lego Gallery	2022	At the entrance		Display MOCs from all over the world
Ferrari build and drive	2023	Brick Street		Build a ferrari and test it
Duplo Fun	2022	Brick Street		World full of Duplo bricks
Creative Workshop	2022	Brick Street		A master builder guides you through building a model
The Great Lego Reef	2022	Brick Street		Water themed
Monster Wall	2021	Brick Street		'Scary' monsters for everybody
Build a Boat – Polar	2022	Polar land		Build a fast boat and race against others
Build a Boat – Legoredo	2022	Legoredo		Build a fast boat and race against others
Arctic basecamp	2024	Polar land		Build arctic Explorer vehicles and Explorer the ICE cave

=== Shows ===
Attraction	Type	Year opened	Themed land	Image	Additional information
The Rattlesnakes	Country & western band		LEGOREDO Town		
King's Castle Show	Live action	Open in 1996 and closed in 2024	Knight's Kingdom		action and stunt show at Mini Castle
Legoland Garden	Marching Band		throughout		the park's marching band
Battle of the brick	Live action	2019 but closed in 2020 and reopened in 2023	Behind Polar land		action and stunt show

=== Extras ===
These attractions and activities all require an extra charge in addition to regular admission fees.

Attraction	Type	Year opened	Themed land	Image	Additional information
Legoldmine	Gold panning	1973	LEGOREDO Town		Renovated 2021
Pirate Games	Skill games		Pirate Land		test your skill games
Temple Games	Arcade		Adventureland		

=== Special events ===
The park hosts many special events throughout the season, including a Halloween celebration and firework shows.

=== Retired rides and attractions ===
Ride name	Type	Years	Themed land	Image	Additional information
FABULAND CARS	Driving simulator	?-1982	Fabuland		For kids under 8, replaced by FABULAND MERRY-GO-AROUND
Pony Riding	Horse Ride	1969-1991	LEGOREDO Town		replaced by Lego Canoe
FABULAND MERRY-GO-AROUND	Carousel	1983–?	Fabuland		Like the LEGO sets 3668
Duplo Driving School	Driving simulator		Duplo Land		electric cars for 2–6-year-olds, has closed
LEGOCOPTER	Flash Dance	?-2007	Miniland		replaced by RC Monter Trucks
RC Monter Truck	RC Car Track	2008	Miniland		replaced by Frog Hopper
Jungle Rally	Driving simulator	2002-2009	Adventureland		Small cars for kids between 95 and 130 cm tall who can drive it by themselves. replaced by The Temple
Mine Train	Dark ride	1978–19 Aug 2013	LEGOREDO Town		a train ride journey through a dark mine where miners are hard at work. Replaced by Ghost-The Haunted House
Timber Ride	Steel roller coaster	1978–19 Aug 2013	LEGOREDO Town		replaced by Ghost-The Haunted House
Pirate Mini Water Falls	Play area	2008–2019	Pirate Land		water play area for very young children
Pirate Water Falls	Play area	2008–2019	Pirate Land		water play area for children
Chief Longears	Meet & greet	1985–2021	LEGOREDO Town		meet and greet the Indian Chief
The Lighthouse	Interactive Tower	1999–2023	Pirate Land		the rider manually pulls themself up and down the tower
Vikings' River Splash	River rapids	2006–Oct 2024	Knight's Kingdom		a 438-meter-long (1,437 ft) river rapids ride that features a Viking theme and has an 8 m (26 ft) drop at the end

== Accident ==
On 29 April 2007, a 21-year-old female employee was killed by a roller coaster when she climbed over a security fence to retrieve a guest's wallet.

== Gallery ==
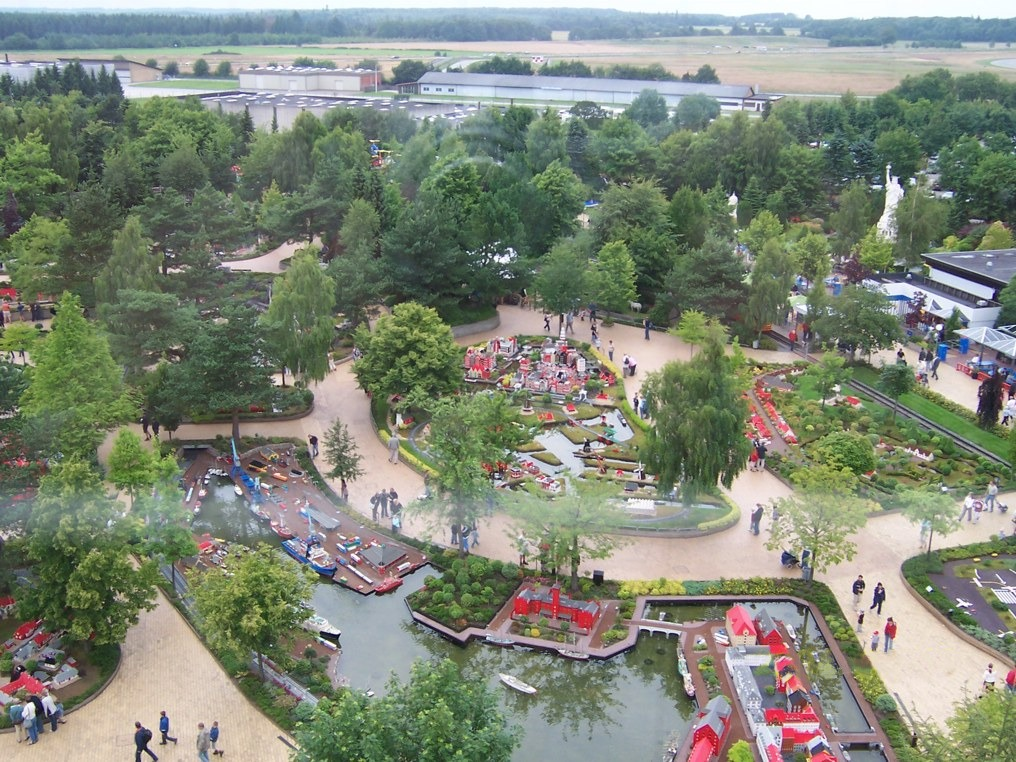
View from the observation tower (click to enlarge)

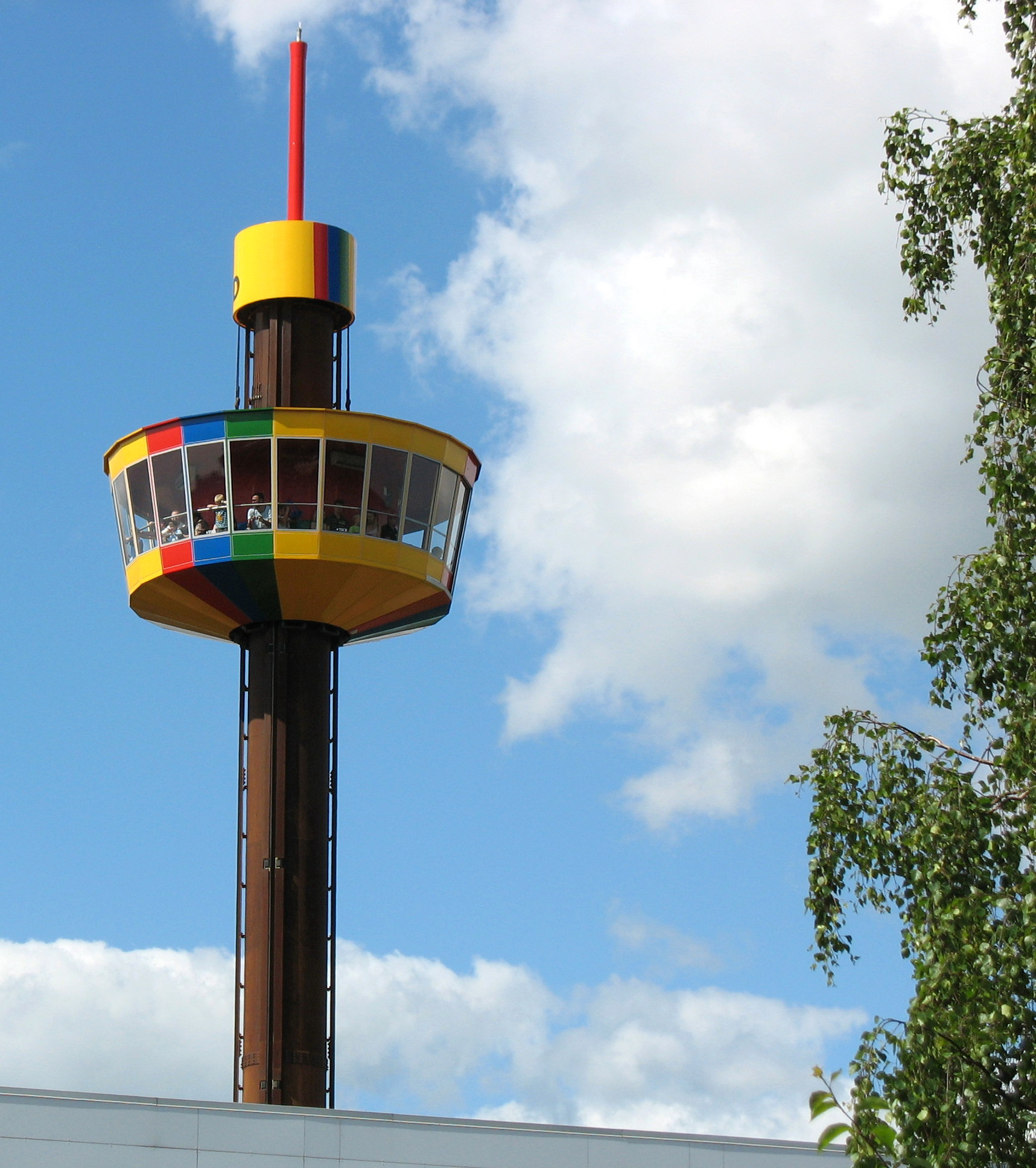
Observation tower

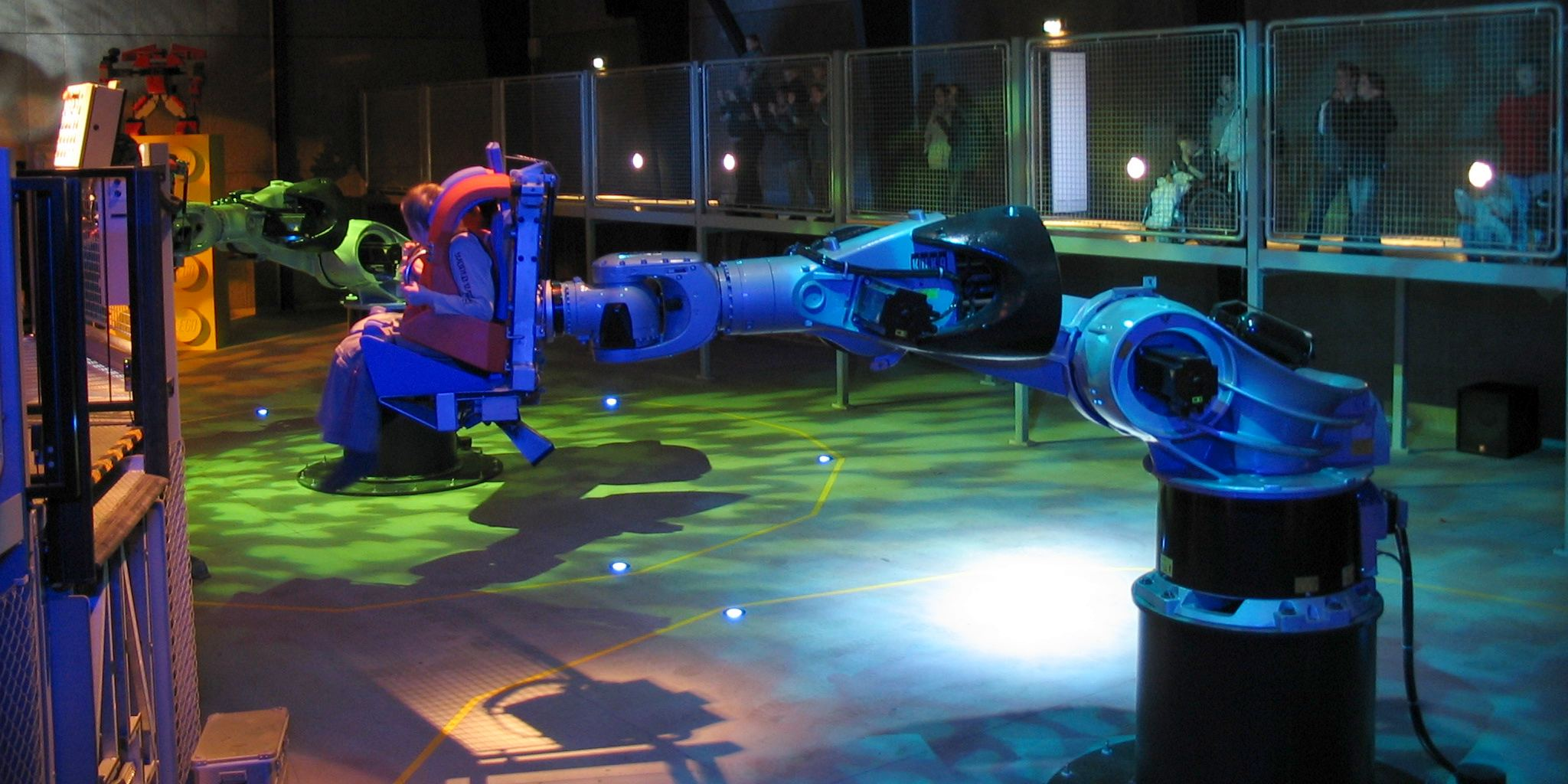
KUKA Robocoaster programmable robotic arm

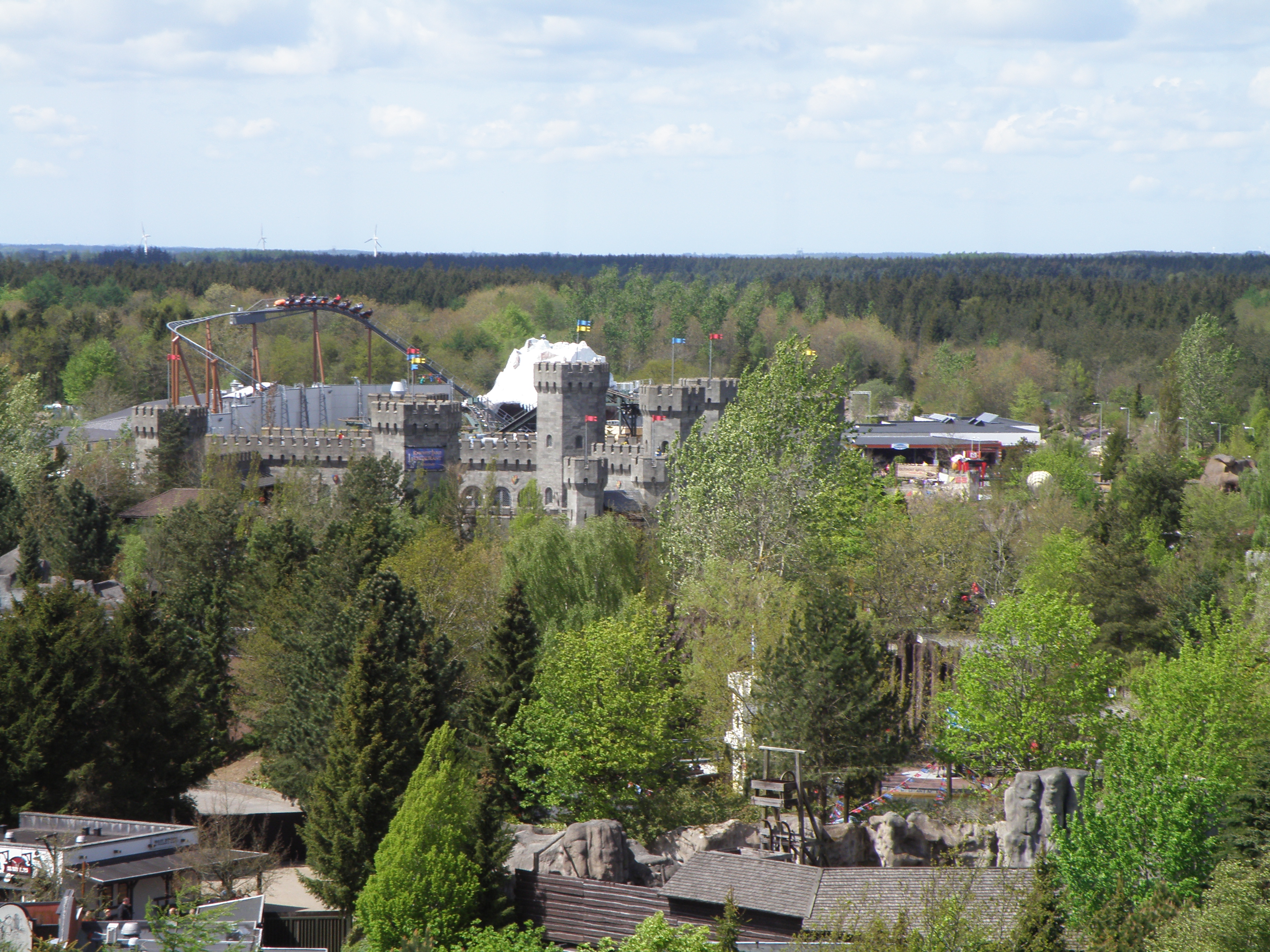
View from the Lego Top (tower), May 2012

== See also ==
- Incidents at European amusement parks
