= Granny's Apple Fries =

Dessert served in Legoland parks

Granny's Apple Fries are a popular dessert served in Legoland parks including those in California, Florida, and New York. They are Granny Smith apples deep fried and coated in cinnamon sugar. They were first made available at Legoland California in 1999 before being added to other locations.
