= The Dragon (roller coaster) =

Chain of roller coaster dark rides at Legoland parks

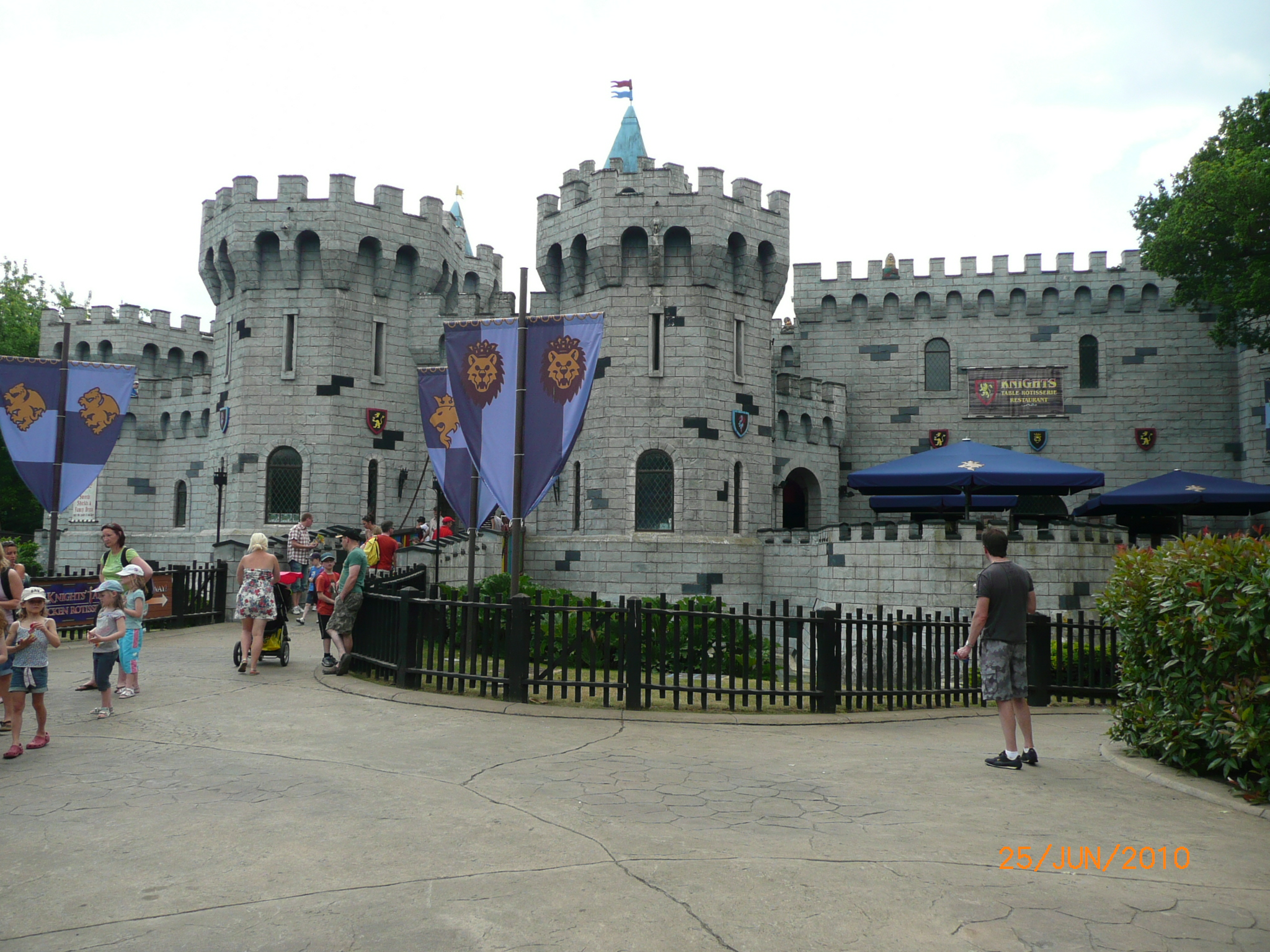
- The Dragon at Legoland Windsor

Legoland parks worldwide
- Location: Legoland parks worldwide
- Park section: Knight's Kingdom
- Status: Operating
- Opening date: 1997

General statistics
- Type: Steel – Family
- Manufacturer: Various
- Model: Motorized / Junior Coaster / Force Five (various)
- Lift/launch system: Drive tire
- Inversions: 0
- Restraint style: Lap bar
- Trains: 2 or 3 trains with 10 cars. Riders are arranged 2 across in a single row for a total of 20 riders per train.

The Dragon is a series of roller coaster attractions located at multiple Legoland theme parks worldwide, including Legoland Billund, Legoland Windsor, Legoland California, Legoland Deutschland, Legoland Florida, Legoland Malaysia, Legoland Dubai, Legoland Japan, Legoland New York, and Legoland Korea.

The attraction combines a dark ride section with a steel roller coaster layout. Riders travel through an indoor medieval castle environment featuring animated scenes before transitioning into an outdoor coaster ride. The station buildings are typically designed as large grey castles and serve as visual landmarks within the parks.

== History and installations ==
=== Legoland Billund ===
The original installation, known as Dragen, opened in 1997 at Legoland Billund in the Knight's Kingdom area. Built by Mack Rides, the attraction begins with an approximately one-minute dark ride section before entering the coaster portion.

=== Legoland Windsor ===
Opened in 1998 at Legoland Windsor, this version was the park's first roller coaster and was built by WGH Transportation. The ride begins inside a medieval castle with a dark ride section before exiting outdoors into the coaster layout.

The attraction includes minimum height requirements, typically requiring riders to be at least 1 metre (3.3 ft) tall with an accompanying adult, or taller to ride alone.

=== Legoland California ===
The attraction at Legoland California opened in 1999 and was manufactured by Vekoma. It is a modified junior roller coaster model featuring the same combination of dark ride and coaster elements.

=== Legoland Deutschland ===
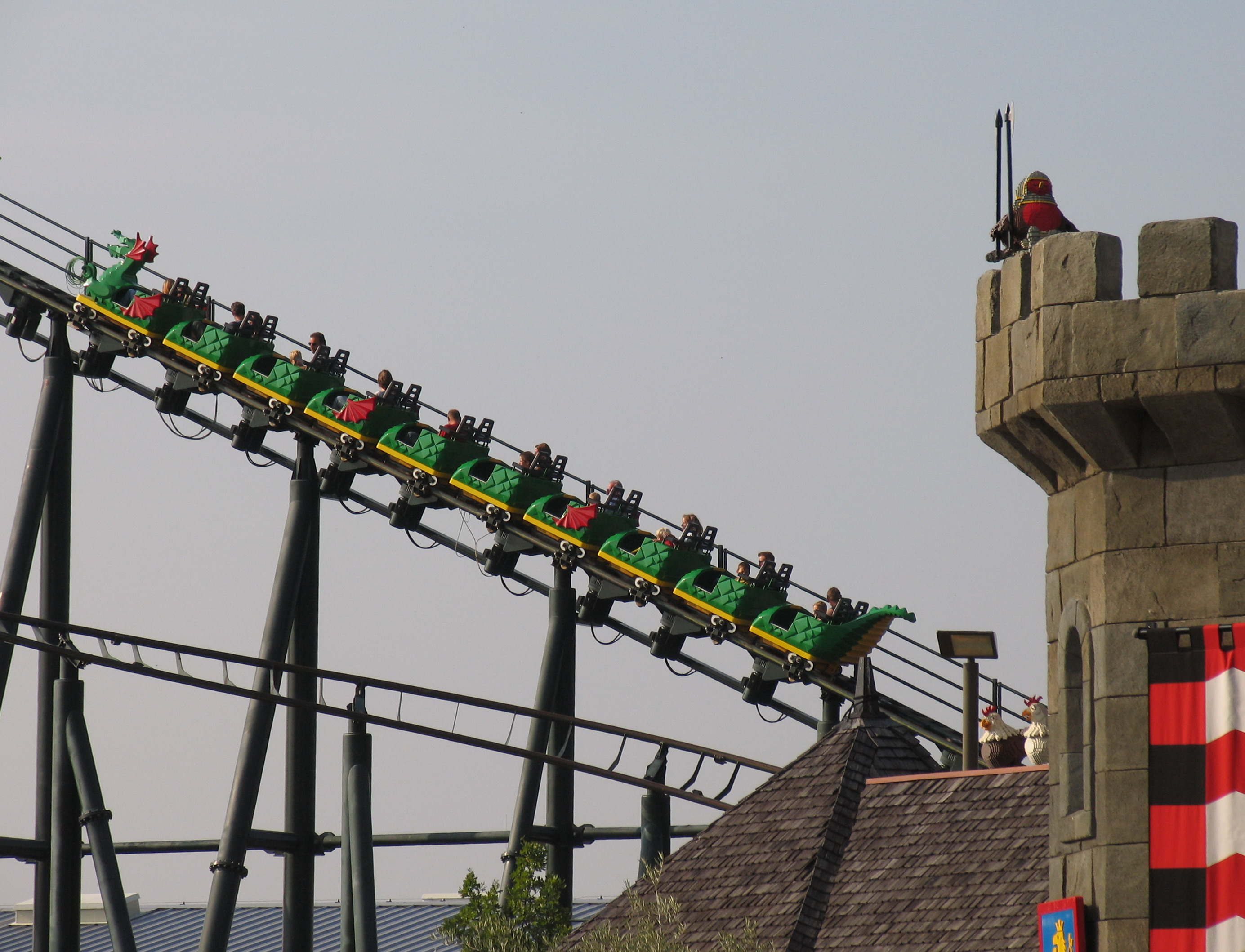
The rollercoaster, named "Feuerdrache" in Legoland Deutschland

At Legoland Deutschland, the ride is called Feuerdrache (Fire Dragon) and opened in 2002. Manufactured by Zierer, it is based on the Force Five model and features a height of 16 metres (52 ft) and a top speed of 60 kilometres per hour (37 mph).

In August 2022, an accident occurred on the Fire Dragon roller coaster when two trains collided after one failed to stop in time. More than 30 people were injured, though most injuries were minor. The incident prompted an investigation and temporary closure of the ride.

=== Legoland Florida ===
The Florida installation opened in 2004 as Okeechobee Rampage at Cypress Gardens Adventure Park. Built by Vekoma, it later reopened in 2011 as The Dragon at Legoland Florida. The ride retains the signature combination of indoor dark ride and outdoor coaster.

=== Legoland Malaysia ===
Opened on 15 September 2012, the Malaysian version was built by Zierer and follows the Force Five model.

=== Legoland Dubai ===
The Dubai installation opened with the park in 2016. It was also manufactured by Zierer and follows the Force Five design.

=== Legoland Japan ===
The attraction opened on 1 April 2017 at Legoland Japan, continuing the standard format of a dark ride followed by a coaster.

=== Legoland New York ===
The version at Legoland New York opened on 9 July 2021 and was built by Zierer.

=== Legoland Korea ===
The most recent installation opened on 5 May 2022 at Legoland Korea, also manufactured by Zierer.

== Ride experience ==
All versions of The Dragon share a similar concept. The ride begins as a slow-moving dark ride through a medieval castle populated with scenes featuring knights, wizards, and dragons, often using animatronics. The trains then exit the building, ascend a lift hill, and complete a family-friendly coaster circuit with gentle turns and drops. The rides do not feature inversions and are designed to be accessible to younger guests.

The themed storytelling element, combining dark ride scenes with a coaster finale, has been cited as one of the defining characteristics of Legoland's approach to family attractions.
