= Knightmare (roller coaster) =

Defunct roller coaster in the UK

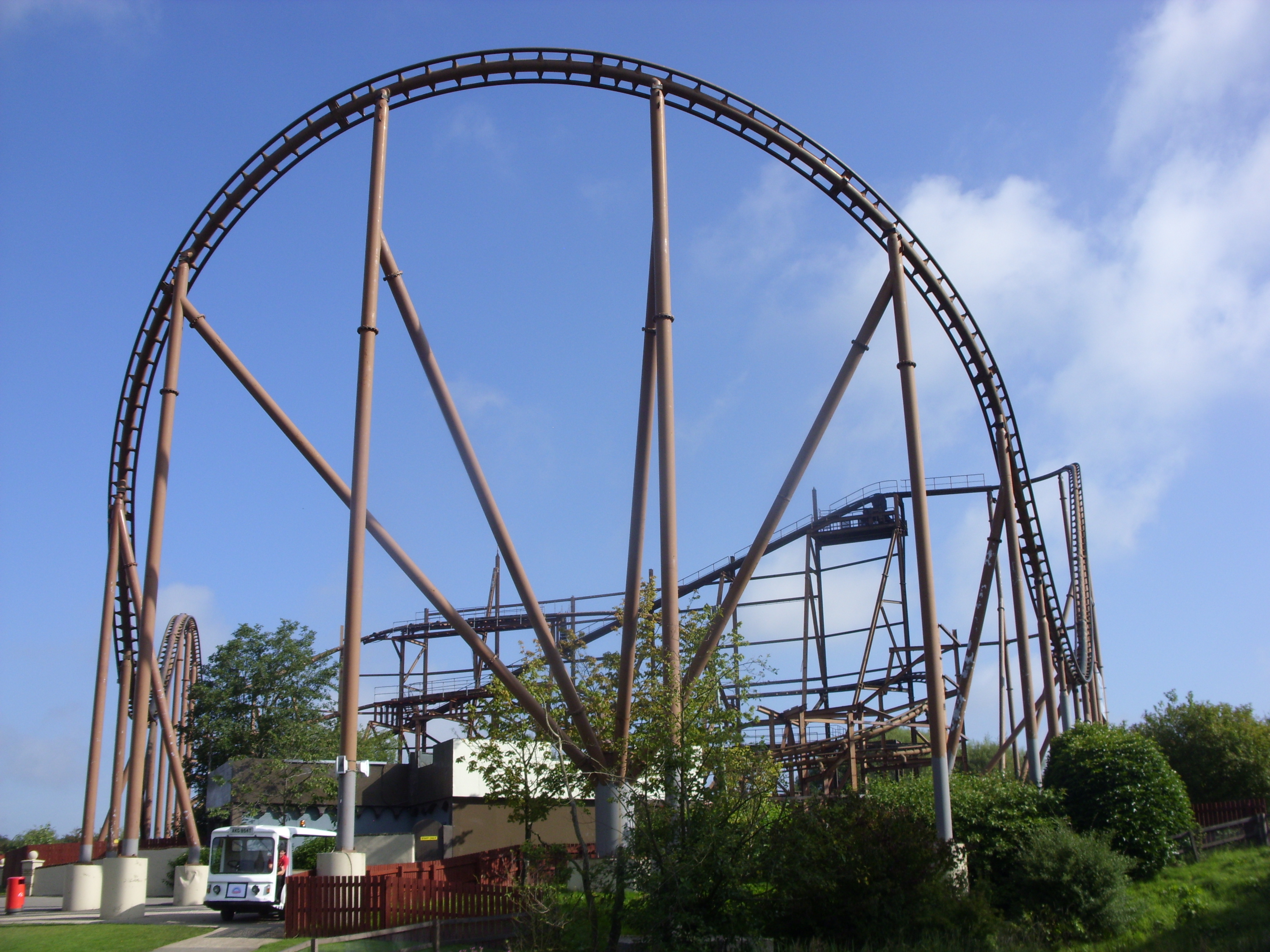
- Knightmare in August 2010

Camelot Theme Park
- Coordinates: 53°38′10″N 2°42′02″W
- Status: Removed
- Opening date: July 2007
- Closing date: 2 September 2012
- Cost: £3,000,000

Portopialand
- Name: Bavarian Mountain Railroad
- Coordinates: 34.665°N 135.213°E
- Status: Removed
- Opening date: March 1987
- Closing date: 2006
- Bavarian Mountain Railroad at Portopialand at RCDB

General statistics
- Manufacturer: Zierer
- Designer: Anton Schwarzkopf
- Height: 86.9 ft (26.5 m)
- Length: 2,601.7 ft (793.0 m)
- Speed: 43.5 mph (70.0 km/h)
- Inversions: 0
- Duration: 1:56
- Capacity: 1,500 riders per hour
- G-force: 5
- Height restriction: 130 cm (4 ft 3 in)
- Trains: 5 trains with 7 cars; riders arranged 2 across in a single row for a total of 14 riders per train
- Knightmare at RCDB

Knightmare was a custom roller coaster at the now defunct Camelot Theme Park in Chorley, Lancashire, United Kingdom. It was built by Zierer and designed by Anton Schwarzkopf.

== History ==
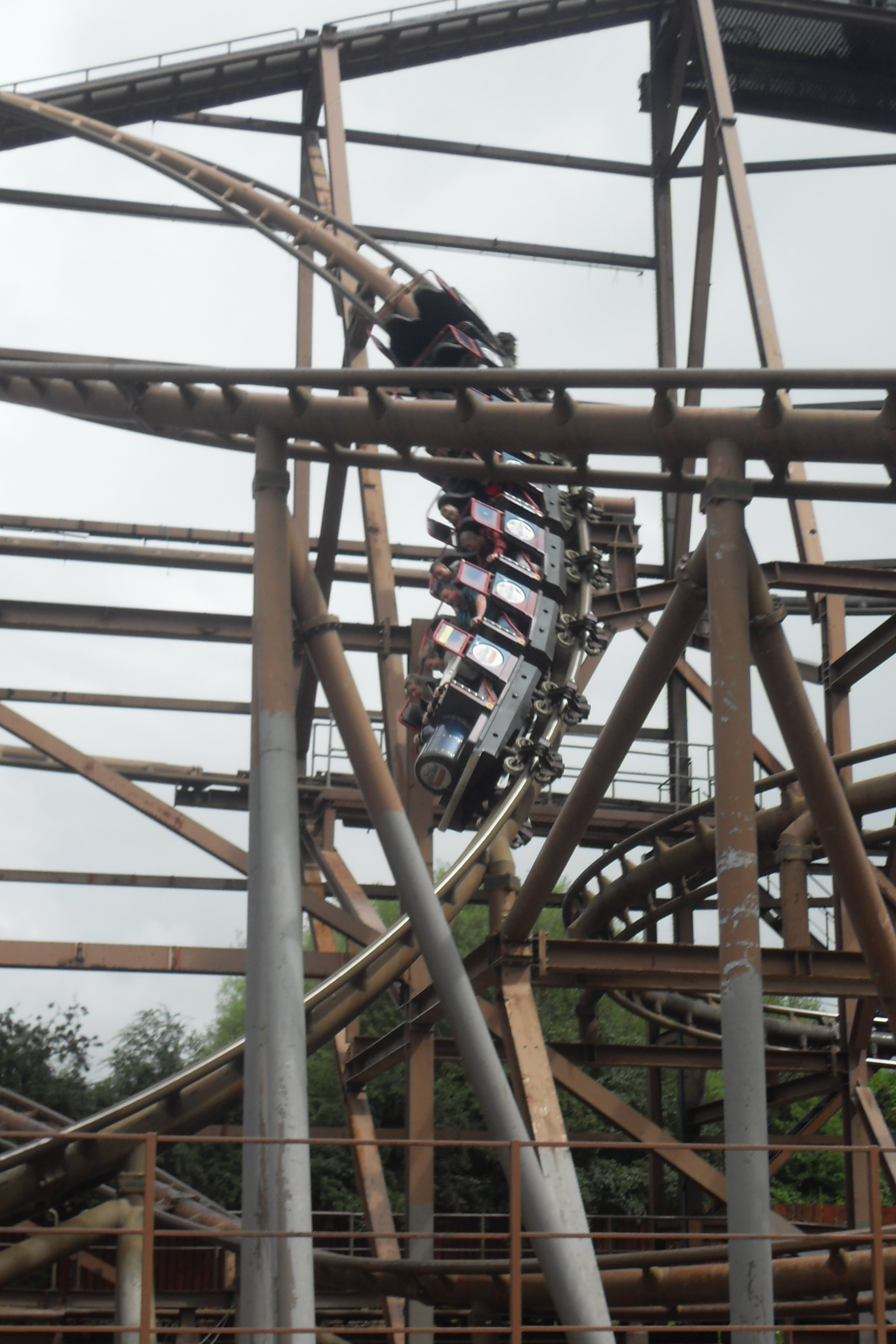
A train on the ride (2010)

It was originally built in 1987 for a theme park in Kobe, Japan called Portopialand (now defunct) under the name BMRX/Bavarian Mountain Railroad, and was a dark indoor ride with a huge mountain themed structure surrounding it. After Portopialand closed in March 2006, the roller coaster was acquired by Camelot Theme Park and was dismantled and shipped to the United Kingdom. It cost the park £3 million to build the roller coaster.

The track and trains arrived at Camelot at the end of 2006, without the mountain structure that initially enclosed it. At the beginning of 2007, the reconstruction began, with the ride finally opening to the public in the summer of 2007, as Knightmare. The coaster originally featured five different coloured trains. When relaunched at Camelot, the park refurbished three of the five trains.

Some of the steam train theming was removed (such as the funnel and headlights) from the front of the trains. The three trains were painted differently with one being partly maroon, one partly purple and the other partly green. The other two trains were placed in storage at the park. Each train had a capacity of 14 people, and the ride had a minimum height restriction of 1.3 metres (4 ft 3 in).

The ride took the train up a semi spiral chain lift to its tallest point at 87 feet (27 m), then dropped the train into an overbanked turn. The ride then took passengers through various sharp turns, multiple helixes and a near-vertical bend (nicknamed "the psycho drop") halfway through where they experienced almost 5 g, reaching speeds of about 40 miles per hour (64 km/h).

The ride was over 0.5 miles (0.80 km) long, and lasted just under two minutes. Knightmare was arguably one of the most intense roller coasters in the United Kingdom, and at the time of opening had the highest g-force of any roller coaster in the United Kingdom.

It was located in the Land of the Brave area of the park, situated on the former sites of Camelot's long defunct flagship roller coasters (The Tower of Terror and The Gauntlet); it was also next to the site of the ride Excalibur 2. Knightmare was one of only three of its kind in the world, the others being Jetline at Gröna Lund (clone) and Lisebergbanan at Liseberg (custom layout).

After having trouble with low visitor numbers, The Story Group and Knights Leisure Limited announced that they were permanently closing Camelot Theme Park in November 2012, after 29 years. The roller coaster remained SBNO (standing but not operating) within the abandoned park from 2012 until 2020.

In recent years, there were incidents regarding safety concerns of urban explorers climbing 80 ft to the top of the roller coaster's lift hill.

In February 2020, Knightmare was dismantled by a demolition company after being left SBNO for nearly eight years.

== Rumours ==
In March 2015, internet rumours circulated throughout roller coaster forums that Southport Pleasureland were targeting the Knightmare roller coaster as a new addition to the park, though Pleasureland owner Norman Wallis was very vague in addressing these rumours.

In May 2017, the Blackpool Gazette reported the first public sighting of a Knightmare roller coaster train since Camelot's closure, in which the train slipped off the back of a lorry transporting it and fell onto the middle of a road in Thornton, there were no injuries in the incident. The condition of the train itself is still unknown.

In August 2017, Southport Pleasureland denied all rumours of their involvement with Knightmare, despite photographic evidence of the Knightmare trains being seen in park storage, stating in their response to a theme park news website in the United Kingdom, Ride Rater, that "we don't have it".
