= Kikkerachtbaan =

Roller coaster

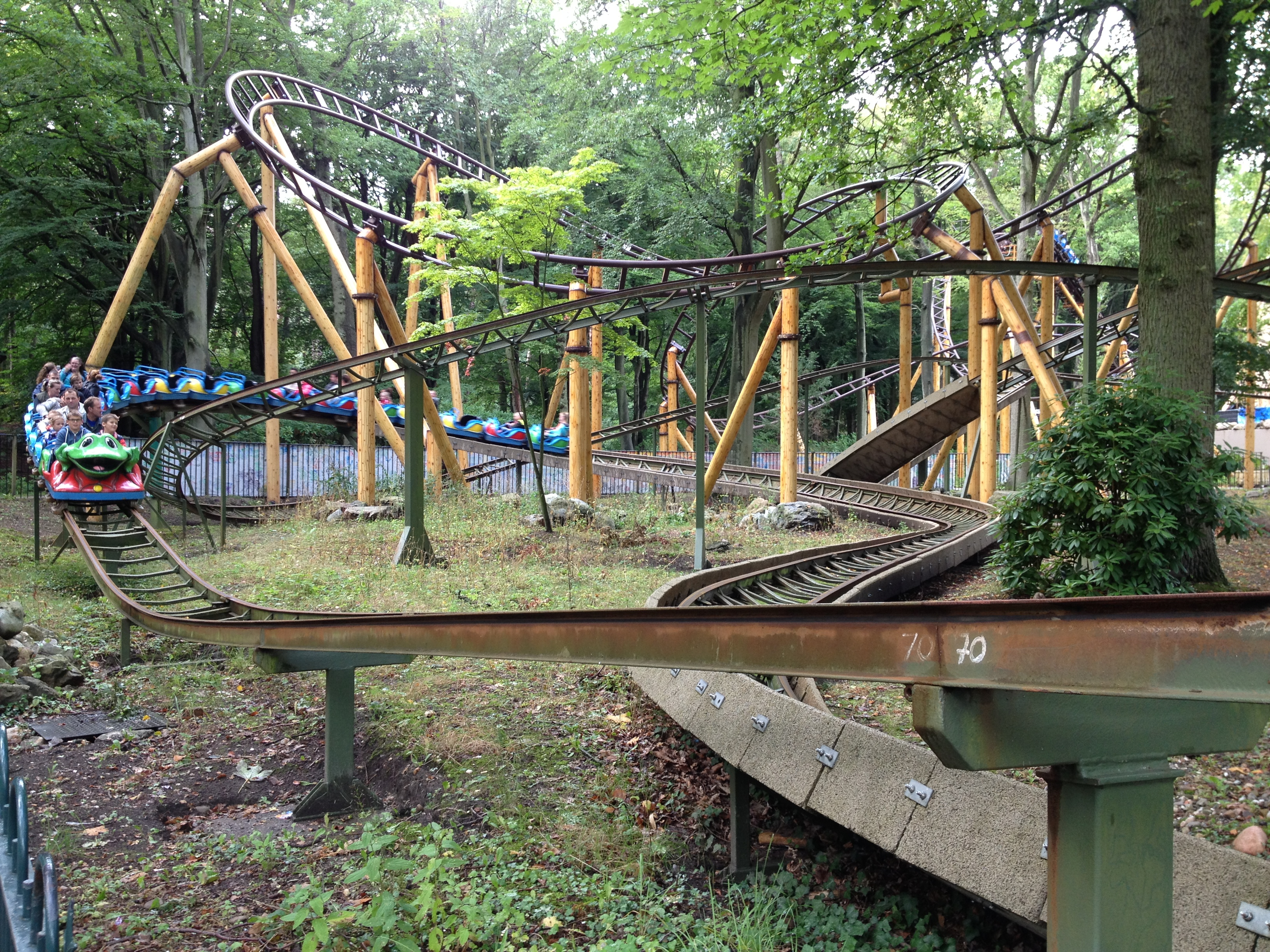
- Kikkerachtbaan

Duinrell
- Location: Duinrell
- Coordinates: 52.146587°N 4.379041°E
- Status: Closed
- Opening date: 1985
- Closing date: 10 November 2025

General statistics
- Type: Steel
- Manufacturer: Zierer
- Height: 8 m (26 ft)
- Length: 360 m (1,180 ft)
- Speed: 36 km/h (22 mph)
- Inversions: 0
- Duration: 1:10 m
- Max vertical angle: 97°
- Capacity: 1250 riders per hour
- Height restriction: 120 cm (3 ft 11 in)
- Kikkerachtbaan at RCDB

Kikkerachtbaan (Frog Roller Coaster) is a steel roller coaster in the Dutch amusement park Duinrell, which was opened in 1985, it was one of the first attractions in Duinrell.

== Information ==
It was built by the German manufacturer Zierer which is located in Deggendorf. The capacity of the roller coaster amounts to about 1250 persons per hour. Children are allowed from a height of 1,20 meter unaccompanied in the attraction. Smaller children only if an adult (parent) accompanies them.

The train of this roller coaster consists of 20 vehicles, each car has two seating areas per person, which amounts to a maximum of 40 people per trip. It has one train. On the top of the front carriage of the train, mascot Rick the Frog depicted with his hands folded where his chin rests.

This Frog Roller Coaster has been decommissioned on 10 November 2025 after last ride. It will be replaced by new next generation Frog Roller Coaster and will reopened at Easter 2026.
