= Zierer =

German maker of roller coasters and other amusements

- Industry: Manufacturing
- Founded: 1930
- Headquarters: Deggendorf, Germany
- Products: Amusement rides, roller coasters
- Number of employees: 50 (approx.)
- Parent: Max Streicher GmbH & Co. KG aA
- Website: www.zierer.com

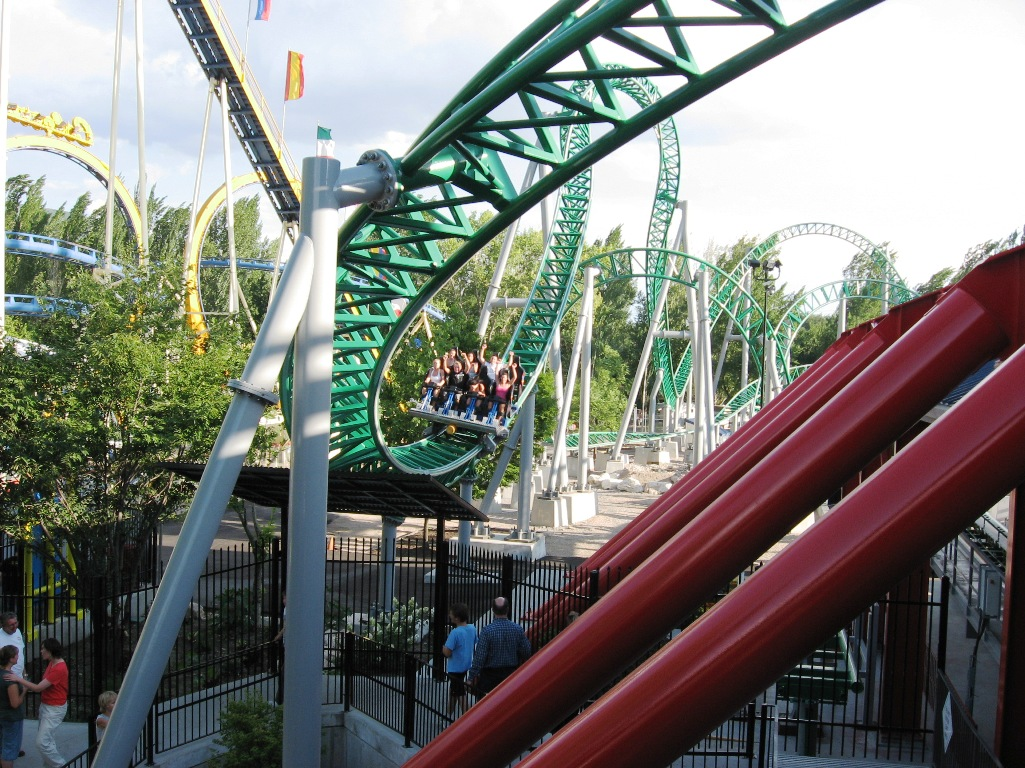
Wicked at Lagoon, manufactured by Zierer

Zierer Karussell- und Spezialmaschinenbau GmbH & Co. KG (Short name: Zierer [ˈt͡siːʁɐ]) is a German company located close to Deggendorf. Zierer manufactures ESC and Force line of roller coasters, as well as panoramic wheels, wave swingers, flying carpets, Hexentanz, and Kontiki rides. They have previously manufactured the Tivoli line of coasters, however these have now been discontinued. The company also has partnered with Schwarzkopf to build Lisebergbanan at Liseberg and Knightmare at Camelot Theme Park.

The name of the company, translated from German, is Zierer Carousel and Special Machine Construction. "Special machine construction" refers to amusement rides such as roller coasters or wave swingers.

Zierer was founded in 1930, and is a subsidiary of Max Streicher GmbH & Co. KG aA.

== List of roller coasters ==
As of 2023, Zierer has built 193 roller coasters around the world.

Name	Model	Park	Country	Opened	Status	Ref
Flitzer	Flitzer	Meli Park Heysel	Belgium	Unknown	Removed	
Kiddie Coaster	Tivoli Small	Hanshin Park	Japan	Unknown	Removed	
Marienkäferbahn	Tivoli Large	Freizeitpark Kirchhorst	Germany	Unknown	Removed	
La Course	Flitzer	La Ronde	Canada	1972	Removed	
Flitzer	Flitzer	Crystal Beach Park	Canada	1974	Removed	
Flitzer	Flitzer	Frontier City	United States	1974	Removed	
Mariehønen	Tivoli Small	Tivoli Gardens	Denmark	1974	Removed	
#LikeMe Coaster; Formerly Viktor's Race; Dongo's Race; Formerly Marienkaferbahn	Tivoli Large	Plopsaland	Belgium	1976	Operating	
Nyckelpigan	Tivoli Small	Gröna Lund	Sweden	1976	Operating	
Timber Ride	Tivoli Small	Legoland Billund	Denmark	1978	Removed	
Vierer-Bob	Four Man Bob	Wiener Prater	Austria	1978	Removed	
Lady Bug Coaster; Formerly Tivoli Coaster	Tivoli Small	Marineland Theme Park	Canada	1979	SBNO	
Wilde Biene; Formerly Marienkäferbahn	Tivoli Large	Zoo Safaripark Stukenbrock	Germany	1979	Operating	
Achtbaan	Tivoli Medium	Amusementspark Tivoli	Netherlands	1980	Operating	
Flitzer	Flitzer	Playland Park	United States	1980	Removed	
Racing	Flitzer	Bakken	Denmark	1980	Removed	
Racing; Formerly Vierer-Bob	Flitzer	Meli Park	Belgium	1980	Removed	
Green Snake; Formerly Achtbaan	Tivoli Large	De Valkenier	Netherlands	1981	Removed	
Hoot N Holler; Formerly Brain Teaser; Formerly Nessie the Dreamy Dragon; Formerly Ladybug	Tivoli Small	Six Flags Darien Lake	United States	1981	Operating	
Keverbaan	Tivoli Large	Bellewaerde	Belgium	1981	Removed	
Mariehønen	Tivoli Small	Bakken	Denmark	1981	Operating	
Tsunami; Formerly Catarina Voladora	Tivoli Large	Six Flags Mexico	Mexico	1981	Operating	
Flitzer	Flitzer	Jolly Roger at the Pier	United States	1982	Removed	
Chura Racer; Formerly Froschflitzer; Formerly Marienkäferbahn	Tivoli Large	Serengeti Park	Germany	1983	Removed	
Children Coaster	Tivoli Medium	Nagashima Spa Land	Japan	1983	Operating	
Flitzer	Flitzer	Morey's Piers	United States	1983	Removed	
Marienkäfer Hochbahn	Tivoli Small	Churpfalzpark	Germany	1983	Operating	
Vierer-Bob	Four Man Bob	Movie Park Germany	Germany	1983	Removed	
Flitzer	Flitzer	Barry Island Pleasure Park	United Kingdom	1984	Removed	
Serpent Hopi	Tivoli Large	OK Corral	France	1984	Operating	
Vauhtimato	Tivoli Small	Särkänniemi Amusement Park	Finland	1984	Operating	
Cootie Coaster; Formerly Autosled	Tivoli Custom	Galaxyland	Canada	1985	Operating	
Kikkerachtbaan; Formerly Kikker-8-Baan	Tivoli Large	Duinrell	Netherlands	1985	Removed	
Puff the Little Fire Dragon	Tivoli Small	Lagoon	United States	1985	Operating	
Alap Alap	Tivoli Medium	Dunia Fantasi	Indonesia	1986	Operating	
Egg-Spress; Formerly Rattlesnake; Formerly Snake In The Grass; Formerly Ladybird	Tivoli Large	Pleasurewood Hills	United Kingdom	1986	Operating	
Ladybird	Tivoli Large	Dreamland	United Kingdom	1986	Removed	
Marienkäferbahn	Tivoli Large	Fort Fun Abenteuerland; Löwensafari und Freizeit-Park Tüddern	Germany	1986; Unknown	Operating	
Rasender Tausendfüßler	Tivoli Large	Erlebnispark Tripsdrill	Germany	1986	Operating	
Familienachterbahn	Tivoli Medium	Schloß Beck Freizeitpark	Germany	1987	Operating	
Lisebergbanan	Unknown	Liseberg	Sweden	1987	Operating	
Unknown	Tivoli Unknown	Wonderful World of Whimsy	China; Hong Kong	1987	Removed	
Jetline; Formerly Berg- och Dalbanan	Unknown	Gröna Lund	Sweden	1988	Removed	
Live Oak Ladybug	Tivoli Medium	Carousel Gardens Amusement Park	United States	1988	Removed	
Rudy's Rapid Transit; Formerly Firefly Roller Coaster	Tivoli Large	Santa's Village; New England Playworld	United States	1988	Removed	
Tivoli Plunge	Shoot the Chute	Tivoli Pier	United States	1988	Removed	
Tivoli Coaster	Tivoli Medium	Toy Kingdom	Japan	1988	Removed	
Marienkäferbahn	Tivoli Large	Freizeit-Land Geiselwind; Movie Park Germany	Germany	1989; 1979 to 1985	Removed	
SOS Tournevis; Formerly SOS Numérobis; Formerly Périférix; Formerly Trans'Arverne	Tivoli Medium	Parc Astérix	France	1990	Operating	
Flitzer	Flitzer	York's Wild Kingdom	United States	1991	Removed	
Coccinelle	Tivoli Large	Walibi Sud-Ouest	France	1992	Operating	
Coccinelle; Formerly Coccinelle des Andes	Tivoli Large	Walibi Rhône-Alpes	France	1992	Operating	
Drako; Formerly Rattlesnake; Formerly Wok's Waanzin; Formerly Road Runner Express; Formerly Keverbaan; Formerly Tarzungle	Tivoli Medium	Walibi Holland; Zygo Park	Netherlands	1992; 1987 to 1991	Operating	
Eichhörnchenbahn	Force One	Freizeitpark Lochmühle	Germany	1992	Operating	
Familienachterbahn	Force One	Erse Park Uetze	Germany	1992	Operating	
Pepsi Orange Streak; Formerly Pepsi Ripsaw	Tivoli Custom	Nickelodeon Universe inside the Mall of America	United States	1992	Operating	
Hundeprutterutchebane	Force One	BonBon-Land	Denmark	1993	Operating	
Ladybird	Tivoli Medium	Lightwater Valley	United Kingdom	1993	Operating	
Potts Blitz	Force Two	Potts Park	Germany	1993	Operating	
Flitzer	Flitzer	Playland's Castaway Cove	United States	1994	Removed	
Piraten Spinner; Formerly Drehgondelbahn	Spinning Coaster	Freizeit-Land Geiselwind	Germany	1994	Operating	
Vol D'Icare	Hornet	Parc Astérix	France	1994	Operating	
Froschbahn	Tivoli Small	Bayern Park	Germany	1995	Operating	
Hornet	Hornet	Flambards Village Theme Park	United Kingdom	1995	Removed	
Huracan	Tivoli Custom	Perimágico	Mexico	1995	Operating	
Jaguar!	Tivoli Custom	Knott's Berry Farm	United States	1995	Operating	
Roller Coaster; Formerly Zoom	Tivoli Custom	Yoyo Land	Japan	1995	Operating	
Super Dragon	Force Custom	Navel Land	Japan	1995	Removed	
Holzwurmachterbahn	Tivoli Medium	Jaderpark	Germany	1996	Operating	
Marienkäferbahn	Tivoli Custom	Traumland auf der Bärenhöhle	Germany	1996	Removed	
Ghoster Coaster	Tivoli Custom	Puriland	Indonesia	1997	Removed	
Kaninus; Formerly ZimzalaBon	Tivoli Small	BonBon-Land	Denmark	1997	In storage	
Dinolino's VR-Ride; Formerly Familienachterbahn	Force Two	Erlebnispark Schloss Thurn	Germany	1998	Operating	
Drachen-Achterbahn	Force Two	Tier- und Freizeitpark Thüle	Germany	1998	Operating	
Vigía	Tivoli Large	Parque de la Costa	Argentina	1998	Operating	
Tentomushi	Tivoli Medium	Tobi Zoo Park	Japan	1998	Operating	
Green Scream	Tivoli New	Adventure Island	United Kingdom	1999	Operating	
Harley Quinn Crazy Train; Formerly Blackbeard's Lost Treasure Train	Tivoli Large	Six Flags Great Adventure	United States	1999	Operating	
Ladybird	Tivoli Small	Wicksteed Park	United Kingdom	1999	Operating	
Barnstormer	Tivoli Custom	Adventure Island	United Kingdom	2000	Operating	
Cat-O-Pillar Coaster; Formerly Stinger	Tivoli Medium	Paultons Park	United Kingdom	2000	Operating	
Catwoman's Whip; Formerly Poison Ivy's Tangled Train	Tivoli Large	Six Flags New England	United States	2000	Operating	
Cobra	Tivoli Large	Six Flags Discovery Kingdom	United States	2000	Operating	
Familien-Achterbahn	Force One	Tolk Schau	Germany	2000	Operating	
Linnunrata eXtra; Formerly Linnunrata; Formerly Space Express	Force Custom	Linnanmäki	Finland	2000	Operating	
Orca Ride	Tivoli New	Boudewijn Seapark	Belgium	2000	Operating	
Rattlesnake Coaster; Formerly Ladybug Rollercoaster; Formerly Ladybug Coaster; Formerly Paul Bunyan Express; Formerly Family Coaster	Tivoli Medium	Adventureland; Navel Land	United States	2000; 1995 to 1998	Operating	
Silver Mine; Formerly Achterbahn; Formerly Mäuseachterbahn; Formerly Rioolrat; Formerly Der Flitzer	Flitzer	Freizeitpark Plohn; Spielerei Rheda-Wiedenbrück; Avonturenpark Hellendoorn; Adventureland	Germany	2000; 1996 to 1999; 1991 to 1995; 1974 to 1990	Removed	
Achterbahn	Tivoli New	Bayern Park	Germany	2001	Operating	
Catarina; Formerly Keverbaan	Tivoli Large	Selva Mágica; Attractiepark Slagharen	Mexico	2001	Removed	
Timber Twister	Tivoli Medium	Gilroy Gardens	United States	2001	Operating	
Big Apple	Tivoli Large	Allou Fun Park	Greece	2002	Removed	
Choconoy	Tivoli Large	Xetulul	Guatemala	2002	Operating	
Feuerdrache	Force Five	Legoland Deutschland	Germany	2002	Operating	
Roller Coaster	Tivoli Custom	Fantasy Kingdom	Bangladesh	2002	Operating	
Tom y Jerry; Formerly Boardwalk Canyon Blaster	Tivoli Large	Parque Warner Madrid; Six Flags Fiesta Texas	Spain	2002; Unknown	Operating	
Unknown	Tivoli Medium	Formosa Fun Coast	Taiwan	2002	Removed	
Achterbahn; Formerly Eiserne Schlange; Formerly Familienachterbahn; Formerly Colorado Express; Formerly Seeschlange	Tivoli Large	Magic Park Verden; Varde Sommerland; Hansa Park	Germany	2003; Unknown; 1977 to 1992	Operating	
Dino Chase; Formerly Flying Frog	Tivoli Small (Variant)	Paultons Park	United Kingdom	2003	Operating	
Flitzer	Flitzer	Wonder Island; Future World	Russia	2003; Unknown	Removed	
Raupen Express; Formerly Crazy Worm	Force Zero	Schwaben Park	Germany	2003	Operating	
Family Coaster	Tivoli Medium	Guilin Merryland Theme Park	China	2004	Operating	
Jozi Express	Force Custom	Gold Reef City	South Africa	2004	Operating	
Speedway Coaster; Formerly Speedway Draft; Formerly Daytona Draft	Force One	NASCAR SpeedPark	United States	2004	Operating	
Super Grover's Box Car Derby; Formerly Shamu Express	Force Zero	SeaWorld San Antonio	United States	2004	Operating	
Donderstenen	Force Two	Avonturenpark Hellendoorn	Netherlands	2005	Operating	
Orca	Force Zero	Loro Parque	Spain	2005	Operating	
Wickie Coaster; Formerly Piratenbaan	Force Two	Plopsa Indoor Hasselt	Belgium	2005	Operating	
Zeeslang; Formerly Achtbaan; Formerly Avonturenslang	Tivoli Medium	DippieDoe Familiepark; Avonturenpark Hellendoorn	Netherlands	2005; 1978 to 2004	Removed	
Catariños	Tivoli Small	Parque Plaza Sesamo	Mexico	2006	Removed	
Super Grover's Box Car Derby; Formerly Shamu Express	Force Three	SeaWorld Orlando	United States	2006	Operating	
Unknown	Tivoli Small	Parque Mariscal Santa Cruz	Bolivia	2006	Operating	
Flying Dragon; Formerly Roller Coaster	Force One	Kuwait Entertainment City	Kuwait	2007	Removed	
Knightmare; Formerly BMRX; Formerly Bavarian Mountain Railroad	Unknown	Camelot Theme Park; Kobe Portopialand	United Kingdom	2007; 1987 to 2006	Removed	
Racing	Flitzer	Jolly Roger Amusement Park	United States	2007	Removed	
Wicked	Tower Launch Coaster	Lagoon	United States	2007	Operating	
Buzz Coaster	Tivoli Small	Funland	Indonesia	2008	Operating	
Indy-Blitz; Formerly Indianer-Achterbahn	Force One	Heide Park	Germany	2008	Operating	
Achtbaan; Formerly Wilde Tijger Achtbaan; Formerly Cirkusexpressen; Formerly Lilla Bergbanan	Tivoli Medium	Mondo Verde; Liseberg	Netherlands	2009; 1977 to 2008	Operating	
Grover's Alpine Express	Force 190	Busch Gardens Williamsburg	United States	2009	Operating	
Hemmelige Verden; Formerly Viktor Vandorm; Formerly Flinker Fridolin	Tivoli Custom	BonBon-Land; Panorama Park	Denmark	2009	Operating	
Magic Thunder Coaster	Force Two	Trans Studio	Indonesia	2009	Operating	
Rabalder	Force Two	Liseberg	Sweden	2009	Operating	
Roller Coaster; Formerly Beaver Land Mine Ride; Formerly Roadrunner Express	Tivoli Large	Papéa Parc; Geauga Lake	France	2009; 2000 to 2007	Operating	
Air Grover	Force 190	Busch Gardens Tampa	United States	2010	Operating	
Force One	ESC 535	Schwaben Park	Germany	2010	Operating	
Wickiebaan; Formerly Piratenbaan	Force Two	Plopsa Indoor Coevorden	Netherlands	2010	Operating	
Astro Storm; Formerly Space Invader 2 Formerly Space Invader	Four Man Bob	Brean Theme Park; Blackpool Pleasure Beach	United Kingdom	2011; 1984 to 2008	Operating	
Plohseidon	Force Custom	Freizeitpark Plohn	Germany	2011	Operating	
Roller Coaster	Force Two	Parc des Naudières	France	2011	Operating	
Tyfoon; Formerly Slangen; Formerly Kometen	Comet	DippieDoe Familiepark; Tivoil Gardens	Netherlands	2011; 1989 to 2003	Operating	
Dragon	Force Five	Legoland Malaysia	Malaysia	2012	Operating	
Dragon's Apprentice	Force 190	Legoland Malaysia	Malaysia	2012	Operating	
Polar X-plorer	Unknown	Legoland Billund	Denmark	2012	Operating	
Roller Coaster	ESC Custom	Gorky Park	Ukraine	2012	Operating	
Verbolten	ESC Custom	Busch Gardens Williamsburg	United States	2012	Operating	
Wild West Express; Formerly Endicott Emerald Mine; Formerly Runaway Mine Train	Tivoli Small	Glenwood Caverns Adventure Park; Wild Zone Adventures	United States	2012; Unknown	Operating	
Big Bang	ESC Custom	Freizietpark Familienland	Austria	2013	Operating	
Harvest Time	Force Two	Jungleland	Indonesia	2013	Operating	
Huracan	Force Custom	Bellewaerde	Belgium	2013	Operating	
Dream Coaster; Formerly Silver Streak	Tivoli Custom	Sky Ranch Pampanga; Story Land	Philippines	2014; Unknown	Operating	
Force One Coaster; Formerly Familien-Achterbahn	Force One	Kid City Tangerang inside the Transmart Cikolol; Eifelpark	Indonesia	2014; 1995 to 2012	Removed	
Il Tempo Extra Gigante	ESC 535	Hunderfossen Familiepark	Norway	2014	Operating	
Ronde des Rondins; Formerly Serpentin	Tivoli Small	Fraispertuis City; Parc Astérix	France	2014; 1989 to 2013	Operating	
Speed Track	Flitzer	Rand Show	South Africa	2014	Removed	
Godiståget	Force 190	Kolmården	Sweden	2015	Operating	
Impulse	Tower Speed Coaster	Knoebels Amusement Park & Resort	United States	2015	Operating	
Lady Bug	Force Two	Carousel Gardens Amusement Park	United States	2015	Operating	
Vilde Hønsejagt	Force Two	Djurs Sommerland	Denmark	2015	Operating	
Buccaneer Bay Bullet; Formerly Bullet	Tivoli Custom	Shining Waters Family Fun Park; Crystal Palace Amusement Park	Canada	2016; 1991 to 2014	Operating	
Dragon	Force Five	Legoland Dubai	United Arab Emirates	2016	Operating	
Rampage; Formerly The Big One; Formerly The New Roller Coaster; Formerly Roller Coaster	Tivoli Custom	The Big Sheep; The New Metroland (known simply as Metroland prior to 1996 rebrand)	United Kingdom	2016; 1988 to 2008	Operating	
Voglwuide Sepp	Force Custom	Rodel- und Freizeitparadies St. Englmar	Germany	2016	Operating	
Crazy Taxi Coaster	Force Two	Trans Studio Mini Surabaya inside the Transmart Lenmarc Mall Surabaya	Indonesia	2017	Operating	
Dragon	Force Five	Legoland Japan	Japan	2017	Operating	
Serpent	Force Two	Parc du Petit Prince	France	2017	Operating	
Snake Coaster	ESC 535	Jungleland	Indonesia	2017	SBNO	
En avant Seccotine	Force Zero	Parc Spirou Provence	France	2018	Operating	
Flyvende Ørn	Force 281	Legoland Billund	Denmark	2018	Operating	
Jungle Coaster	Force Two	Chimelong Ocean Kingdom	China	2018	Operating	
Jungle Rally	Force Zero	Djurs Sommerland	Denmark	2018	Operating	
Penguin Coaster	Force Zero	Chimelong Ocean Kingdom	China	2018	Operating	
Pioneer	ESC Custom	OK Corral	France	2018	Operating	
Rollercoaster Wikingów	Force Two	Holiday Park Kownaty	Poland	2018	Operating	
Spirou Racing	ESC 535	Parc Spirou Provence	France	2018	Operating	
Tabalugas Achterbahn	Force Two	Holiday Park	Germany	2018	Operating	
Van Lake Monster	Force Two	Osmaniye Masal Park	Turkey	2018	Operating	
Wanted Dalton	Force Two	Parc Spirou Provence	France	2018	Operating	
Balatoni Hullámvasút	Force 281	Zobori Élmény Park	Hungary	2019	Operating	
Barracuda; Formerly Flitzer	Flitzer	Jolly Roger Amusement Park; Jenkinson's Boardwalk	United States	2019; 1992 to 2018	Operating	
Devin Kileri	ESC 535	Wonderland Eurasia	Turkey	2019	SBNO	
Drachen Höhle; Formerly Black Hole	Hell Diver	Freizeit-Land Geiselwind; Freizeit-Land Geiselwind; Movie Park Germany	Germany	2019; 2014; 1989	Operating	
Ejderha Uçuşu	Force 190	Wonderland Eurasia	Turkey	2019	SBNO	
Flight School	Force 281	Emerald Park	(Republic of Ireland) Ireland	2019	Operating	
Fun Pilot	Force 190	Walibi Belgium	Belgium	2019	Operating	
Kamelen	Force Zero	Tivoli Gardens	Denmark	2019	Operating	
Runaway Tram	Force 281	Morey's Piers	United States	2019	Operating	
Achterbahn	Force Two	Ticiland	Switzerland	2020	Operating	
Bayou Express; Formerly Karavanen	Tivoli Small (Variant)	Le Fleury; Tivoli Gardens	France	2020; 1999 to 2018	Operating	
Draken	Force One	Furuvik	Sweden	2020	Operating	
Gold Rush; Formerly Thunderbolt; Formerly Flying Trapeze; Formerly Four Man Bob; Formerly 4 Man Bob	Four Man Bob	Family Park; Loudoun Castle; Grove Land; Flamingo Land; Pleasure Island Family Theme Park; Alton Towers; Trentham	France	2020; 2010; 2002 to 2003; 1998 to 2001; 1993 to 1995; 1985 to 1990; Unknown	Operating	
Dragon	Force Five	Legoland New York	United States	2021	Operating	
Vic's Roller Coaster	Force Two	Majaland Praha	(Czech Republic) Czechia	2021	Operating	
Zor's Coaster	ESC 535	Yerevan Park	Armenia	2021	Operating	
Dragon	Force Five	Legoland Korea	South Korea	2022	Operating	
Farmyard Flyer	Force Custom	Paultons Park	United Kingdom	2022	Operating	
Forza; Formerly Crossbow	ESC 385	Tosselilla; Bowcraft Playland	Sweden	2022; 2006 to 2018	Operating	
Rollercoaster Wikingów	Force Two	Majaland Warschau	Poland	2022	Operating	
Super Grover's Box Car Derby	Force 190	Sesame Place San Diego	United States	2022	Operating	
Eulenblitz	Force Custom	Edelwies Natur-und Freizeitpark	Germany	2024	Operating	
Minifigure Speedway	Force Custom	Legoland Windsor	United Kingdom	2024	Operating	
Smerfowy Rollercoaster	Force Two	Majaland Gdańsk	Poland	2024	Operating	
Beach Rescue Racer	Force	SeaWorld San Antonio	United States	2025	Operating	
Cowabunga Carts	Force 190	Mirabilandia	Italy	2025	Operating	
Dragon	Force Five	Legoland Shanghai	China	2025	Operating	
Bluey The Ride: Here Come The Grannies	Force Custom	Alton Towers	United Kingdom	2026	Operating	
Chase's Mountain Mission	Force Custom	Chessington World of Adventures	United Kingdom	2026	Operating	
Dream Grand Prix	Force 281	Dream Island	Russia	2026	Operating	
Rhonda's Trollfest Express	Force 190	Universal Kids Resort	United States	2026	Operating	
Kikker8baan	Force Custom	Duinrell	Netherlands	2026	Under Construction	
Lookout Safari; Formerly Kōmbo	Tivoli Medium	Lake Winnepesaukah; Indianapolis Zoo	United States	2026; 2001 to 2026	Under Construction	
Minifigure Speedway	Force Custom	Legoland Billund	Denmark	2026	Operating	
Unknown; Formerly Treetops Rollercoaster	Tivoli Large	Walygator Grand-Est; Oakwood Theme Park	France	2026; 1989 to 2024	Under Construction	
Unknown	Force Two	Majaland Gliwice	Poland	2027	Under Construction	
Unknown	Force Custom	Sun World Bà Nà Hills	Vietnam	TBD	Under Construction	
Unknown; Formerly Coccinelle	Tivoli Small	Walibi Belgium	Belgium	TBD; 1999 to 2017	In Storage	
