= Camelot Theme Park =

Former British amusement park

- Camelot's logo (2006–2012)
- Interactive map of Camelot Theme Park
- Location: Charnock Richard, Chorley, Lancashire, England
- Coordinates: 53°38′07″N 2°41′51″W
- Status: Defunct
- Opened: 1983
- Closed: 2 September 2012
- Owner: The Story Group
- Slogan: The land of great knights, and amazing days
- Operating season: May – September
- Area: 140 acres (57 ha)

Camelot Theme Park was a resort and theme park located in Charnock Richard, Lancashire, England. The park's theme was the legend of Camelot, and the park decor incorporated pseudo-medieval elements. It was located on a 140-acre (57 ha; 0.22 sq mi) site owned by The Story Group and was operated by Knights Leisure. The park featured many rides, taking a target audience of families and younger children; however, the park also boasted numerous thrill rides and roller coasters, including Whirlwind (a Maurer Söhne spinning coaster), Knightmare and Excalibur. On 4 November 2012, Knight’s Leisure announced that they would not be reopening for the season of 2013.

The site was used for a zombie horror experience attraction Camelot Rises between February and April 2022.

== History ==
The local area was once covered by Martin Mere, sometimes described as the largest body of fresh water in England, which was first drained in 1692 by Thomas Fleetwood of Bank Hall in Bretherton.

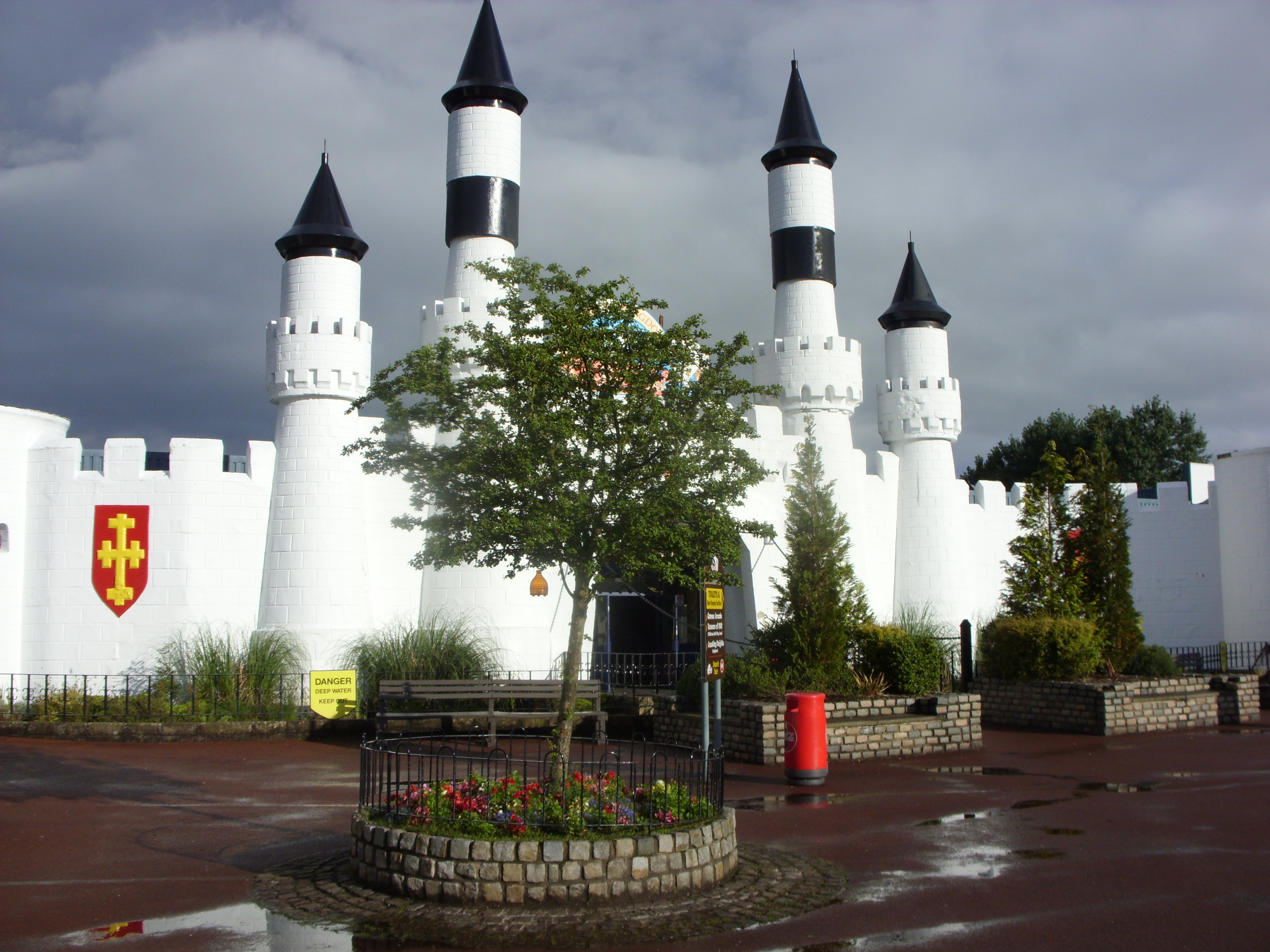
Castle Entrance, Camelot

The park opened in 1983 and was operating seasonally until the end of 2012. The park was based on the story of 'Camelot, King Arthur and the Knights of the Round Table'. The story was that Sir Lancelot's parents King Ban of Benwick and his queen Elaine escaped to Lancashire from their enemies in France. Elaine went to help King Ban who had fallen and put Lancelot down on the shore of the lake, where he was abducted by nymph Vivian who vanished into the waters of the lake with him. Vivian brought up Lancelot, and when he went to King Arthur's court, he was knighted as 'Sir Lancelot of the Lake'. Martin Mere has been locally known as the 'Lost Lake of Sir Lancelot' following the myth.

In 1986, the park was taken over by the Granada Group and operated by them alongside its now-defunct sister parks American Adventure and Granada Studios Tour. In June 1998, the park was subject to a management buyout, in which the park went to Prime Resorts Ltd. Camelot had seen a downturn in attendance in later years, in 1995, Camelot's attendance was 500,000 visitors throughout the season.

The park was featured in a 1994 episode of Sooty & Co., in which presenter Matthew Corbett takes Sooty, Sweep, Soo and Little Cousin Scampi there. The park was also featured in a lengthy sequence in Michael Winterbottom's 1995 crime drama Butterfly Kiss.

One of the roller coasters could be seen from the M6 near the Charnock Richard Services. However, as of February 2020 said rollercoaster "The Knightmare" has been demolished after SBNO (Standing But Not Operating) for eight years.

In 2005, Camelot's attendance was only 336,204 visitors.

In August 2006, in a survey of healthy food available at leading tourist attractions in the United Kingdom, Camelot came joint bottom, scoring only one point.

In February 2009, Prime Resorts announced that the park was in receivership, and would not reopen for the 2009 season. The hotel was bought by Lavender Hotels in March 2009, and in April 2009, it was announced that a buyer had been found for the park and that it would reopen in May 2009. The theme park was purchased by Story Group, a construction company based in Carlisle, and leased to Knight's Leisure who ran the park.

== Closure ==
The closure of the park was announced by its operator, Knights Leisure, on 4 November 2012, the managing director blaming poor summer weather and events such as London 2012 and the Diamond Jubilee for declining visitor numbers. Some roller coasters were sold, for example, the Whirlwind was relocated to Skyline Park in Germany, but others remained in the abandoned park.

The site's future was uncertain, as the new owner was planning to redevelop the site. The then indications were that it would be a housing development.

== Future ==
In August 2014, an application to build 420 houses on the site by owners Story Group was unanimously rejected by Chorley Council, with 261 public objections, as the development was not permissible within the Green Belt.

In August 2016, a second application to build two hundred houses on the site was announced.

In March 2018, plans for 195 homes at the site were scrapped.

All planning applications to date (as of January 2022) have been rejected by Chorley Council.

In December 2020, bulldozers were on site, demolishing a number of the structures that were considered unstable, including the iconic white castle entrance.

By July 2021, the park had been dismantled and demolished, albeit having been in derelict condition and damaged several times by arson and vandalism since the park’s closure in 2012. Parts of some of the rides and pieces of the park still stand on the site, though in February 2020, Knightmare, the signature ride at the park, was dismantled after being standing and left in the elements for eight years.

== Camelot Rises ==
Between February and April of 2022, the former theme park site was used for a drive-thru zombie-themed horror experience operated by Park N' Party, named Camelot Rises. Guests would take part in an immersive drive-thru horror experience subsequently watch a horror film at the main entrance while in their cars.

== Rides and shows ==
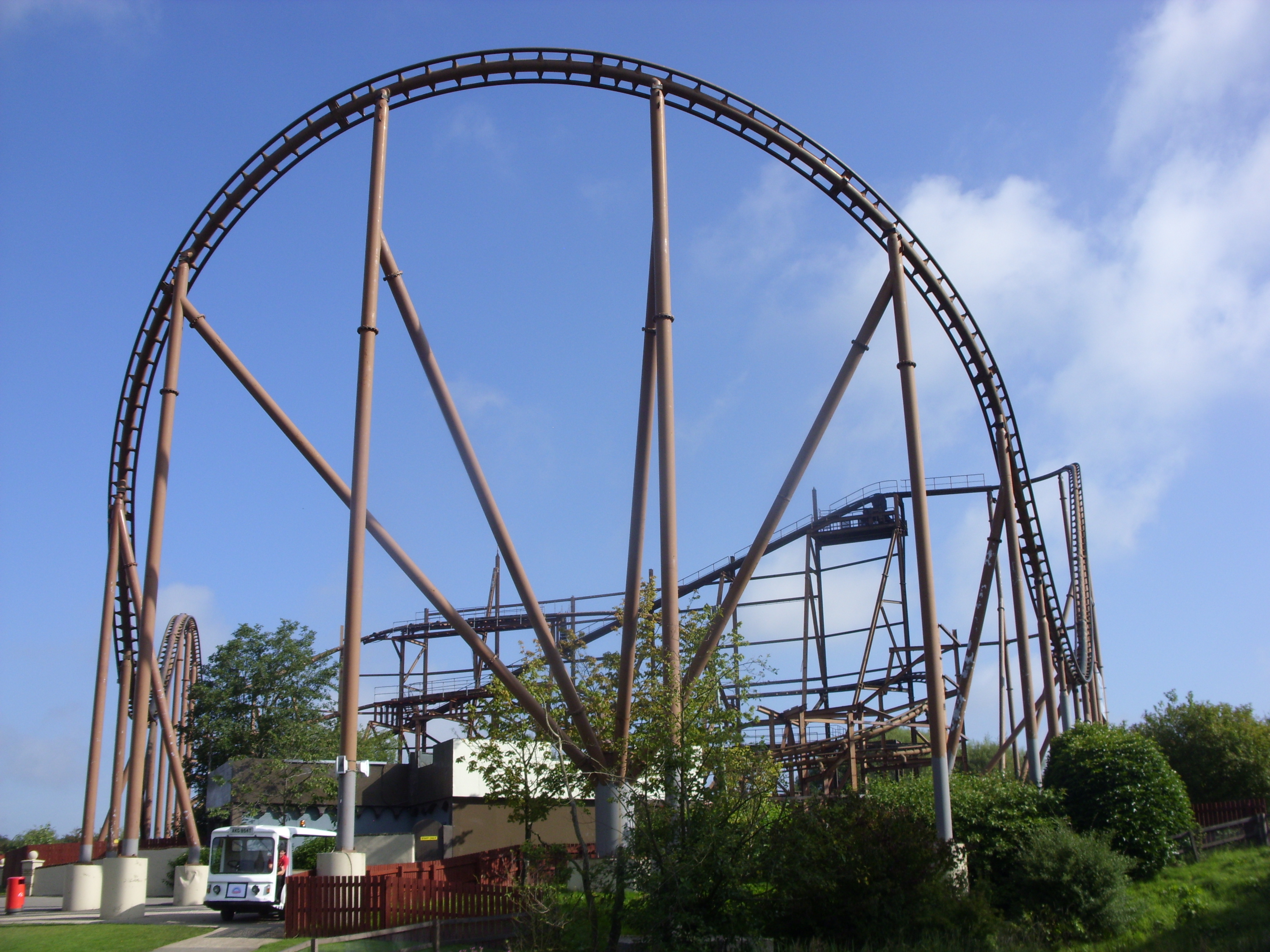
Knightmare Ride, Camelot

=== Rides and attractions ===
The following rides were operating at the time of the park's closure in 2012.

Colour	Target Audience
	Thrill ride
	Family ride
	Children's ride

=== Roller coasters ===
#	Name	Opened	Description
1	Caterpillar Capers	1984	A 'wacky worm' style big apple children's coaster, the ride was relocated to Gulliver's World in Warrington in 2013.
2	Dragon Flyer	1987	One of only two diesel-powered roller coasters in the World. Manufactured by S.C. Italy, this attraction looped the lower section of the park. In 2013, the ride's train was relocated to Pleasureland Southport, however, it was only ever used as a piece of scenery. (The second is located at Jannat Al-Ahlam in Oran, Algeria.)
3	Junior Dragon Coaster	1992	A powered children's coaster, in 2013, the ride was relocated to Oakwood Theme Park.
4	Knightmare	2007	A custom Schwarzkopf / Zierer roller coaster that pulled 5Gs. It was demolished in February 2020. There is a replica of this called Jetline at Gröna Lund.
5	Whirlwind	2003	A Maurer Söhne Xtended SC 2000 spinning coaster, in 2014, the ride was relocated to Skyline Park in Germany.

=== Thrill rides ===
#	Name	Opened	Description
6	Excalibur 2	2001	A Fabbri Evolution. Named after the park's original Excalibur ride. A boy fell from it on 23 August 2011, and in 2013, the ride was relocated to Pleasureland Southport.
7	The Galleon		A non-inverting pirate ship, in 2013, the ride was relocated to Pleasureland Southport.

=== Family rides ===
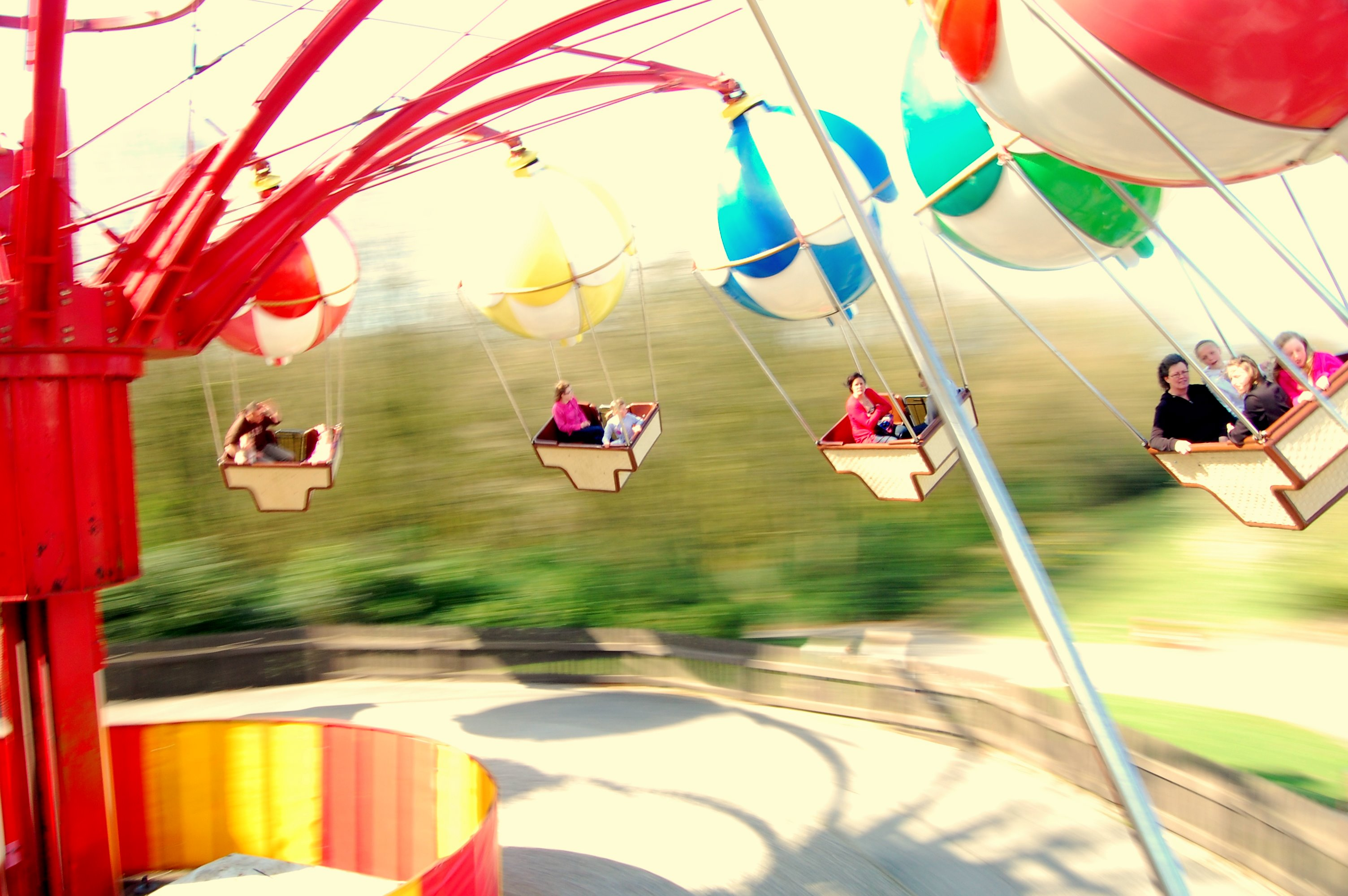
Balloon race ride at Camelot

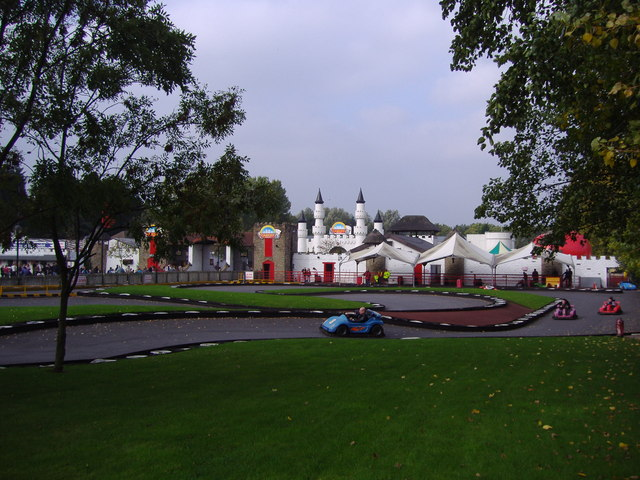
Go‐kart track by the main entrance

#	Name	Opened	Description
8	Dungeons of Doom	1994	Small ghost train style dark ride
9	Falcon's Flight	1988	Zamperla rotating balloon race. In 2013, the ride was relocated to Gulliver's Land in Milton Keynes.
10	Formula-K Go-Karts		Required an extra charge.
11	Jousting Knights Dodgems		Bumper cars located in the park's family entertainment centre. It was intended to be relocated to Oakwood Theme Park but was not due to cost.
12	Kingdom in the Clouds	1987	A Ferris Wheel overlooking the Knight's Valley area of the park. In 2013, the ride was relocated to Pleasureland Southport.
13	Pendragon's Plunge	1997	Set of three blue waterslides, taking riders from the entrance down to Knight's Valley. In 2013, two of the slides relocated to Gulliver's Kingdom in Matlock. The remaining slide (rightmost) historically failed to carry riders to the bottom and was decommissioned.
14	Sir Lancelot's Chargers		An ornate two-tier carousel. In 2013, the ride was relocated to Pleasureland Southport.
15	Camelot Cascade	1986	The log flume ride, in 2013, the ride was relocated to Oakwood Theme Park in Wales.

=== Children's rides ===
#	Name	Opened	Description
16	Bertie Bassett's Driving School		Extra charge was required
17	Clown Around	1980s	Roundabout
18	Cup 'n' Sorcerer		In 2014, the ride was relocated to Oakwood Theme Park in Wales.
19	Human Cannonball		
20	Junior Galleon		A junior swinging pirate ship, in 2013, the ride was relocated to Oakwood Theme Park in Wales.
21	Junior Jousting Horses		
22	Kiddies' Indoor Playland		Soft indoor play area
23	Playland Express		Small circuit electric train, in 2013 the ride was relocated to Oakwood Theme Park.
24	Sky Divers		
25	Towers of Fun		Soft indoor play area

=== Shows ===
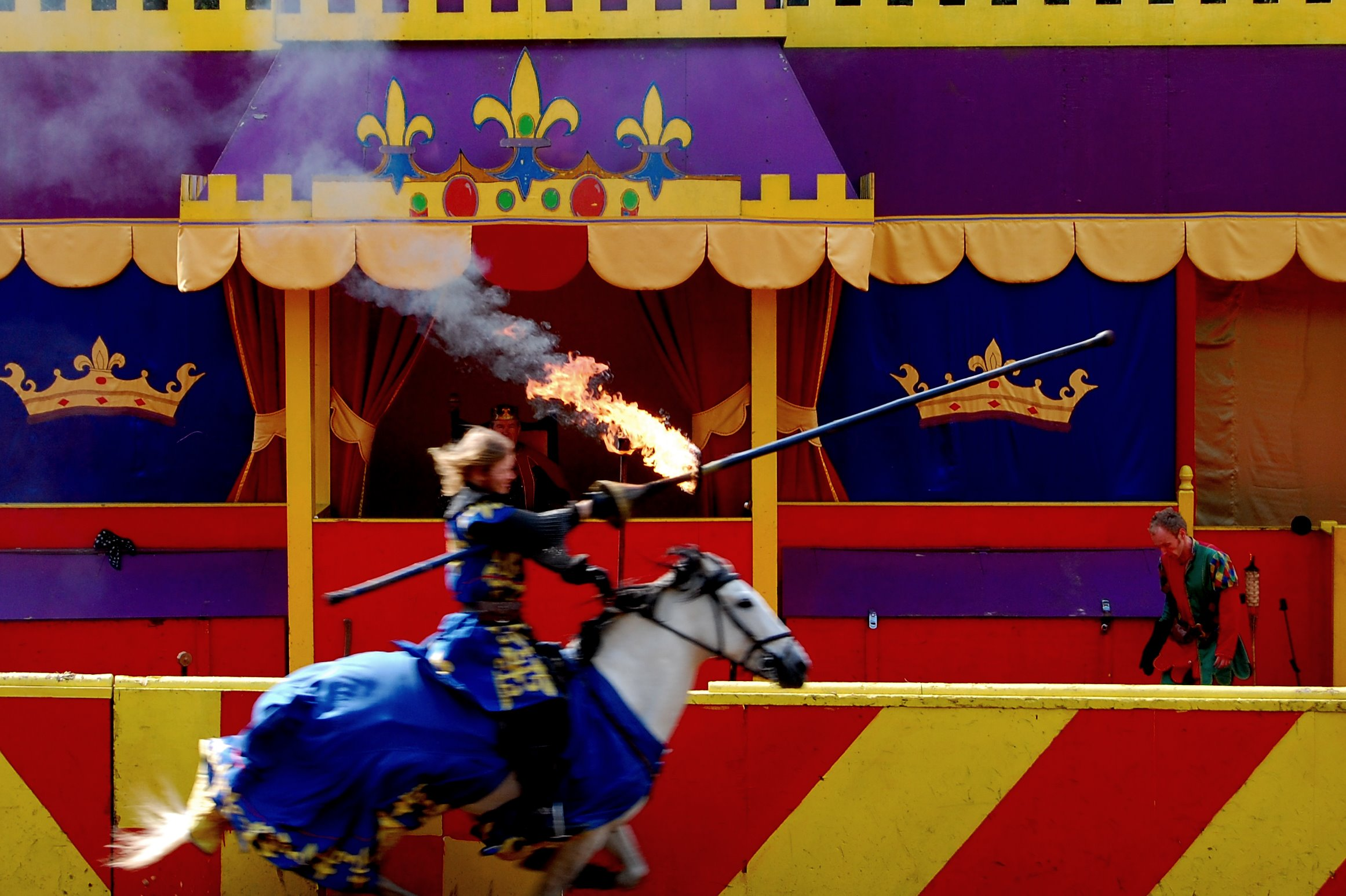
Jousting Tournament show

- Jousting Tournament – a live joust performed by Camelot's own Knights, led by an actor playing King Arthur and performed in the Avalon Arena. The park hosted the only full-time jousting arena in the United Kingdom.
- Merlin's Magic Show – performed in Merlin's castle, this show demonstrated 'Merlin's magical skills'.
- Merlin's School of Wizardry – performed in Merlin's castle, Merlin's School of Wizardry taught some of Merlin's magic to the audience.
- Birds of Prey Show – performed daily in the Avalon Arena, featuring an African fish eagle.

=== Other defunct attractions ===
==== Past rides ====
#	Name	Opened	Closed	Description
	Tower of Terror	1989	2000	A steel sit down roller coaster manufactured by Schwarzkopf. It had the same layout as Scorpion at Busch Gardens Tampa. It was removed in 2000, to make way for a Vekoma Invertigo, and also due to cost issues as the ride was leased along with the original Excalibur from the Bembom Brothers. However, planning permission was denied for this ride, so the park was forced to replace the ride with a Pinfari ZL42, "The Gauntlet" (since closed). While the ride was being taken down, an expanding foam castle which was part of the rides theming was burned down, when some sparks from a saw hit it. The ride itself was unscathed, and after a brief period at Dreamland Margate, it became the Twist N' Shout located at Henk Bembom's now closed Loudoun Castle. It is now at Fun Park Biograd, called "Big Blue".
	The Rack	1994	2010	Vekoma Canyon Trip, the only split level ride in Europe. It was generally unreliable, and in 2009, it suffered a severe mechanical failure, which was not economical to repair. It was removed for the following season.
	Excalibur	1995	2000	Was a Weber Dreamboat (Traumboot) and was removed with the Tower of Terror. It stood originally on the site of the Whirlwind; however, the space the Tower of Terror originally took up was more than enough for the replacement Gauntlet Pinfari roller coaster and the Excalibur 2 (Fabbri Evolution). This left a site vacant, which was later used for the Whirlwind
	The Beast/Venom		2005	A steel powered dark-roller coaster. It was removed in 2005, due to increasing safety regulations with indoor roller coasters. While operated, the ride was enclosed inside a building and kept in the dark. When first opened, the ride was originally called "The Knightmare" and was an outdoor coaster. In 1985, a mountain theme was placed over "The Knightmare", and its name was changed to "Space Mountain". In 1988, the indoor coaster was renamed and re-themed "The Beast" and featured the best audio for the ride, before the train moved from the station. In the mid-1990s, "The Beast" was renamed "Venom". This building was removed in 2001, to make way for an extension to the Castle Camelot entertainment centre, which would have created an extended indoor entertainment centre including replacement ride. However, when it became apparent the park could close within the next few years, the plans were largely scaled back, leaving room for the ride to stay. The building and ride were then rebuilt but was themed as a snake, in a snakes lair. The ride is now owned by Williams Amusements, and the castle was extended to include the new indoor entertainment centre and firstly a Rollerquest (Lasertag) attraction, and then the Dodgems.
	The Sorcerer	1995	1997	A Pinfari roller coaster. It was considered too small to be a roller coaster, and it was not as popular with guests as the park hoped. Its presence was faded by the ever-popular Tower of Terror.
	The Quintain		2005	A Huss Flipper, and was removed before the season of 2006 started and was replaced by a carousel. It was thought by many guests that the ride was not suitable for the target audience of the park.
	The Gauntlet			A Pinfari ZL42 looping roller coaster. During 2002 and 2003, the ride experienced considerable downtime. After a refurbishment of the trains and braking system, the ride had two very good seasons. To further improve the ride, a new train was purchased in 2005. The ride was then moved to make way for the Knightmare Ride. The ride then operated at New Pleasureland in Southport for a short time. It has now been refurbished and rebuilt in the Marina Park, Varna, Bulgaria.
	Carousel			Smaller of the two Carousels in the park was removed after the season of 2006, due to its age and being shaded by the much more extravagant carousel located close by. The Junior Galleon WAS moved to the front of the Playland building, to occupy the carousel's central spot.
	Leverets			A small children's ride located at the side of the Rack (previous locations include: the side of the original Excalibur, and at the front of the park, under a different name). It was removed after the season of 2006, due to the cars and track becoming unreliable. The ride was often closed when the park was open and was replaced by a gnome garden.
	Mad Monastery			Dark funhouse ride, situated at the back of the Playland area
	Dragon Heights	1987		Spinning Ride. Three pink dragons located behind The Beast and rotated through 360 degrees, but did not turn upside down. It was a family version of the 'Rainbow' style magic carpet ride that was at Blackpool Pleasure Beach. It was removed due to being unreliable.
	Splashpool			Located behind the white castle, and removed before the extension of the Indoor Entertainment Centre.

==== Past shows ====
- Cats of the Round Table – an animatronic show that was near the front of the park.
- Sooty and the Dragon – a puppet show to do with a popular puppet.

== Accidents ==
- On 22 October 2001, Harry Mathews, a park employee, was struck by The Gauntlet roller coaster and was killed whilst repairing the tracks. The park was fined £40,000, and charged £20,000 in costs in September 2003, as it had no written safety procedures for its staff.
- On 23 August 2011, a twelve-year-old boy fell 30 ft from the Excalibur 2 ride. He survived but suffered serious injuries.

== See also ==
- Incidents at European amusement parks
