= Lisebergbanan =

Amusement ride

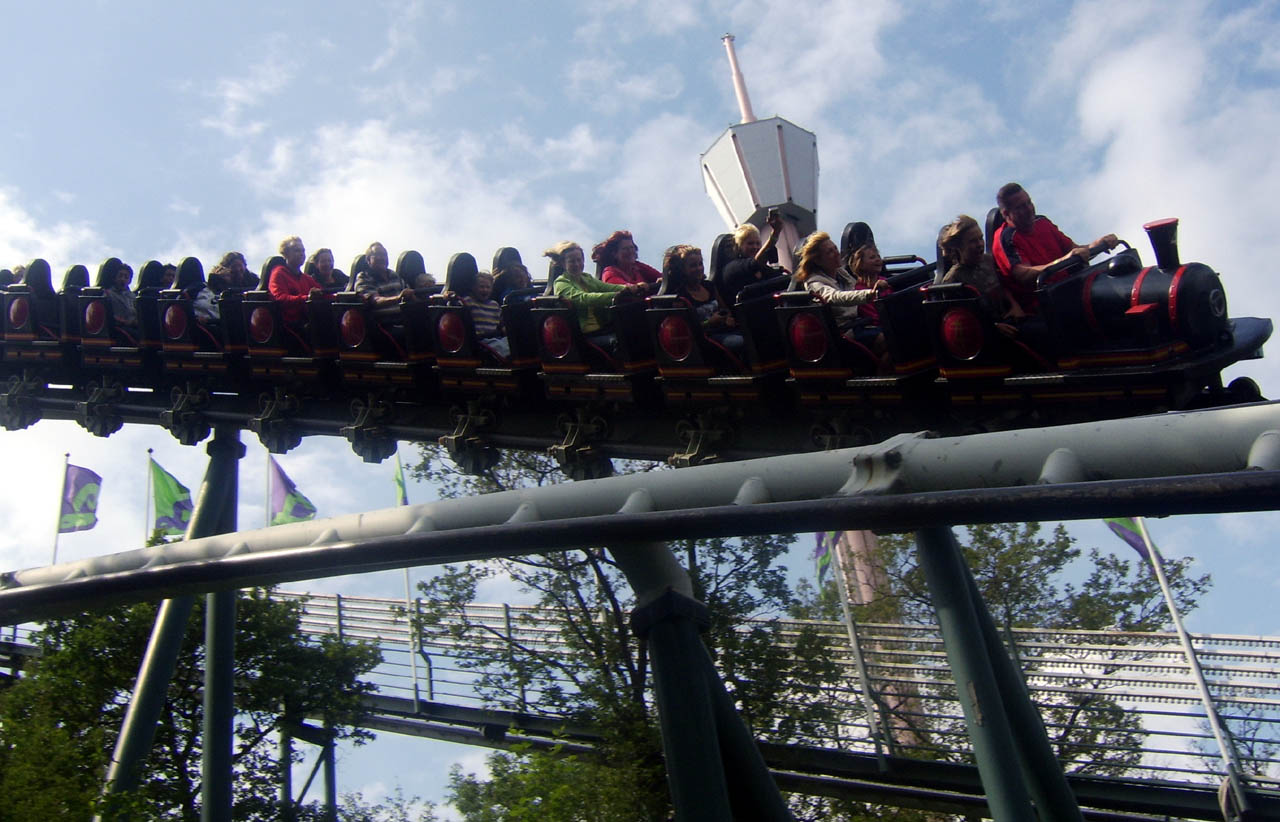
- Lisebergbanan roller coaster

Liseberg
- Location: Liseberg
- Coordinates: 57°41′42″N 11°59′33″E
- Status: Operating
- Opening date: 18 April 1987

General statistics
- Type: Steel
- Manufacturer: Zierer
- Designer: Werner Stengel, Anton Schwarzkopf
- Model: Custom steel
- Lift/launch system: Chain lift hill
- Height: 45 m (148 ft)
- Length: 1,548 m (5,079 ft)
- Speed: 80 km/h (50 mph)
- Inversions: 0
- Capacity: 2000 riders per hour
- G-force: 3
- Trains: 5 trains with 11 cars. Riders are arranged 2 across in a single row for a total of 22 riders per train.
- Lisebergbanan at RCDB

Video
- Video showing the entire ride from a first person view.

Lisebergbanan is a steel roller coaster at the Liseberg amusement park in Gothenburg, Sweden. It opened in 1987.

The ride's name literally means "Liseberg rail line" and the station is themed to a railway station. A themed restaurant was later opened under Lisebergbanan's station with a similar theme, allowing guests to dine inside replica freight and passenger carriage compartments. The ride has five trains consisting of 11 cars. Each car seats two riders and as such, the ride boasts a large guest throughput.

== History ==
When Anton Schwarzkopf's company went bankrupt, Schwarzkopf worked with Zierer to produce several roller coasters. Lisebergbanan was the first of these rides, and it has been said that this was Schwarzkopf's favorite roller coaster. The roller coaster opened in 1987 and has been regarded by the park since as a 'true classic'.

== Accident ==
In 2006, 21 people were injured at Liseberg when two of the roller coaster's trains collided. The crash happened as the chain that pulls trains up the initial climb malfunctioned, causing a fully loaded train to roll backward into the starting platform, hitting another train that was unloading riders. Since only part of the train was on the lift hill, the anti-rollback could not stand the pressure, and broke. Since the accident, the roller coaster has opened again after a technical adjustment.

== Rankings ==
Golden Ticket Awards: Top steel Roller Coasters
Year									1998	1999
Ranking									–	–
Year	2000	2001	2002	2003	2004	2005	2006	2007	2008	2009
Ranking	–	–	–	–	–	–	–	–	–	–
Year	2010	2011	2012	2013	2014	2015	2016	2017	2018	2019
Ranking	–	–	–	–	–	35	38	40	42	47 (tie)
Year	2020	2021	2022	2023	2024	2025				
Ranking	NA	50	–	–	–	–				

== Photos ==
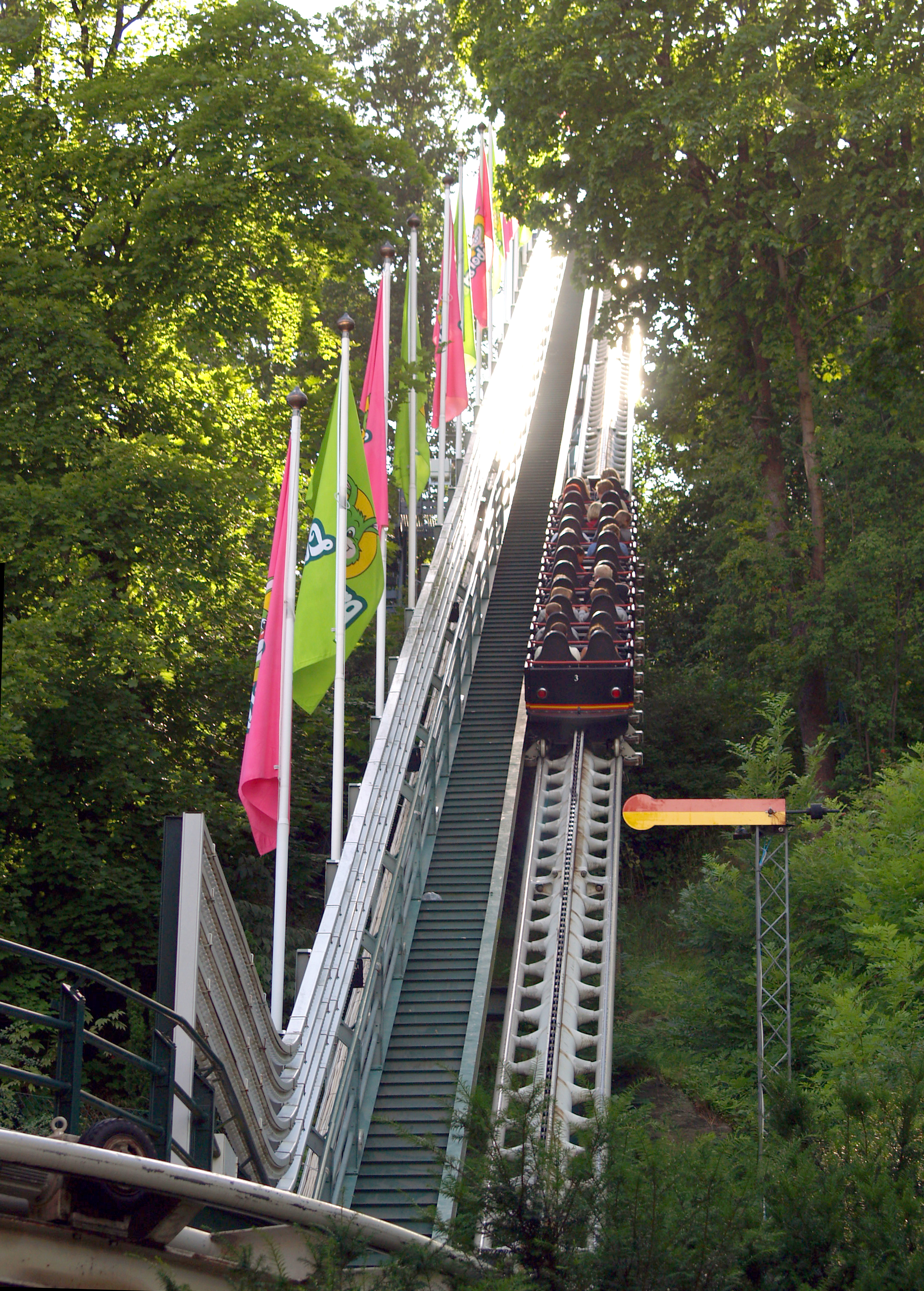

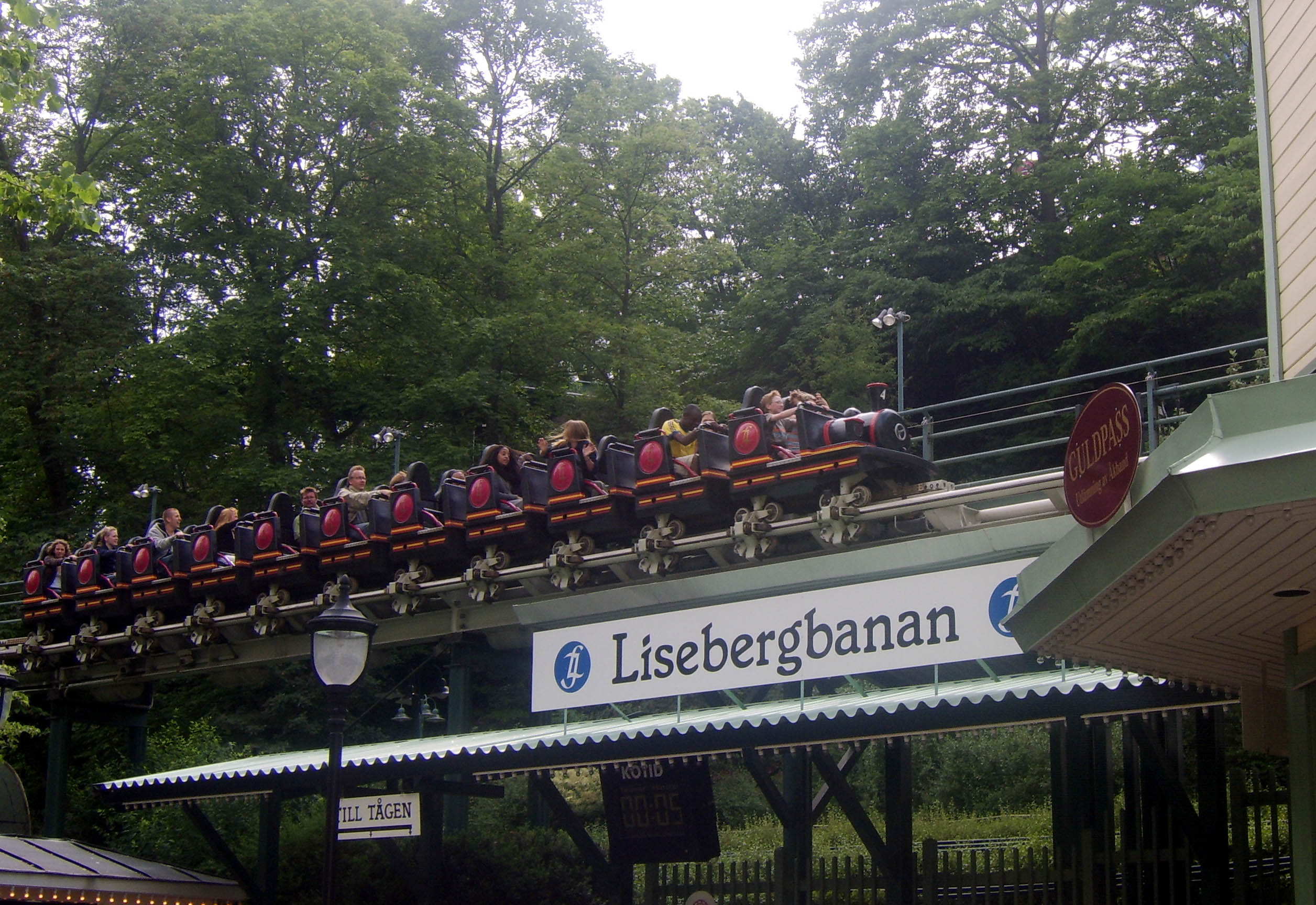
Lisebergbanan train on the final brake run

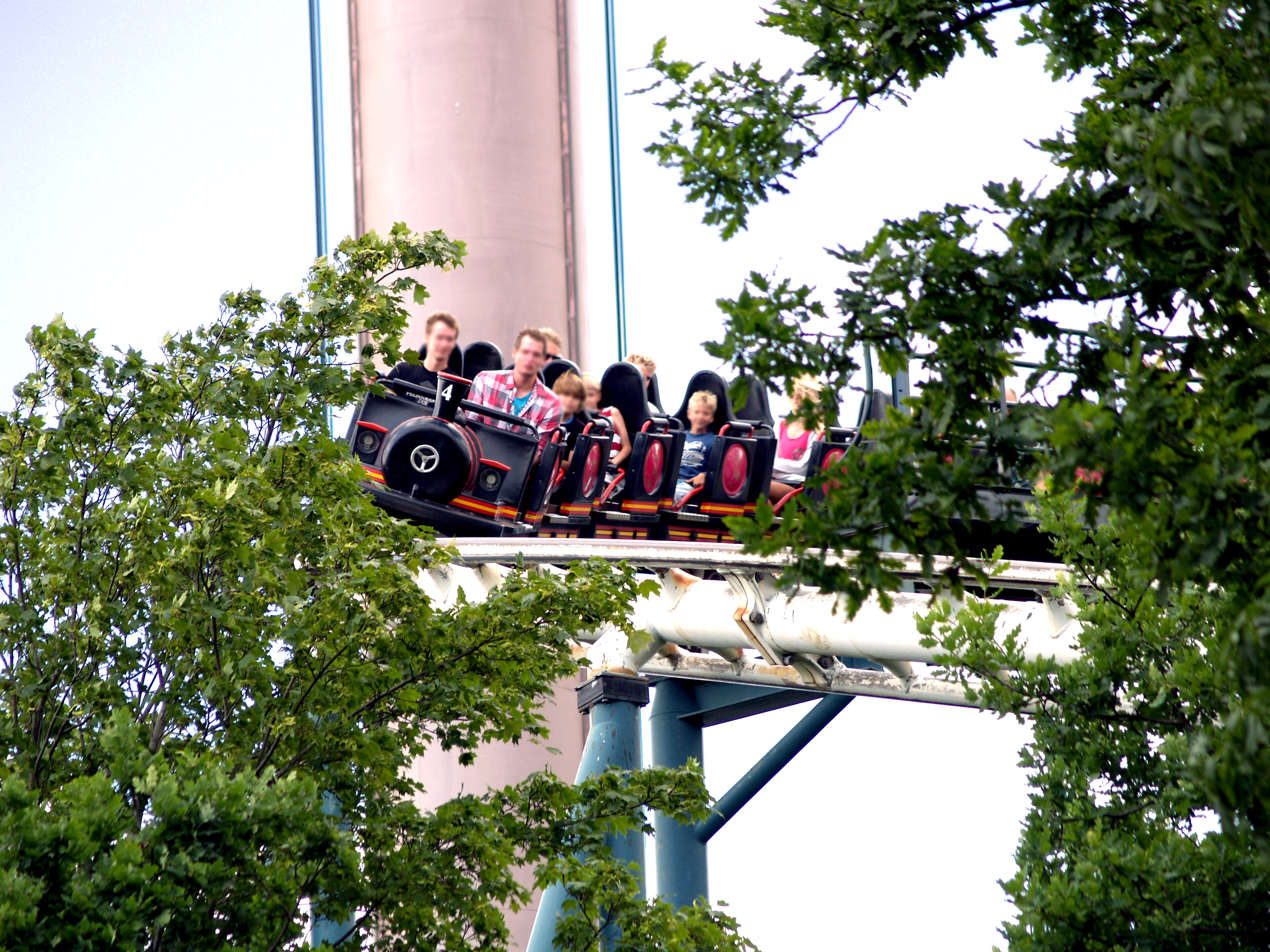

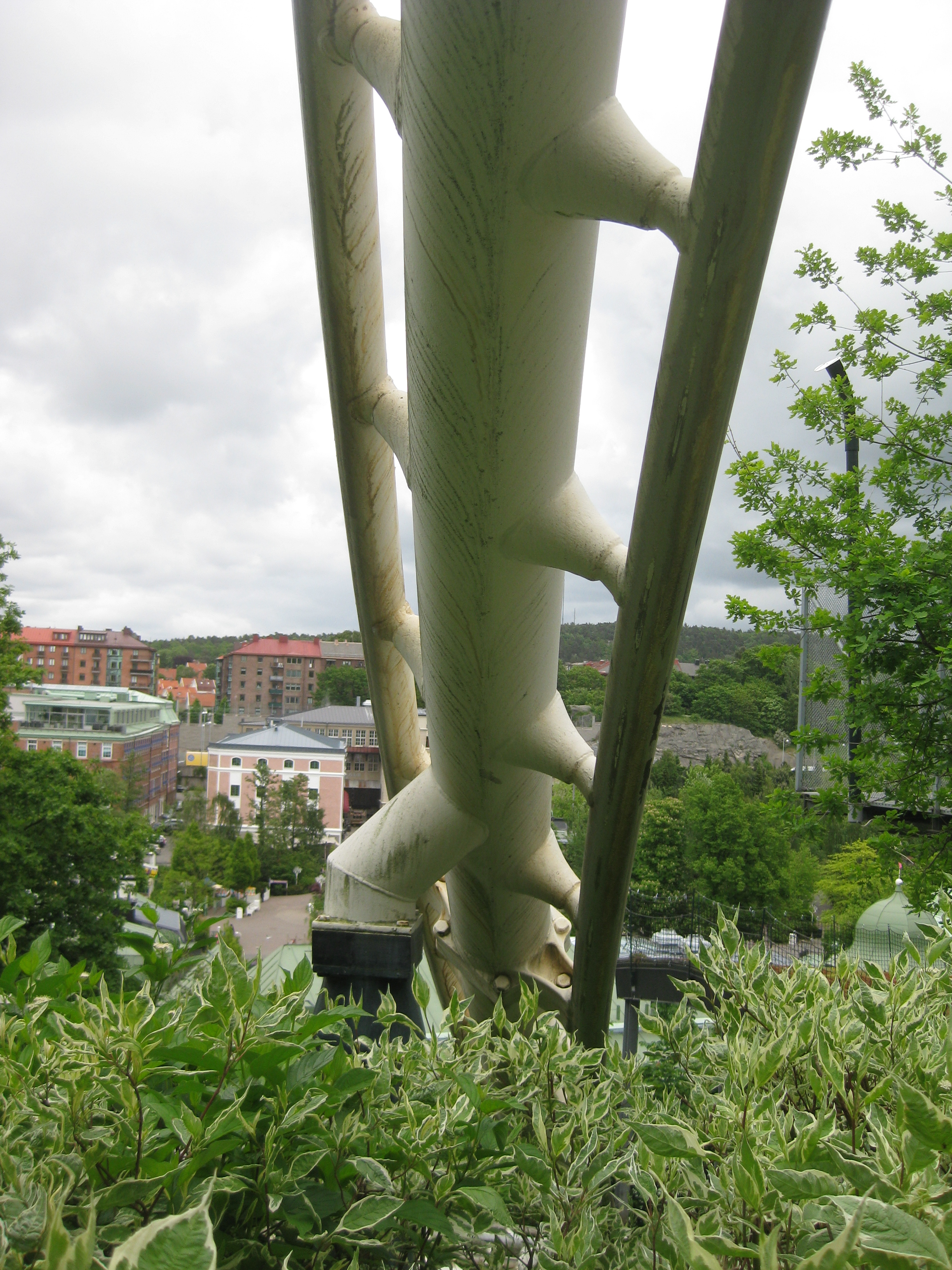

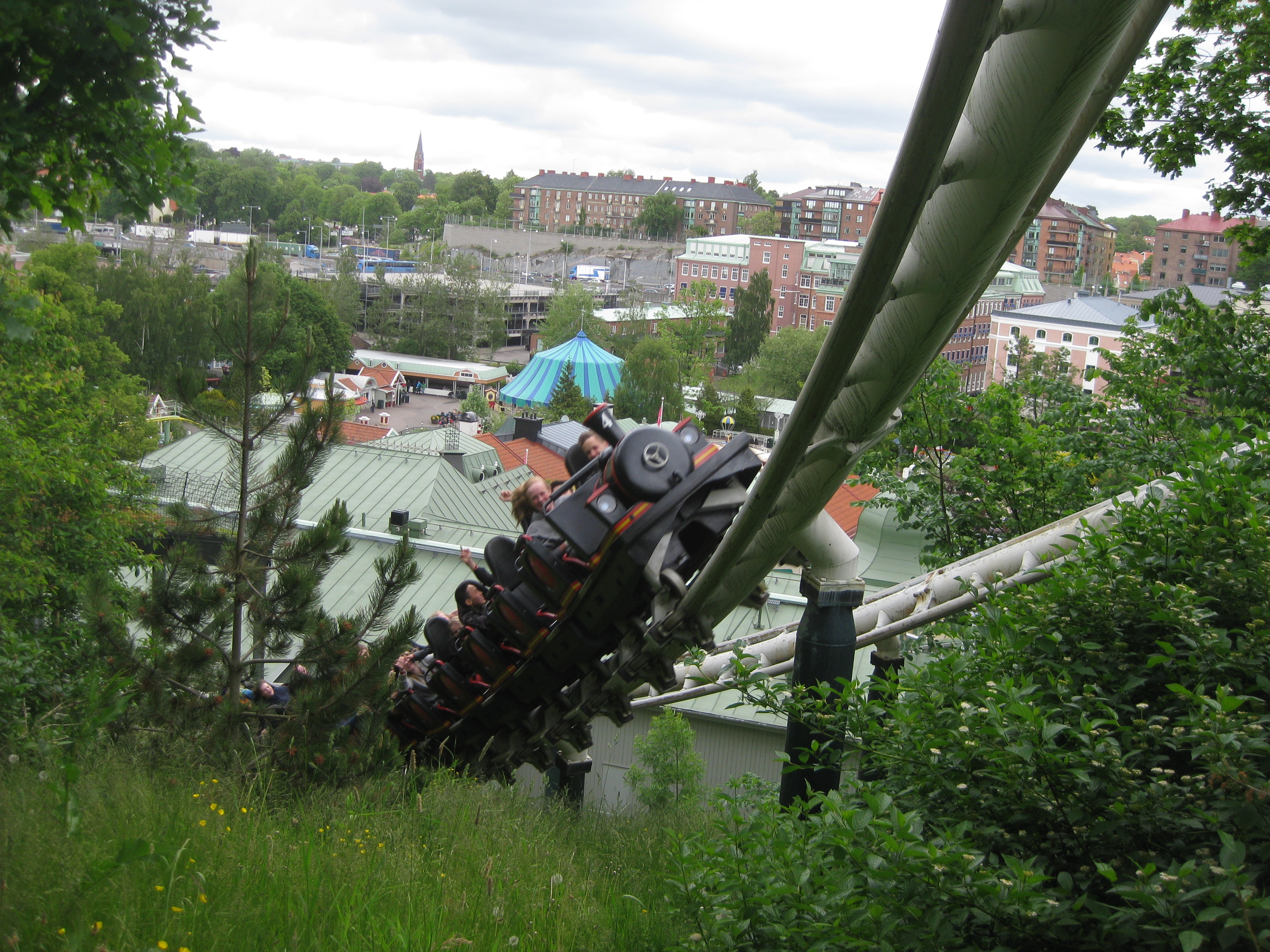

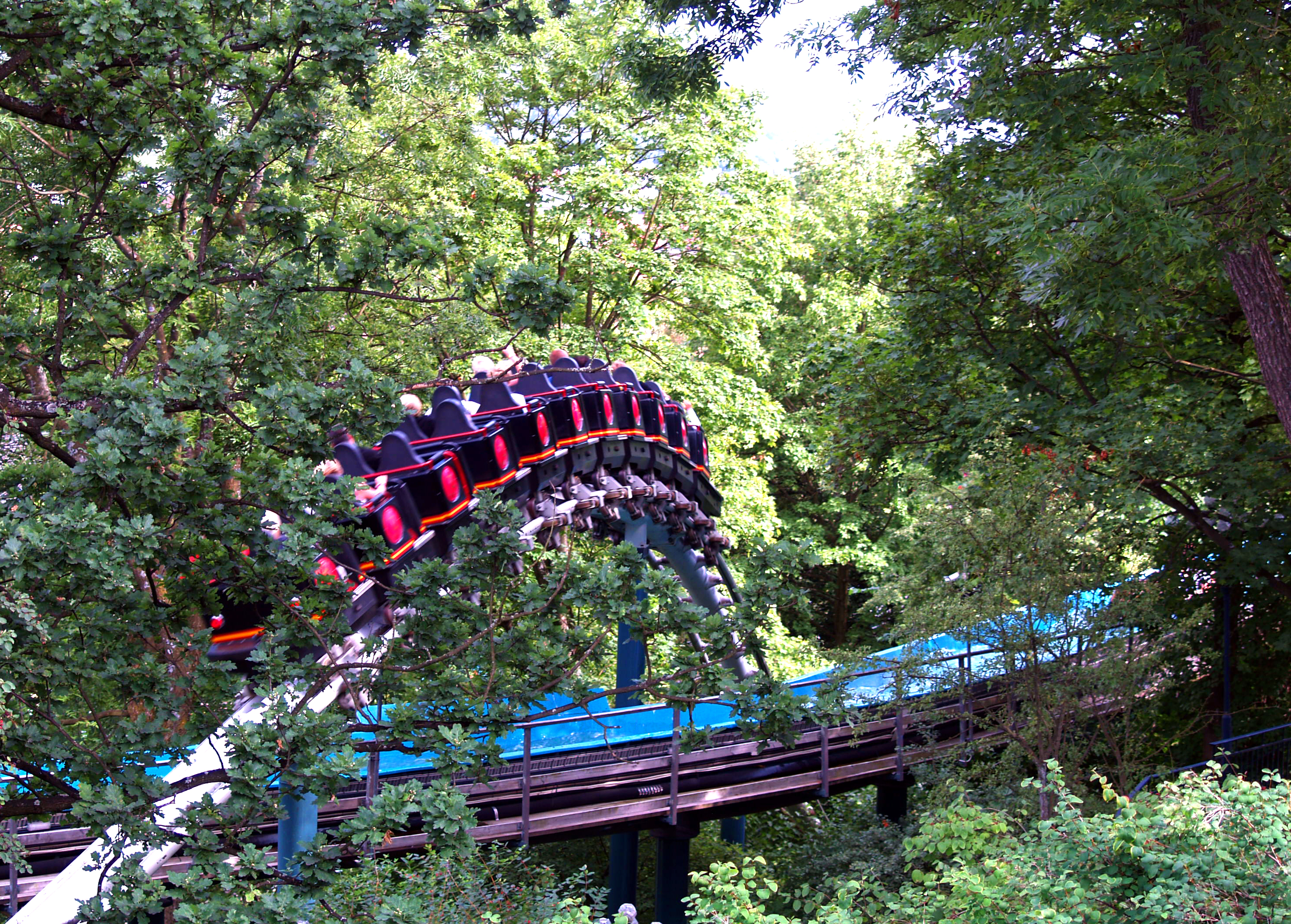
Lisebergbanan meets Flumeride

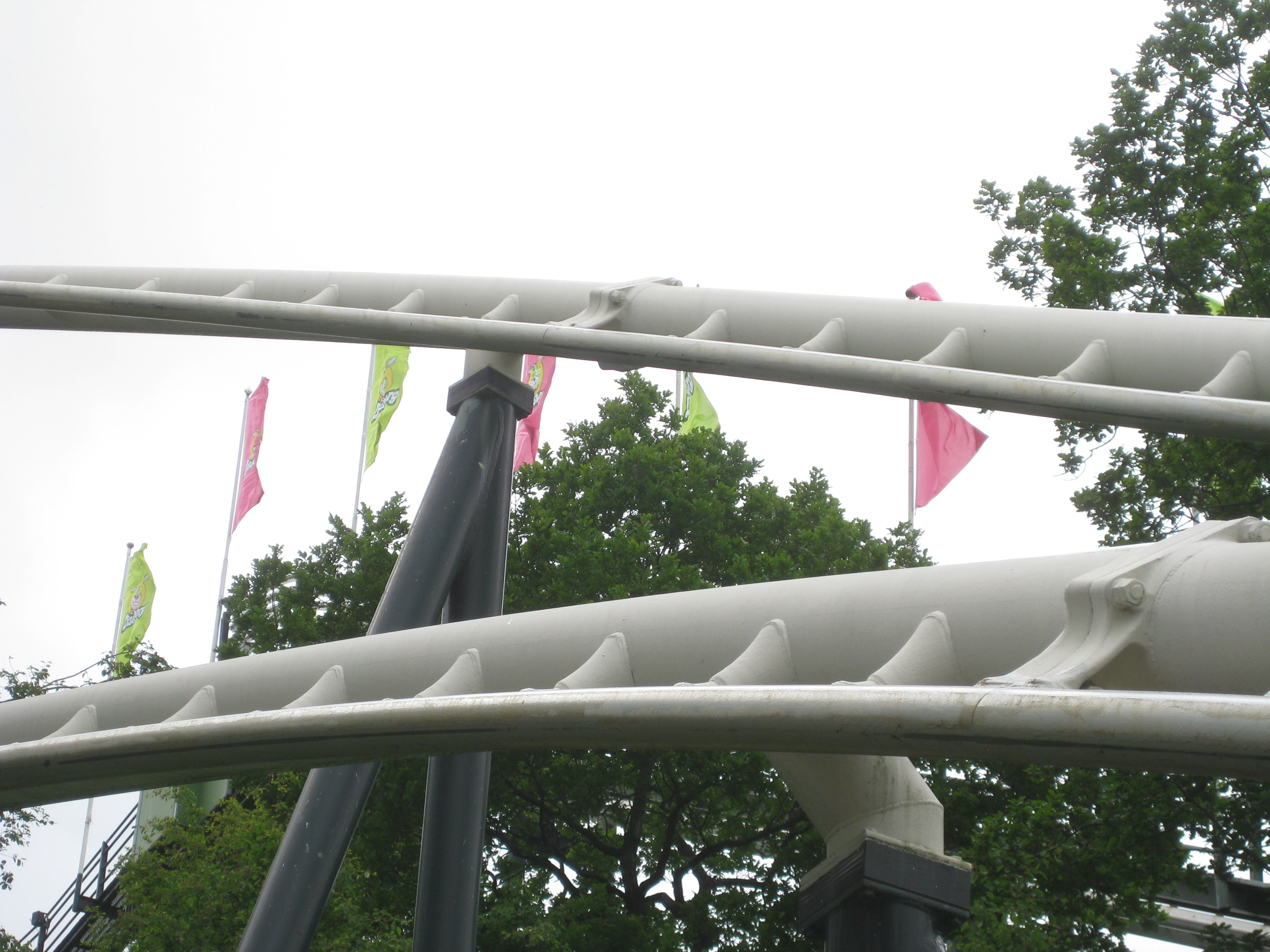

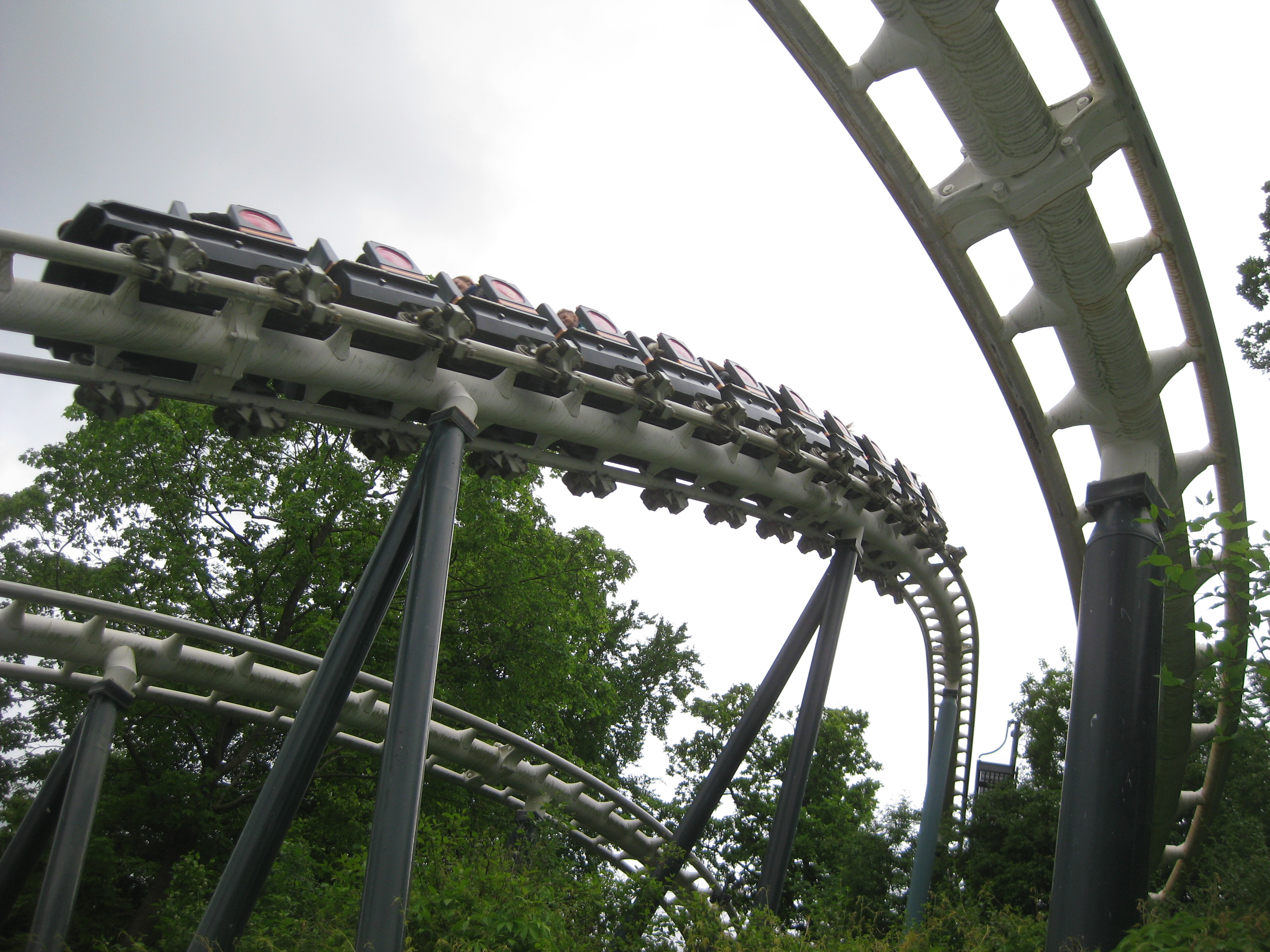
