= Legoland New York =

Lego themed resort in Goshen, New York, United States

Legoland New York Resort

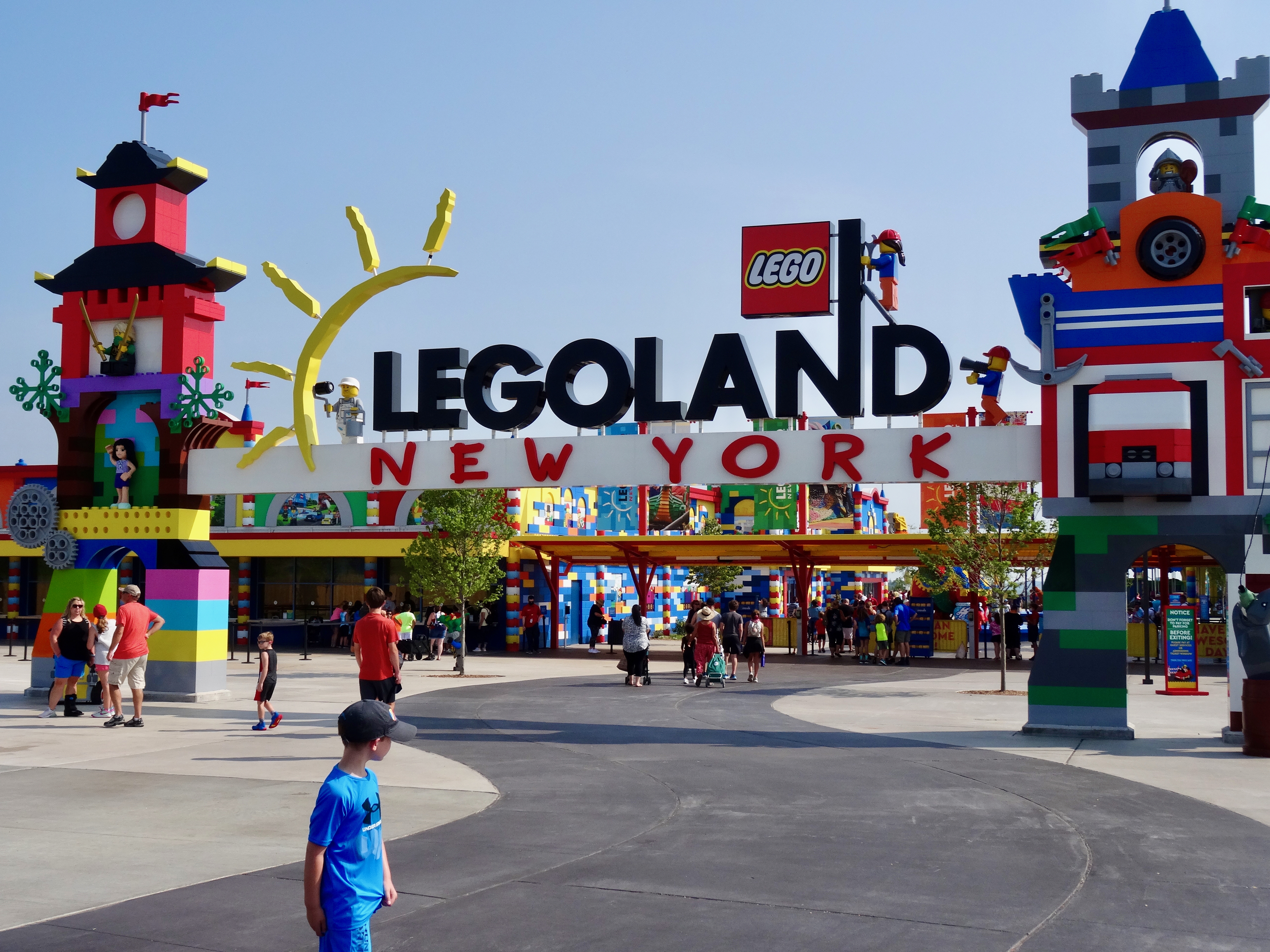
- Legoland New York main entrance
- Interactive map of Legoland New York Resort
- Location: Goshen, New York, United States
- Coordinates: 41°22′41″N 74°18′48″W
- Status: Operating
- Opened: May 29, 2021; 5 years ago (Note: Date of opening for the general public; a soft opening for "first to play" pass holders occurred earlier in May 2021.)
- Owner: Merlin Entertainments
- Operated by: Merlin Entertainments
- Theme: Lego
- Area: 150 acres (61 ha) on 500 acres (200 ha)

Attractions
- Total: 17
- Roller coasters: 2
- Water rides: 4
- Website: https://www.legoland.com/new-york/

Legoland New York Resort is a theme park in Goshen, New York, owned by Merlin Entertainments. Consisting 150 acres (61 ha) of seven Lego themed lands on a property of 500 acres (200 ha). The park contains numerous structures and attractions made of Lego or designed to resemble Lego.

The park initially cost $500 million and took five years to construct. The theme park opened on May 20, 2021, as a soft launch for people who purchased exclusive "1st to play" passes. The official opening for the general public took place on May 29, 2021, making Legoland New York Resort the first outdoor theme park addition to the Northeast since 1974.

== History ==
Legoland New York is the ninth Legoland park worldwide. In the United States, it is the third park following Legoland California (1999), and Legoland Florida (2011).

=== Construction ===
Proposals for a third Legoland location in the United States began in October 2015, when Merlin Entertainments considered constructing a resort in Haverstraw, Rockland County. This proposal included a theme park, water park, and hotel. However, plans were immediately withdrawn due to resident concerns. On May 26, 2016, Legoland New York was reconsidered in the town of Goshen, New York for extra available land, as well as the proximity to the New York metropolitan area. Revised plans would keep the theme park and hotel, but would exclude the water park.

On October 19, 2017, the town of Goshen approved plans for the park and, six days later, on October 25, 2017, Merlin Entertainments officially announced Legoland New York, a 500-acre theme park with a 250-room hotel. New York State's Empire State Development Corporation supported the project by setting aside $10 million to support the expected increase in vehicle traffic, with Meriln Entertainment providing an additional $30 million, for a total of $40 million in funding. As a part of the plan, the westbound ramp for exit 125 on NY 17 was moved 4,000 feet to make it safer for visitors to get on and off the highway, parts of Route 17 and Harriman Drive were given additional lanes, and a bridge was built. The old exit was closed on October 26, 2022, at 9 AM EDT, and was completed in early December of the same year. Capable of being able to handle up to 3,000 cars entering the park on a daily basis, the layout of Exit 125 is compliant to the standards set by the Interstate Highway System, with the intention of converting the section of NY 17 to Interstate 86 sometime in the future.

In late 2019, it was announced that the resort was to open for the general public on July 4, 2020, coinciding with Independence Day. On March 31, 2020, due to the onset of the COVID-19 pandemic in New York, construction on the project was halted, and the opening was pushed back to early 2021. In December 2020 and January 2021, pass holders who purchased their passes in 2019 were given exclusive access inside the first two lands, Brick Street and Bricktopia. Guests were able to look around the two lands and purchase food and merchandise, but no rides were open. On February 19, 2021, the New York State Government announced family attractions will reopen, signaling a Legoland opening of 2021. New York State eventually cleared Legoland to open in April along with other amusement parks in the state.

=== Opening ===
On May 19, 2021, Legoland New York announced its official plan to open the park in phases due to construction delays, as well as opening reservations and ticket purchases for pass holders and the public. The next day, Legoland New York opened for "1st to play" pass holders who paid additional in 2019 for special access to an event before official park opening. Lego City and Lego Pirates were closed during this time. Following that week, on May 29, 2021, Legoland New York officially opened to the general public and other pass holders. This was a soft opening, since Lego Pirates and part of Lego City was still under construction. In conjunction with this, ticket prices were reduced. The Legoland Hotel was also delayed, with the full opening planned later in the summer.

On July 9, 2021, after four years of construction, Legoland New York fully opened with all seven lands and corresponding rides open. Concluding the initial five year construction period for the park costing $500 million. Becoming the first new theme park in the northeast since 1974. Ticket prices returned to normal and the park began to operate daily, but the hotel remained under construction. On August 6, 2021, the Legoland Hotel opened with a grand opening and started accepting overnight stays.

Legoland New York announced that it would open a "water playground" in the Lego City section of the park in 2022, but opening had to be pushed back due to delays. In addition, more paths and stairways were constructed, connecting Miniland with other sections of the park. The water playground opened during Memorial Day weekend 2023.

In early 2024, construction began on a gondola set to open that summer called the "Minifigure Skyflyer" to ease travel between lands separated by a hill. The ride will have interactive elements centered around seven themes anchored by minfigures.

== Park layout ==
The park contains seven Lego themed "lands" based on Lego toy themes, as well as a themed Hotel for overnight stays. It is the world's largest Legoland, taking up 150 acres (61 ha) out of the total 500 acres (200 ha) of land, enabling future expansion.

=== Brick Street ===
The entrance land that transitions guests into the theme park.

Name	Manufacturer	Description
Brick Party	Bertazzon	A carousel that replaces horses with Lego animals and transportation.
Minifigure Skyflyer	Leitner-Poma	A gondola connecting Brick Street to Lego Pirates featuring seven interactive themes.

=== Bricktopia ===
Rides and activities that encourage building with Lego bricks.

Name	Manufacturer	Description
DJ's Dizzy Disco Spin	Mack Rides	A Lego themed teacup ride that includes music.
Duplo Express		A train ride that looks like it is made out of Lego Duplo bricks, running through a loop with Lego Duplo models.
Lego Factory Adventure Ride	ETF/Holovis	A trackless dark ride that takes riders on a journey through the production of Lego elements from the perspective of one. This installation was the first one of its type to be built at a Legoland park. It also uses new advanced ride tracking technology that senses features of riders to match them with Lego minifigures. The ride vehicles are motion enabled and based on real AGV's that operate inside Lego factories.

=== Lego Ninjago World ===
A land based upon the Lego Ninjago toy theme and Asian culture.

Name	Manufacturer	Description
Jay's Gravity Force Trainer		A music express ride.
Lego Ninjago The Ride	Triotech/ART Engineering	A 3D interactive dark ride themed after Lego Ninjago. Unlike most interactive dark rides, this one does not have a device to shoot targets. Instead, new technology was developed to sense rider hand motions. With riders moving their hands in different positions and angles to try and shoot targets on many projected scenes.

=== Lego Castle ===
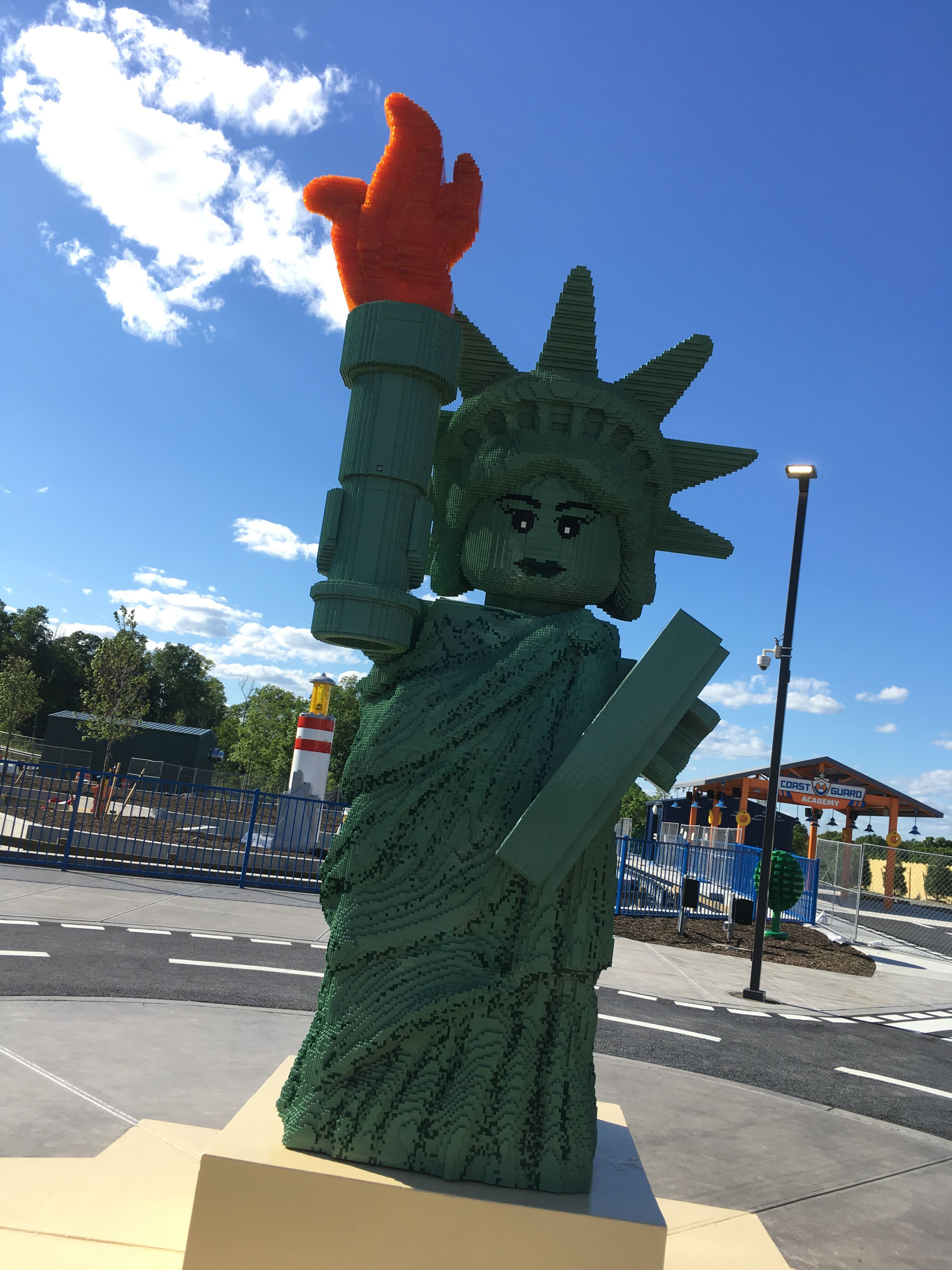
A Statue of Liberty model in Lego City.

A land themed after the Lego Castle toy theme.

Name	Manufacturer	Description
Merlin's Flying Machines	Zamperla	A red baron ride that requires riders to pedal in order to gain height.
The Dragon's Apprentice	Zamperla	A kiddie coaster with ride vehicles that look like baby dragons made out of Lego.
The Dragon	Zierer	A family coaster that starts with a dark ride segment using cars that look like a Lego dragon.
Tower Climb Tournament	SunKid	Guests climb a spinning tower while seated using a rope. Once they reach the top, the vehicle drops to the ground like a drop tower. Guests then climb the tower again, repeating their actions until the ride is stopped.

=== Lego City ===
A land that is made to look like a city and based on the Lego City toy theme.

Name	Manufacturer	Description
Coast Guard Academy	SB International/Hafema	Riders pilot their own boats on a closed course that contains obstacles they need to avoid.
Driving School	SB International	Kids 6-13 can learn to drive by driving their own cars on a closed course that simulates a real city environment.
Fire Academy	Metallbau Emmeln	Riders utilize human power to move a Lego fire engine to a simulated fire and extinguish it, competing against other riders.
Junior Driving School	SB International	A smaller version of Driving School designed for kids 3–5, where cars and the course are smaller.

=== Lego Pirates ===
A land themed after the Lego Pirates toy theme.

Name	Manufacturer	Description
Anchors Away	Zamperla	A rockin' tug ride with the ride vehicle made to look like a Lego made pirate ship.
Rogue Riders	Zierer	A jet ski ride which uses centrifugal force to force vehicles that look like Lego barrels outwards towards water features.
Splash Battle	Lagotronics Projects	Riders board a boat and use water cannons to shoot targets with water, as well as people in the surrounding area.
Minifigure Skyflyer	Leitner-Poma	A gondola connecting Brick Street to Lego Pirates featuring seven interactive themes.

=== Miniland ===
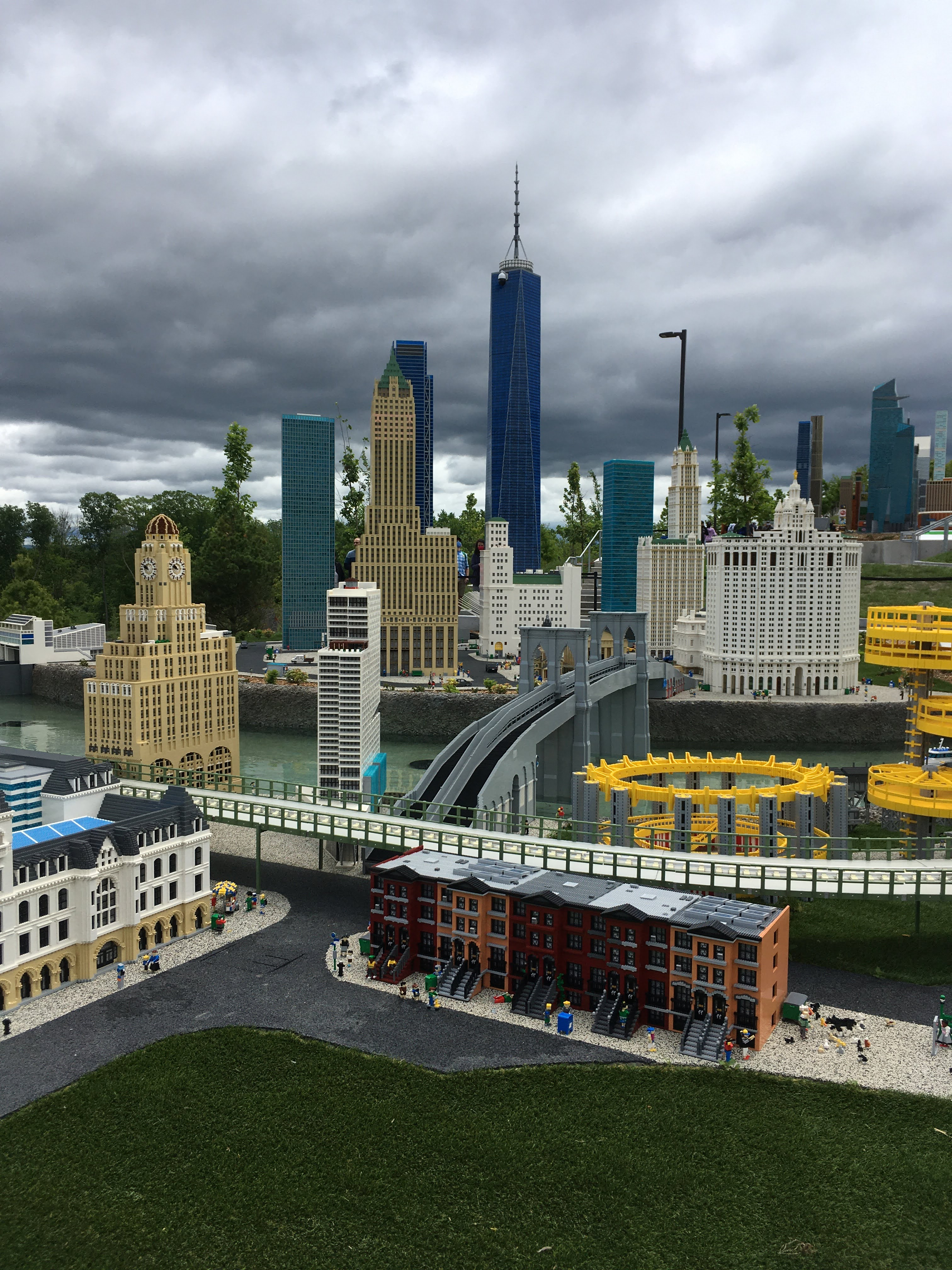
The New York City portion of Miniland.

Miniland contains ten sections of detailed Lego models built by real Lego pieces that replicate real world cities and towns. The main sections replicate the East Coast, Goshen, Las Vegas, Middle America, Midtown, New York City, The Bronx, and the West Coast. This Miniland pays increased tribute to New York State, with increased elements to New York City and its landmarks. Some of the models are interactive to guests.

=== Legoland Hotel ===
The hotel is a 250-room themed resort hotel with four different types of rooms based on the themes Lego Pirates, Lego Friends, Lego Ninjago and Lego Kingdom. There is also a heated pool and restaurant on site. The hotel incorporates technology including self check-in kiosks and Google Nest speakers in every room, replacing phones. The hotel is open year-round, unlike the theme park which is open seasonally.

== Criticism ==
During construction and throughout opening, Legoland New York has faced opposition from locals who worried about the increase in vehicle traffic that would bring increased attention to the originally small town. Residents also had environmental concerns, as runoff during construction has polluted the nearby Otter Kill. The Department Of Environmental Conservation has issued fines of $346,000 during construction for numerous violations.
