= 2022 Furuvik Zoo chimpanzee shootings =

Killing of escaped animals by zoo staff

At around 12 o'clock noon on Wednesday, 14 December 2022, a number of the chimpanzees (Pan troglodytes) kept at Furuvik Zoo (Sw. Furuviksparken) in Furuvik, Gävle Municipality, Sweden, escaped from their enclosure into the chimpanzee building and park and made an attempt to exit the zoo itself, which was closed to the public for the winter season. The zoo staff responded by firing on the escaping apes, killing four of them.

The story gained domestic and international attention, and prompted debate about zoos and the keeping of great apes in captivity. The incident has also been described as "the Massacre in Furuvik", "the Furuvik Bloodbath", and "the Chimpanzee Drama".

== History ==
At around 12 p.m. on Wednesday, 14 December 2022, two chimpanzees of Furuvik Zoo escaped from their enclosure through an unlocked lattice door and entered the chimpanzee building. An animal keeper attempted to fight one off, but soon fled and warned other employees by yelling and using their radio. Within five minutes, at least two chimps had escaped the building and entered the wider zoo, which was closed to the public for the winter season.

Forty-five minutes later, two chimps were discovered at the park's fairground area. After consulting veterinarians, and excluding the use of anesthesia due to risks involved, the park's CEO and animal manager made the joint decision to shoot the two chimps. Zoo staff opened fire on them using live ammunition, killing Linda and her adoptive infant son Torsten. Later in the afternoon, three chimps escaped the chimpanzee building. Zoo staff again opened fire, wounding Selma, who retreated inside. Manda and Santino repeatedly entered and exited the building through the windows. Fearing a possible return into the now-dark park, the decision was made to shoot them as well. Santino was killed quickly, whilst Manda was mortally wounded. An unknown time after the shootings, Manda died of her gunshot wounds, while Selma sustained severe injuries to her eye, body, and arm. The remaining two chimpanzees (Maria Magdalena and Tjobbe) remained inside the building. The decision to use lethal force rather than to attempt to use tranquilizers or otherwise recapture the apes resulted in widespread criticism.

Following the deaths of the four chimpanzees, the Swedish Police Authority announce that they had opened an investigation against Furuvik Zoo for possible crimes against the Animal Welfare Act, and the County Administration of Gävleborg County announced that they would make inquiries into conditions at the zoo.

== List of chimpanzees involved ==
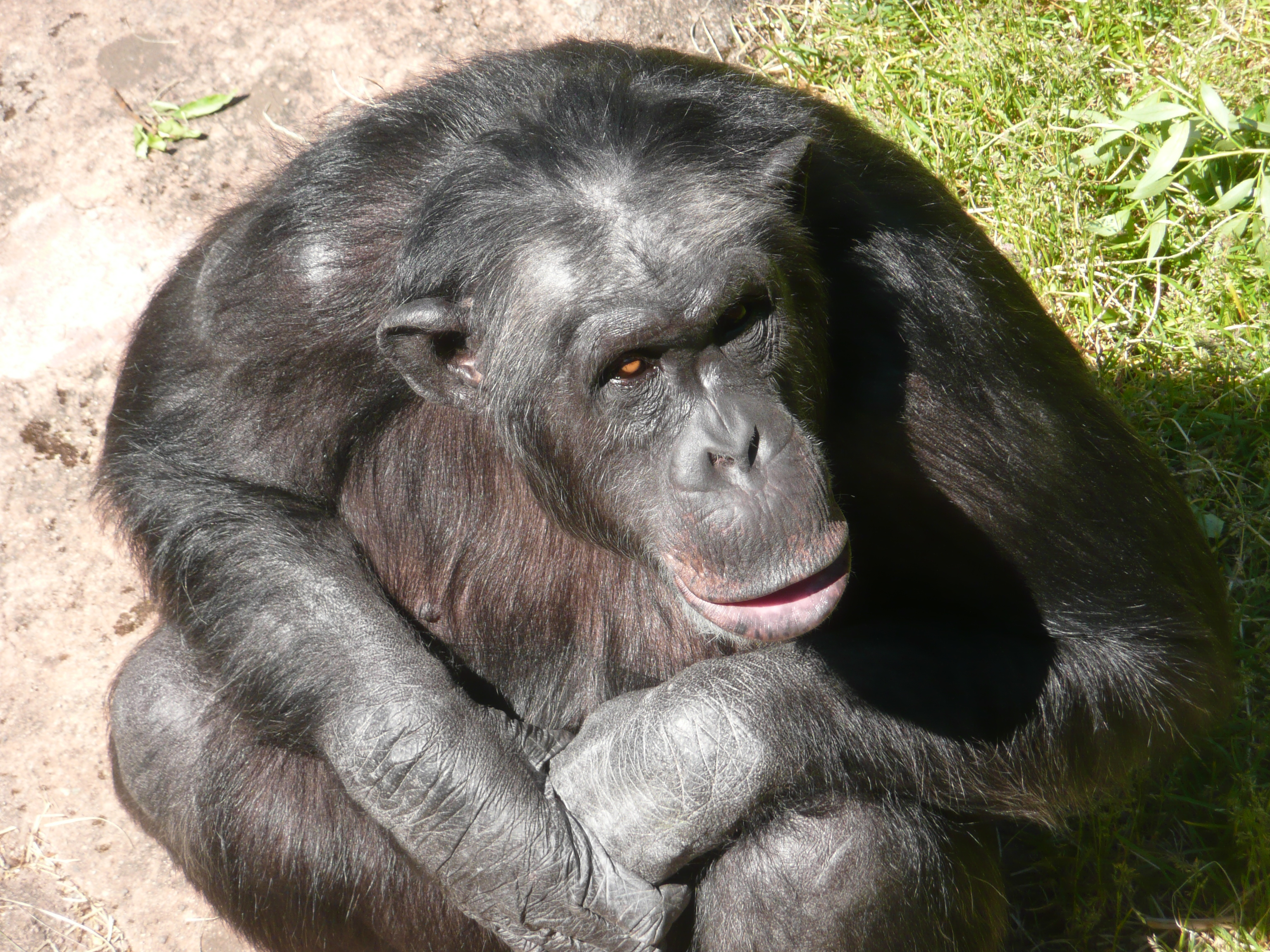
Santino in 2012

=== Killed chimpanzees ===
- Santino (born 1978), a male chimpanzee born in captivity at Hellabrunn Zoo in Munich, Germany. He was well known for his proclivity for painting; his paintings, both copies and originals, were previously sold by the zoo for the benefit of the Swedish Chimpanzee Trust. Owners of Santino's paintings include Crown Princess Victoria of Sweden and Princess Madeleine of Sweden. He has been described as "Crown Princess Victoria's favorite chimp". In 2009 Santino gained attention from both news media and scientists when it became known that he had learned to stockpile stone ammunition in anticipation of throwing them at zoo visitors, behaviour which cognitive zoologists suggested indicated that planning and premeditated deception are not uniquely human traits. He was castrated after this incident in an attempt to control his hormone levels and regulate his behaviour. Santino was shot and killed inside the chimpanzee house.
- Linda (born c. 1980), a female chimpanzee born in the wild in Liberia and rescued after poachers killed her family. Linda was a Western chimpanzee (Pan troglodytes verus), a critically endangered West African subspecies of the common chimpanzee. According to the European Association of Zoos and Aquaria, Linda's death would not impact Western chimpanzee conservation efforts. Linda was shot and killed in the park's fairground.
- Manda (born 2004), a female chimpanzee born in captivity at Kolmården Wildlife Park and transferred to Furuvik Zoo after she was orphaned as an infant. She became well known in Sweden after becoming the focus of the television show Schimpansen Manda , featured in the Bolibompa children's television series soon after the move to Furuvik. Manda was shot and mortally wounded inside the chimpanzee house.
- Torsten (born 2019), a male chimpanzee infant born in captivity at Furuvik Zoo, the first born there in 25 years. His parents were Maria Magdalena and Tjobbe, but Linda was seen as his adoptive mother. Torsten was shot and killed in the park's fairground.

=== Surviving chimpanzees ===
- Selma (born 2008), a female chimpanzee born in captivity at Kolmården Wildlife Park and transferred to Furuvik Zoo after her mother rejected her. In 2009 she met with King Carl XVI Gustaf and Queen Silvia of Sweden during a royal visit to the zoo. Selma was shot and severely injured outside the chimpanzee house during the incident and suffered damage causing blindness in one eye, embedded shrapnel in her body, and a fracture of one arm, temporarily losing control of it.
- Maria Magdalena (born 2000), a female chimpanzee born in captivity at Borås Zoo and transferred to Furuvik Zoo in 2005. She was the biological mother of Torsten (born 2019).
- Tjobbe (born 2003), a male chimpanzee born in captivity at Royal Burgers' Zoo in Arnhem, Netherlands. He was transferred from Kittenberger Kálmán Zoo & Botanical Garden in Veszprém, Hungary, to Furuvik Zoo in 2015. He was the father of Torsten (born 2019).

== Reactions ==
The chimpanzee shootings provoked intense media coverage and debate, both domestically in Sweden and abroad. Several political figures commented, including the Green Party politicians Märta Stenevi and Rebecka Le Moine who questioned the state of animal captivity in Sweden, the Sweden Democratic politician Yasmine Eriksson who called for a review of all Swedish zoos, and the Christian Democratic politician Peter Kullgren, Minister for Rural Affairs, who expressed sadness but refrained from commenting on ongoing investigations. Numerous Swedish celebrities and public figures also expressed sadness or condemnation, including Johanna Lind, Jessica Almenäs, Uno Svenningsson, Micael Bindefeld, Thomas Di Leva, Lars-Åke Wilhelmsson, and Linda Lindorff.

The chimpanzee shootings also prompted many reactions from biologists and conservationists. When interviewed about the incident, the noted Dutch primatologist Frans de Waal expressed shock that the 3-year old chimpanzee infant Torsten was among those killed by the zoo, as such a young ape did not pose any physical danger to humans. The Dutch behavioural biologist Patrick van Veen, chair of the Jane Goodall Institute commented on the incident that recapture by non-lethal means, such as tranquilizers, should always be the first priority during chimpanzee escapes, and that lethal force should only be used in the worst-case scenario. The Swedish cognitive zoologist Mathias Osvath, who has spent years researching the chimpanzees at Furuvik Zoo, expressed sorrow over the incident and concern for the trauma experienced by the chimpanzee survivors, further announcing the immediate suspension of the Primate Research Station Furuvik, a joint research programme between the Cognitive Zoology Group of Lund University and Furuvik Zoo.

Camilla Bergvall, chair of the Swedish animal rights organization Djurens Rätt, condemned the actions of Furuvik Zoo and the wider keeping of animals in captivity in Sweden. On the other hand, the zookeeper Jonas Wahlström, director of the Skansen Aquarium, defended the zoological parks of Sweden as necessary and positive forces in society.

== See also ==
- Harambe
- Kolmården Wildlife Park
