= Gröna Lund =

Amusement park in Stockholm, Sweden

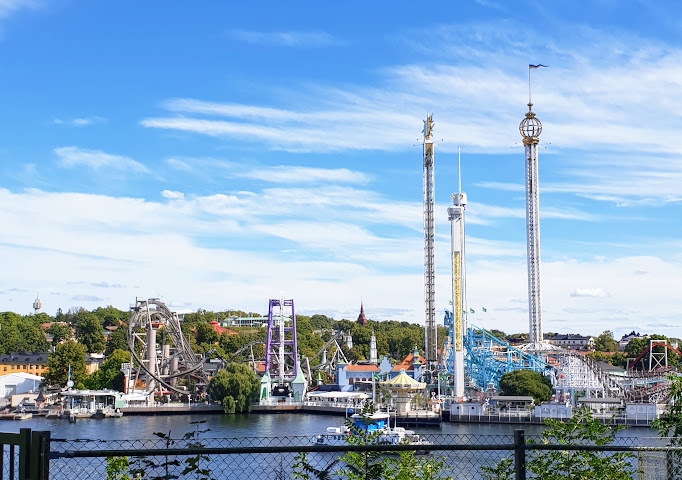
- Gröna Lund in 2022
- Interactive map of Gröna Lund
- Location: Djurgården, Stockholm, Sweden
- Coordinates: 59°19′24″N 18°05′48″E
- Status: Operating
- Opened: August 3, 1883; 142 years ago
- Owner: Parks & Resorts Scandinavia AB
- Operated by: Gröna Lunds Tivoli AB
- Attendance: 1,676,000 (2019)
- Area: 3.8 ha (9.4 acres)

Attractions
- Total: 30
- Roller coasters: 7
- Website: www.gronalund.com

Gröna Lund (Swedish: [ˈɡrø̂ːna ˈlɵnːd, ɡrøːnaˈlɵnːd], lit. 'Green Grove'), or colloquially Grönan (Swedish: [ˈɡrø̂ːnan]), is an amusement park in Stockholm, Sweden. Located on the seaward side of Djurgården, it is 3.8 ha (9.4 acres) in size, relatively small compared to other amusement parks, mainly because of its central location, which limits expansion. The park has over 30 attractions and is a popular venue for concerts in the summer with its three event venues. It was founded in 1883 by Jacob Schultheis and is the first and oldest amusement park in the country.

== History ==
The area has been used for amusement purposes since the early 18th century. In 1883, a German man by the name of Jacob Schultheis rented the area to erect "carousels and other amusements", at which point it became known as Gröna Lund. Until 2001, descendants of Schultheis owned Gröna Lund. Since 2006, the park has been owned by Parks & Resorts Scandinavia AB, which also owns Kolmården Wildlife Park and Skara Sommarland.

Gröna Lund features several attractions, including a tunnel of love, a funhouse, and seven roller coasters. It is also known for the various concerts held on the park grounds. It has notably hosted ABBA in 1973, Bob Marley in 1980, "Weird Al" Yankovic in 2015, and Dua Lipa and My Chemical Romance in 2022.

=== Incident ===
On 25 June 2023, one person was killed and nine others were injured after Jetline partially derailed. The park was temporarily closed after the incident. On 3 July 2023 the park reopened without any rides operating. On 5 July 2023, all rides except Jetline reopened. Jetline remained closed as it underwent an investigation by the Swedish Accident Investigation Authority, which concluded on 14 June 2024, when it was announced that an improperly manufactured replacement control arm was to blame for the accident, and that Jetline would be removed. On 28 January 2026, Gröna Lund was sentenced by the Stockholm District Court and fined kr 5,200,000.

== Rides ==
=== Rides under construction ===
Name	Type	Expected opening year	Manufacturer	Notes
Vildare Musen	Steel roller coaster	2027	Gerstlauer	Reaches a speed of 55 km/h (34 mph) on a 430 metres (1,410 ft) track with a height of 21 metres (69 ft). Known as "Vilda Musen" from its original 2003 opening to 2025. Was heavily intertwined with Jetline and had to be temporarily dismantled in order to allow for the latter's removal.
Fenix	Steel roller coaster	2027	Gerstlauer	

=== Roller coasters ===
Name	Type	Opening year	Manufacturer	Notes
Nyckelpigan	Steel	1976	Zierer	Reaches a speed of 28 km/h (17 mph) on a 60 metres (200 ft) track with a height of 3 metres (9.8 ft).
Vildare Musen	Steel	2003	Gerstlauer	Reaches a speed of 55 km/h (34 mph) on a 430 metres (1,410 ft) track with a height of 21 metres (69 ft). Known as "Vilda Musen" from 2003 to 2025. Dismantled in 2025 to make way for the removal of Jetline, and expected to reopen in 2027.
Kvasten	Steel, inverted	2007	Vekoma	Reaches a speed of 55 km/h (34 mph) on a 400 metres (1,300 ft) track with a height of 20 metres (66 ft).
Insane	Steel, fourth-dimension, wing (ZacSpin)	2009	Intamin	Reaches a speed of 60 km/h on a 250 metres (820 ft) track with a height of 35 metres (115 ft).
Tuff-Tuff Tåget	Steel (wild mouse)	2010	Zamperla	Reaches a speed of 8 km/h (5.0 mph) on an 80 metres (260 ft) track with a height of 3 metres (9.8 ft).
Twister	Wooden (hybrid)	2011	The Gravity Group	Reaches a speed of 61 km/h (38 mph) on a 480 metres (1,570 ft) track with a height of 15 metres (49 ft).
Monster	Steel, inverted	2021	Bolliger & Mabillard	Reaches a speed of 90 km/h (56 mph) on a 700 metres (2,300 ft) track with a height of 34 metres (112 ft). Contains four inversions.

=== Flat rides ===
Name	Type	Opening year	Manufacturer
Blue Train	Dark ride	1935	Magnus Sörman, Gosetto
Kärlekstunneln	Old Mill	Unknown	Unknown
Barnradiobilarna	Bumper cars	1968	Reverchon Industries
Flying Carpet	Ali Baba	1983	Zierer
Pop Expressen	Breakdance	1996	HUSS Park Attractions
Chain Flyer	Wave swinger	1997	Zierer
Fritt Fall Tilt	Drop tower	1998	Intamin
Octopus	Spinning ride	2000	Anton Schwarzkopf
Katapulten	Launch tower	2001	S&S Worldwide
Lantern	Spinning tower ride	2008	Zierer
Eclipse	Swing ride	2013	Funtime
House of Nightmares	Dark ride	2015	Sally Corporation
Ikaros	Drop tower	2017	Intamin

=== Kiddie rides ===
Name	Type	Opening year	Manufacturer
Circus Carousel	Merry-go-round	1883	Unknown
Fun House	Funhouse	1883	Partially built in-house, renovations by Zierer
Tunnel of Love	Tunnel of love	1917	Built in-house
Mirror House	Mirror maze	1935	Unknown
Flying Elephants	Spinning ride	1983	Zamperla
Little Paris Wheel	Miniature Ferris wheel	1993	Zamperla
Mini Bumper Cars	Miniature bumper cars	2003	Bertazzon
Pettson and Findus World	Walkthrough play area	2003	Built in-house
Kuling	Rockin' Tug	2005	Zamperla
Tea Cups	Teacups	2008	Mack Rides
Veteran Cars	Car ride	Unknown	Unknown

=== Former rides ===
Name	Type	Year opened	Year closed	Manufacturer	Notes
Bergbana	Wooden side-friction roller coaster	1931	1965	Unknown	Originally operated in 1930 at the Stockholm Exhibition as "Berg och dalbanan".
Bobsleighbanan	Wooden side-frictionroller coaster	1934	1934	Unknown	Portable coaster that only stayed at the park for one season.
Extreme	Top Scan	1999	2012	Mondial	Moved to Furuvik Zoo where it operated as "Hurucan" until it was removed in 2024.
Radar	Steel roller coaster	1965	1981	Schwarzkopf	Relocated to Ölands Djur & Nöjespark as Jumbo Jet, where it operated from 1981 to 2008.
Blauer Enzian	Steel children's roller coaster	1980	1982	Mack Rides	
Jet Star II	Steel Jet Star roller coaster	1982	1983	Schwarzkopf	
Jetline	Steel roller coaster	1988	2023	Zierer, Schwarzkopf	Known as "Berg- och Dalbanan" from 2002 to 2003. Removed after an incident which resulted in a death and several injuries.
Thriller	Steel roller coaster	1996	1996	Schwarzkopf	Has since been relocated to Six Flags AstroWorld, Six Flags Discovery Kingdom, and Isla San Marcos Parque Temático, where it operated until 2014 before closing for good.
Snake	Pendulum ride	2019	2020	Funtime	Moved to Skara Sommarland.

== Gallery ==
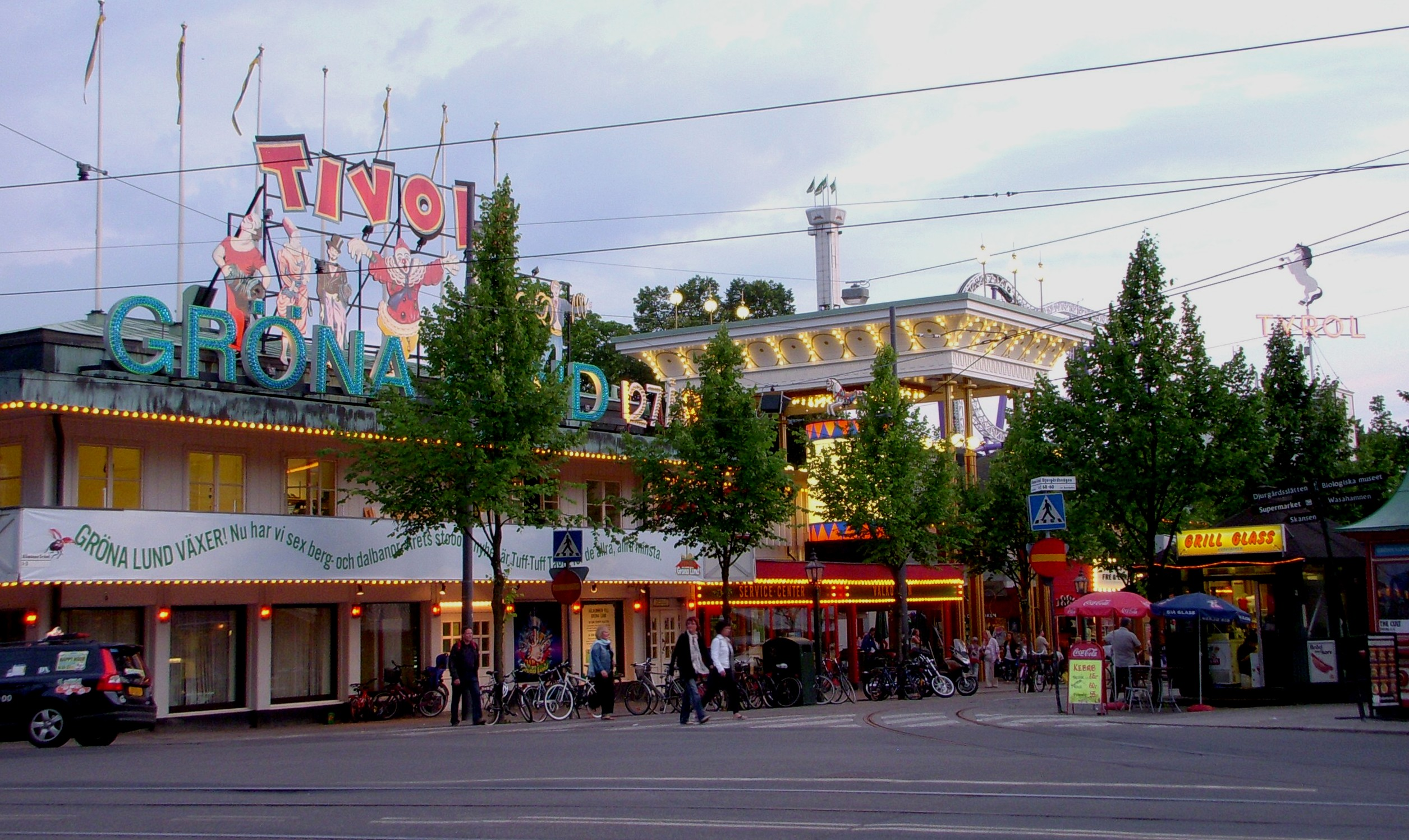
The park's main entrance in 2010

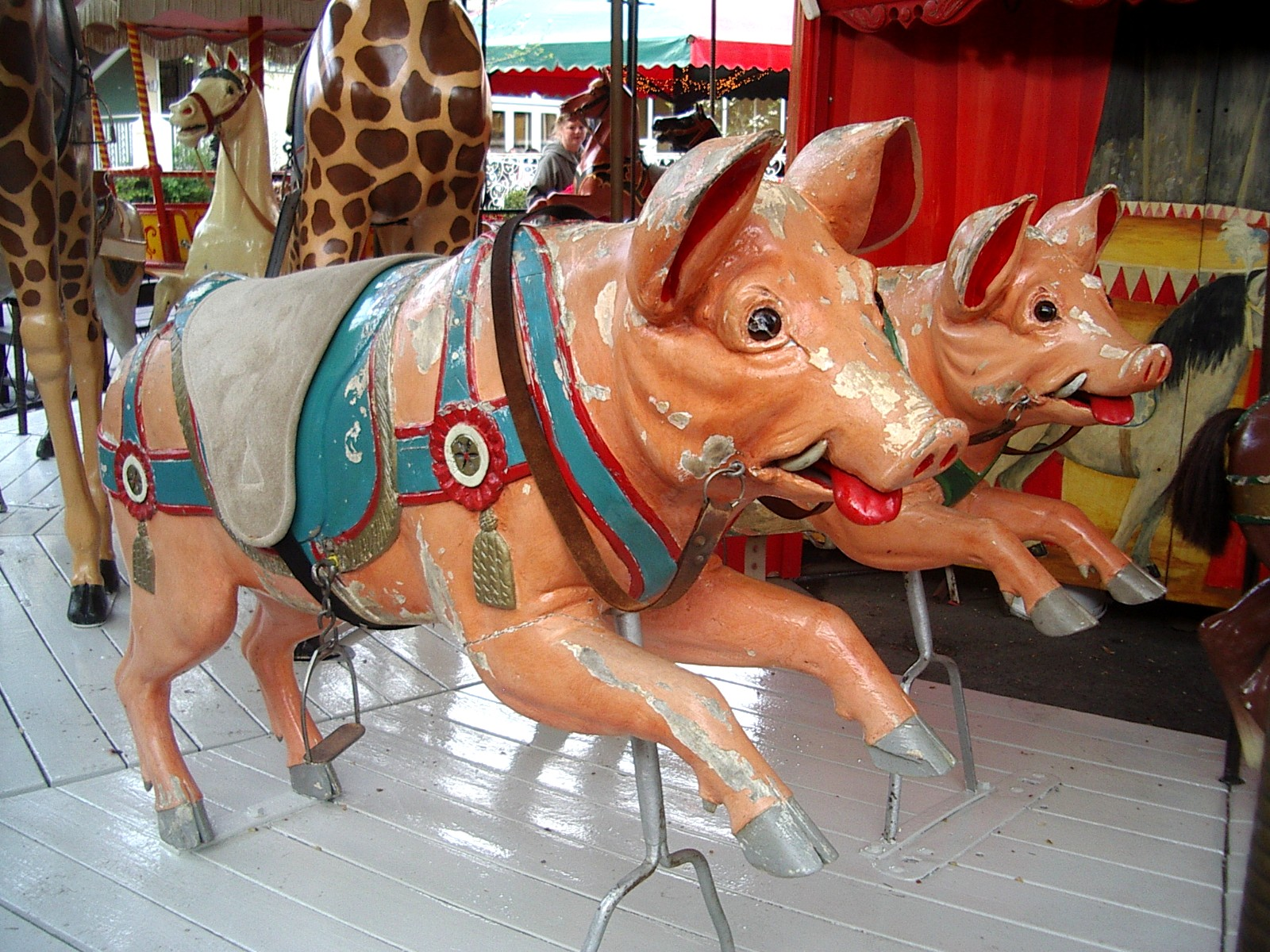
Handmade carousel pigs from the 19th century

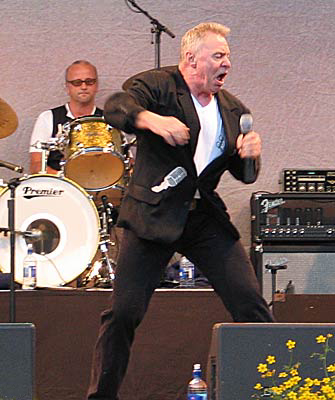
Jerry Williams performing in 2004

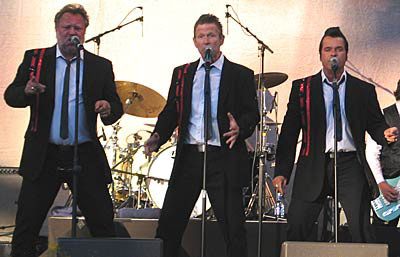
The Boppers performing in 2004

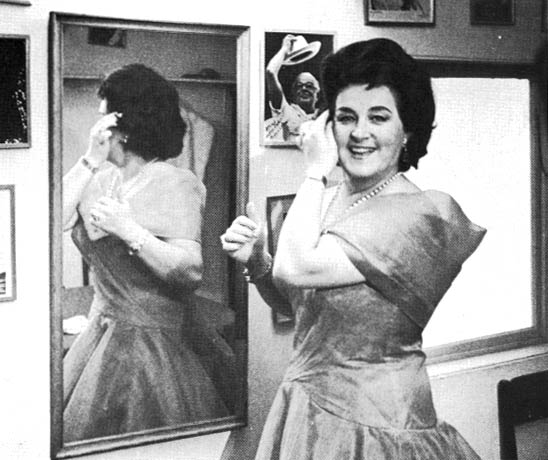
Birgit Nilsson backstage in the 1960s

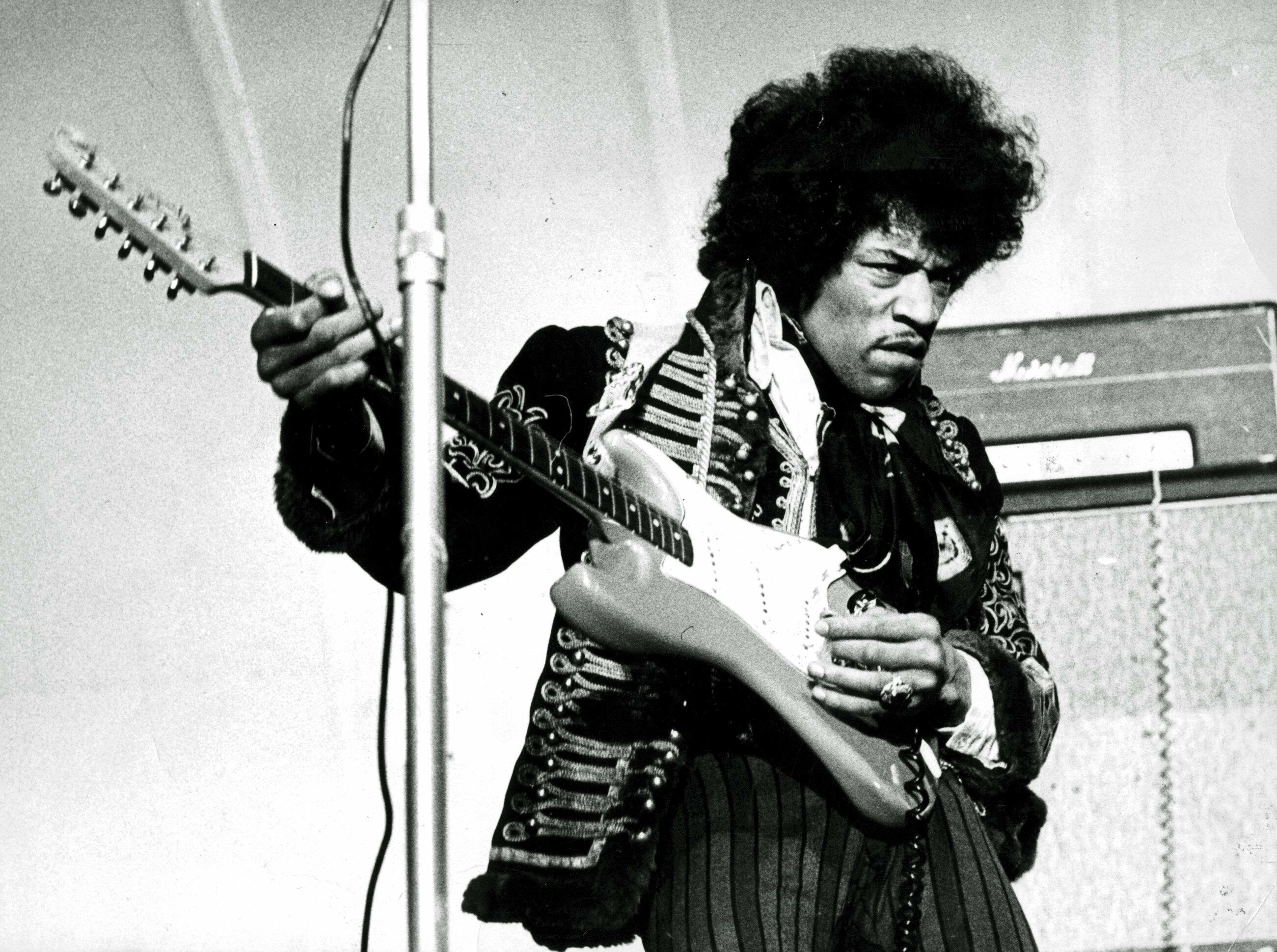
Jimi Hendrix performing in 1967

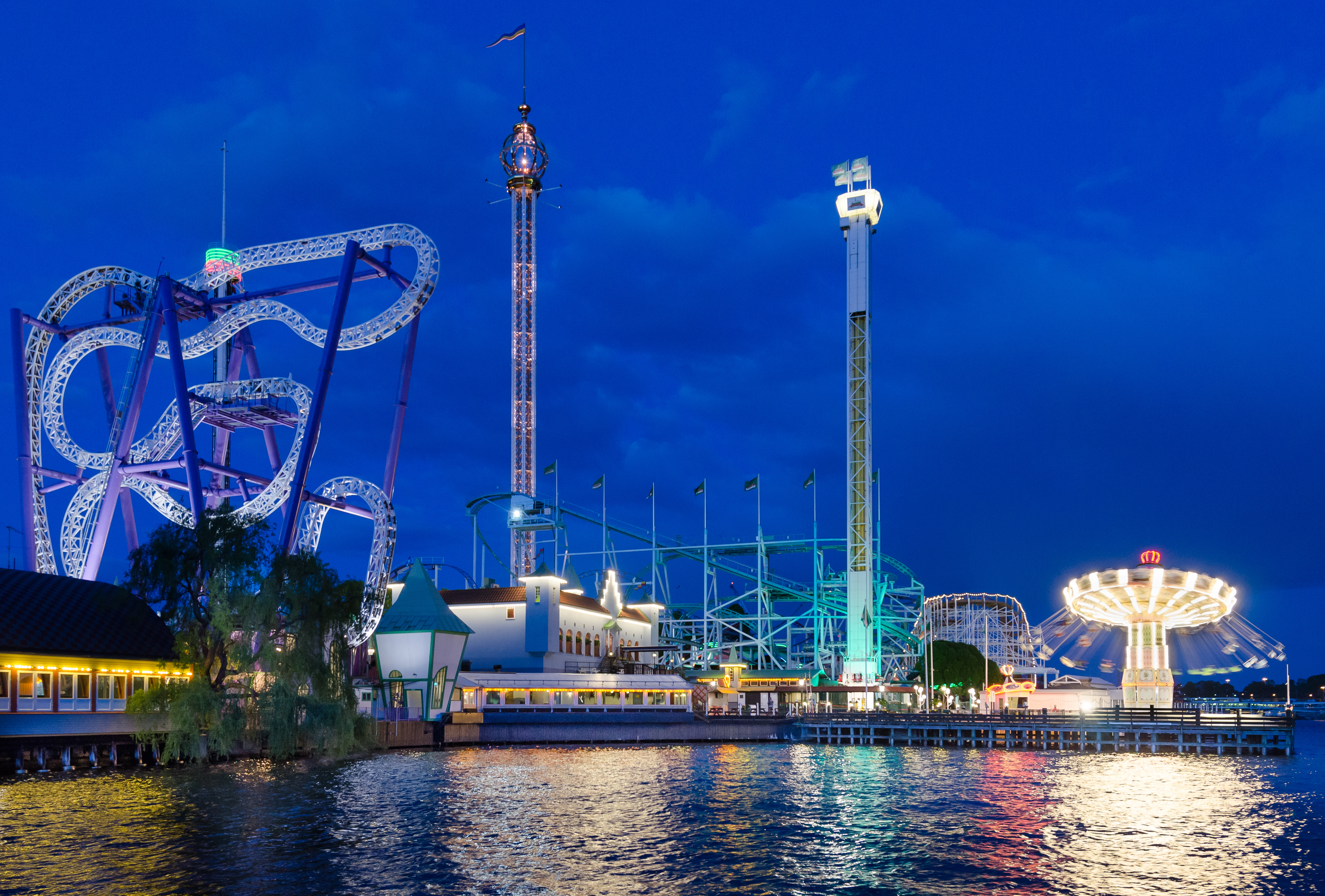
Night view in 2015

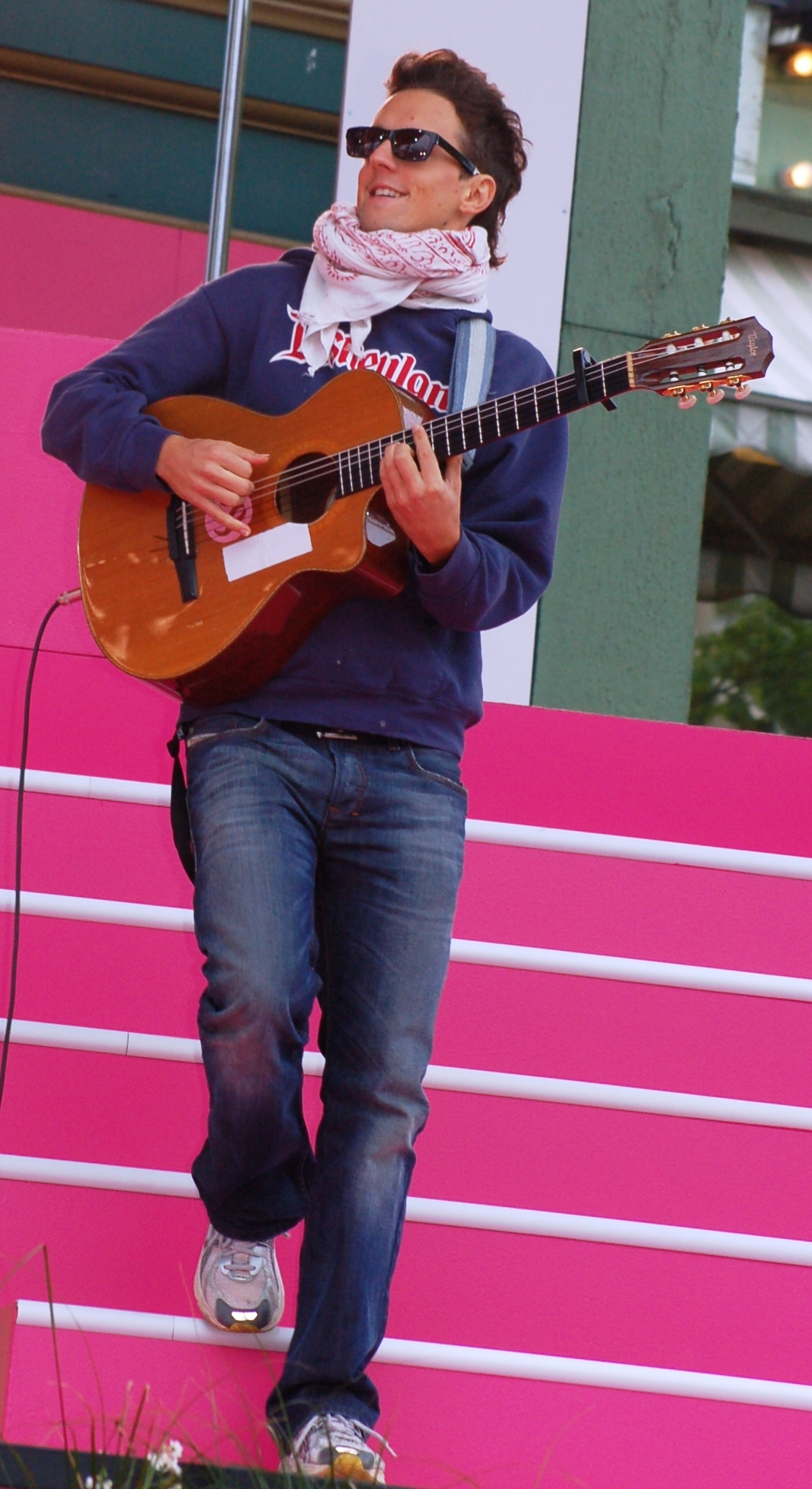
Jason Mraz performing in 2008

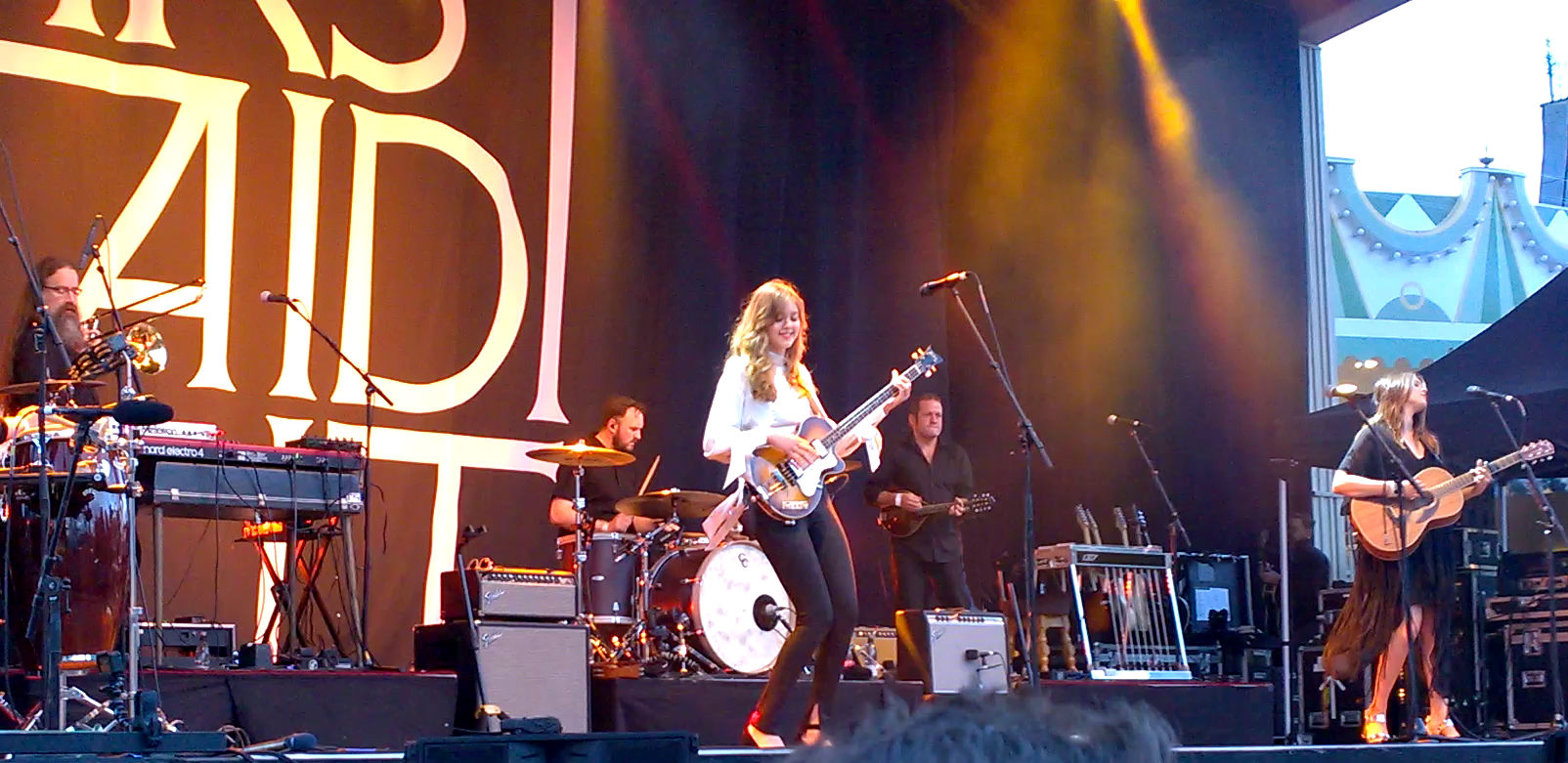
First Aid Kit performing in 2017

== See also ==
- Liseberg
- Skansen
- Djurgårdslinjen
