= 2023 Jetline roller coaster accident =

Incident at Gröna Lund in Stockholm

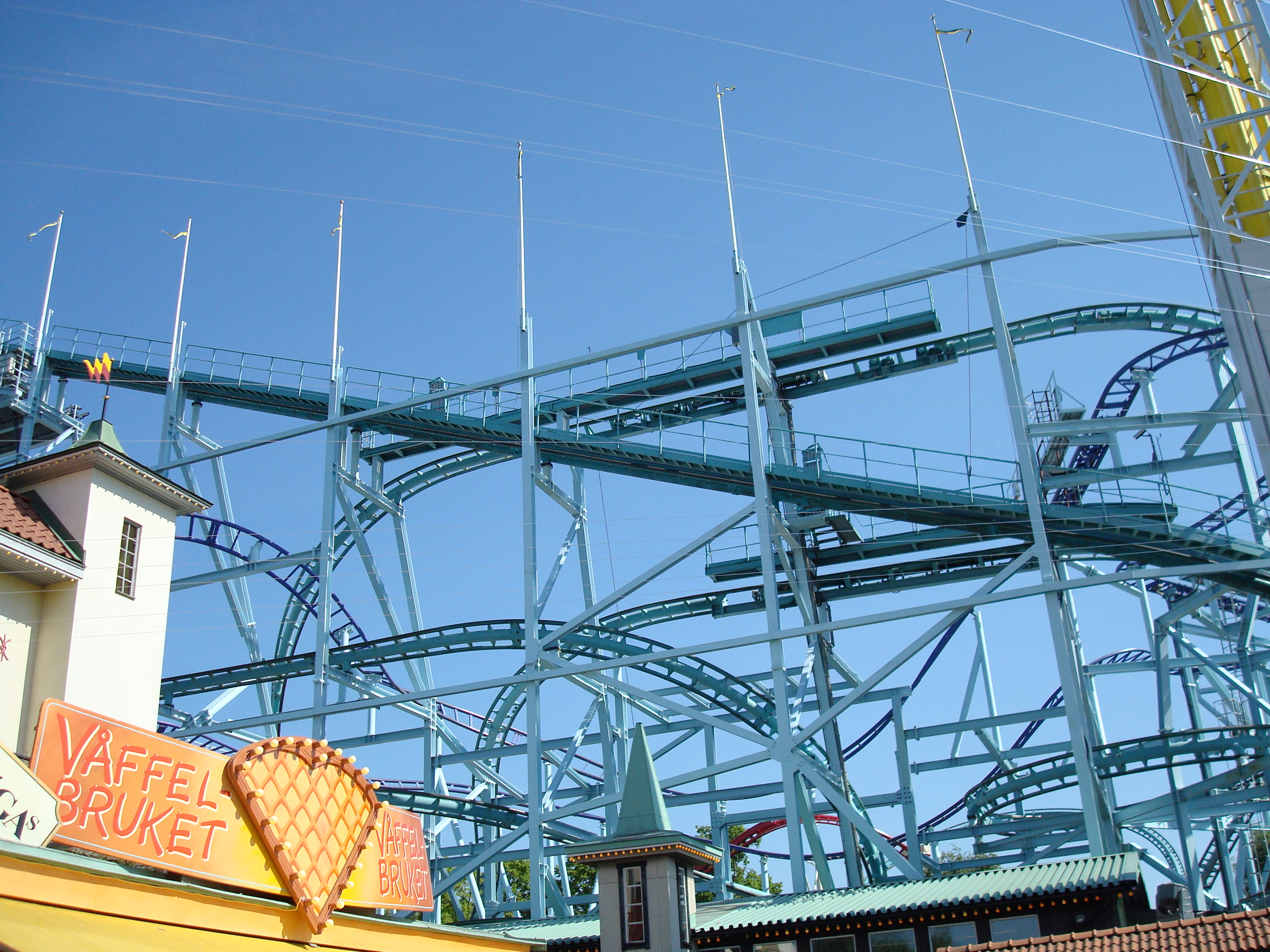
- Jetline in 2007
- Date: 25 June 2023
- Location: Gröna Lund, Stockholm, Sweden
- Type: Roller coaster derailment
- Cause: Improperly manufactured replacement parts
- Participants: 14
- Outcome: Ride permanently closed (2023); Park closed for a week (2023); Park operator fined (2026)
- Deaths: 1
- Injuries: 9

Jetline was a steel roller coaster at Gröna Lund in Stockholm, Sweden, made by the now-defunct German manufacturer Schwarzkopf. It operated from 23 April 1988 until 25 June 2023, when a fatal accident during operation led to its permanent closure and eventual demolition.

On 25 June 2023, at 11:36 am, a train carrying eleven riders partially derailed after a portion of the train's forward truck failed and detached from the car body. The car then struck multiple track joints before eventually stopping. The sudden deceleration threw passengers against their lap bars with such force that several of the bars bent and three riders were ejected from the train. One person was killed and nine were injured. Emergency services arrived within minutes, and had rescued all surviving riders within an hour.

An investigation by the Swedish Accident Investigation Authority (SHK) concluded that a replacement part, ordered by Gröna Lund in 2019 from a subcontractor that lacked certification, was manufactured with weld defects reducing its strength. When the accident occurred, forces during ride operation exceeded what the weakened part could withstand, causing it to break, come loose, and strike the track. SHK identified systemic deficiencies at the park in overseeing the manufacture of parts.

Following the accident, Jetline was permanently closed and later demolished. In November 2025, Gröna Lund and two subcontractors went on trial over the accident. In January 2026, Gröna Lund was convicted and fined kr 5,200,000.

== Background ==
Jetline was a steel roller coaster at Gröna Lund in Stockholm, Sweden. Jetline was designed by Schwarzkopf and Ingenieurbüro Stengel GmbH (both defunct). The trains were manufactured by Zierer and the track by Bayrische Hütten Stahl (also defunct). It operated from 23 April 1988 to 25 June 2023.

== Incident ==
On 25 June 2023, at 11:36 a.m., train E, carrying eleven riders, derailed near the third rise. The control arm (a metal device used to attach the wheel assemblies to the train) on the front of the train failed and became detached, resulting in the underside of the carriage striking the track joints at several points. After travelling approximately one-third of the length of the track, the train came to a sudden stop. This caused the eleven passengers to be thrown against their lap bars, some of which bent under the load to such an extent that three passengers were ejected from the ride, one of whom was killed. In total, nine riders were injured.

== Incident response ==
Jetline's ride operators witnessed the incident from the ride's station and immediately called Gröna Lund's maintenance team. Several technicians responded to the roller coaster. Visitors to Gröna Lund had also seen the incident, and some entered the restricted area to assist before emergency personnel arrived.

The first emergency call was placed at 11:38 a.m. and responders were dispatched. Elements of the Greater Stockholm Fire Brigade first arrived at 11:45. The rescue operation began immediately. The incident commander ordered the park to be evacuated, and Gröna Lund staff completed the evacuation ten minutes later.

Upon obtaining a ladder truck, rescue personnel attempted to reach a person who was stuck on a support beam. After the rider was brought down, the truck was moved again to reach the passengers in the train. Technicians secured the train to the track and assisted firefighters in opening the lap bars to release passengers. Medical personnel received injured riders after they were brought down from the ladder.

After resuscitation efforts, one of the ejected riders was pronounced dead at the scene. Another was treated on site before being taken by ambulance to a hospital. All passengers were evacuated from the train just over an hour after the incident.

Passengers in the other two trains that were running that day were evacuated by Gröna Lund staff and safely exited the ride. The rescue operation concluded at 2:52 p.m. The Swedish Police Authority closed off the area and prohibited operations of the ride on 30 June 2023.

== Investigation ==
The accident was investigated by the Swedish Accident Investigation Authority (SHK) with assistance from Elements Materials Technology AB and the KTH Royal Institute of Technology. The investigation began on 26 June 2023. On 14 June 2024, SHK published the accident report, concluding the investigation.

=== Procurement and production of replacement front control arms ===
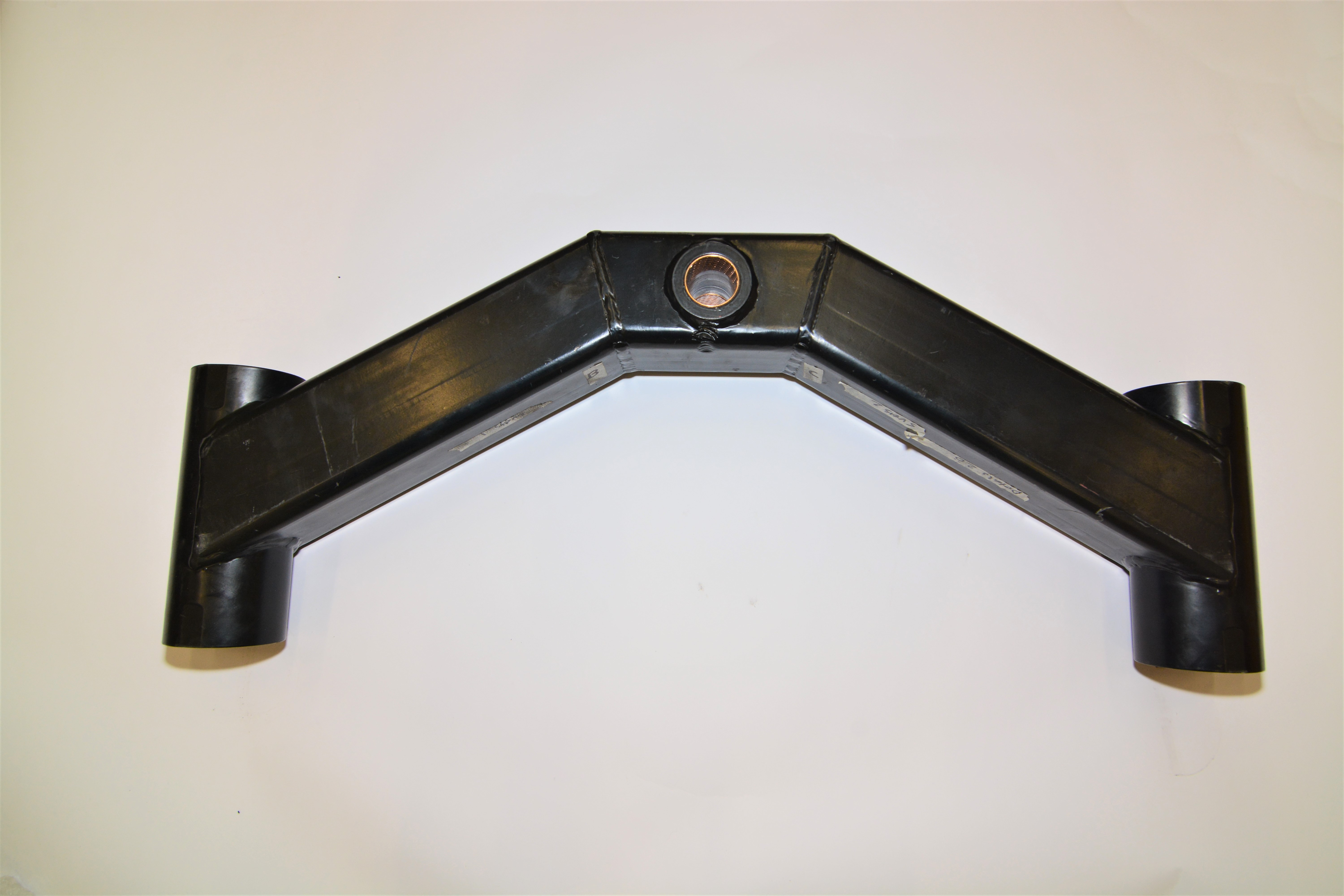
A control arm from a Jetline train

During the annual teardown of train B in October 2019, cracks were discovered in its front control arm. The control arm was considered too worn to repair, so the front control arms on all trains were replaced.

Gröna Lund placed an order for 5 control arms with Mekosmos AB, providing copies of the original drawings. The park expected the welds to undergo magnetic particle inspection, but did not specify any additional requirements for making the parts. Mekosmos subcontracted the welding to Göteborgs Mekaniska Werkstad AB (GMW) without informing Gröna Lund. GMW purchased the materials needed and performed fabrication and internal checks. According to the welder, there was uncertainty about whether a backing bar (a piece of metal to be welded at a joint to strengthen the control arm) was required. The question was referred to the employee managing the order at GMW, who determined that no backing bar was needed. No further verification of this interpretation was carried out. The welder did not hold a valid qualification certificate to EN ISO 9696-1 standards, although he had extensive practical experience.

The five front control arms were completed in January 2020 and sent for magnetic particle inspection, which did not detect any defects. They were delivered to Gröna Lund in early spring of 2020. One of the arms was found to have been damaged during manufacturing and was set aside for scrapping, though it remained in storage. The others were installed on the trains. SHK concluded that the control arm that failed during the accident was one of the components manufactured from this order.

=== Cause of the derailment ===
SHK determined that the component that failed was a front control arm manufactured as part of the replacement order. The arm differed from the original design by Schwarzkopf because it had been welded without a backing bar. Additionally, several of its welds contained significant defects. These deficiencies resulted in substantially reduced strength.

During the ride cycle in question, physical forces were greater than the weakened arm could withstand, causing welds to fail and the control arm to fracture. This failure led to the partial derailment of the front car, initiating the sequence of events that caused the fatal accident.

=== Cause of the ejection and injuries of the riders ===
The lap bars were designed to meet the standards in place when they were built, and they were found to have no defects. When passengers were thrown forward, they put forces on the lap bars that the bars were not designed to withstand. This caused the lap bars to bend, some of which bent enough to be entirely open. Only one lap bar did not bend at all. The lap bars being bent out of their locked position caused three riders to be ejected from the train. Testing showed that the restraints secured riders properly during normal operations and emergency stops.

== Aftermath ==
On 14 June 2024, Gröna Lund announced that Jetline would close permanently. The ride was later demolished.

The accident prompted discussion about the challenges of manufacturing replacement components for rides whose original manufacturers no longer exist. SHK's findings identified deficiencies in ordering, documentation, subcontracting oversight, and quality assurance. As a result of this accident, the International Association of Amusement Parks and Attractions (IAAPA) did a case study of the incident that almost 100 members attended. IAAPA stated that the case study informed efforts to improve standards for replacement parts on rides from defunct manufacturers.

After the incident, Gröna Lund introduced several changes, including a new plan for checking replacement part orders, revised ordering and installation procedures, and stricter checks on suppliers. Gröna Lund also implemented new documentation procedures.

=== SHK's safety recommendations ===
Following the investigation, SHK issued a series of safety recommendations in its final report to four organizations.

- Gröna Lund was recommended to improve its approach to attraction safety, including more rigorous and ongoing risk identification, writing procedures for ensuring replacement parts comply with original attraction requirements, and regularly review and update safety procedures.
- The Swedish Police Authority was recommended to review amusement ride regulations, including operator responsibilities, safety requirements, inspection standards, and record-keeping.
- The Swedish government was recommended to strengthen public oversight of amusement parks and fairs through ongoing oversight, supervisory visits, and improved guidance to operators on compliance.
- The International Association of Amusement Parks and Attractions (IAAPA) was recommended to share the final report with its members so they could consider whether restraint requirements for other rides should be changed.

=== Criminal case ===
After the incident, police opened a criminal investigation into the accident on suspicion of "involuntary manslaughter", "causing bodily harm and danger to others".

In early November 2025, the criminal trial began against Gröna Lund, Mekosmos AB, and the now-defunct GMW. The companies were charged with "gross negligence causing death", "gross negligence causing bodily harm", and "causing danger to others". Prosecutors sought kr 12,000,000 from Gröna Lund and kr 3,000,000 from each subcontractor.

On 28 January 2026, Gröna Lund was sentenced by the Stockholm District Court and fined kr 5,200,000. GMW was fined kr 1,300,000, while Mekosmos was acquitted. The court found that, in ordering the new control arms, Gröna Lund was negligent by providing insufficient documentation and not verifying that the work was carried out by a qualified welder. There were 11 plaintiffs in the case who claimed damages, totaling kr 2,200,000, ranging from kr 50,000 to kr 584,000 per person. The court denied compensation because it ruled that the defendants were not grossly negligent. Two of the ejected riders, Karin and Mikael Elmegard, criticized the court's ruling for declining to award compensation to the victims.

=== Investigation into Swedish amusement ride regulation ===
Following the accident, alongside others of a similar nature in Sweden, the Swedish government issued Directive 2024:75 on 29 August 2024. The directive ordered that a special investigator be appointed to consider measures to strengthen the supervision of amusement rides, and questioned whether responsibility for the oversight of amusement rides should be transferred from the Swedish Police Authority to another agency. In April 2025, the report Säkrare tivoli (Swedish for 'Safer amusement parks') was submitted to the Minister of Justice. The earliest the proposed changes could come into effect is 1 January 2027.
