= Vildare Musen =

Roller coaster at Gröna Lund

Vilda Musen
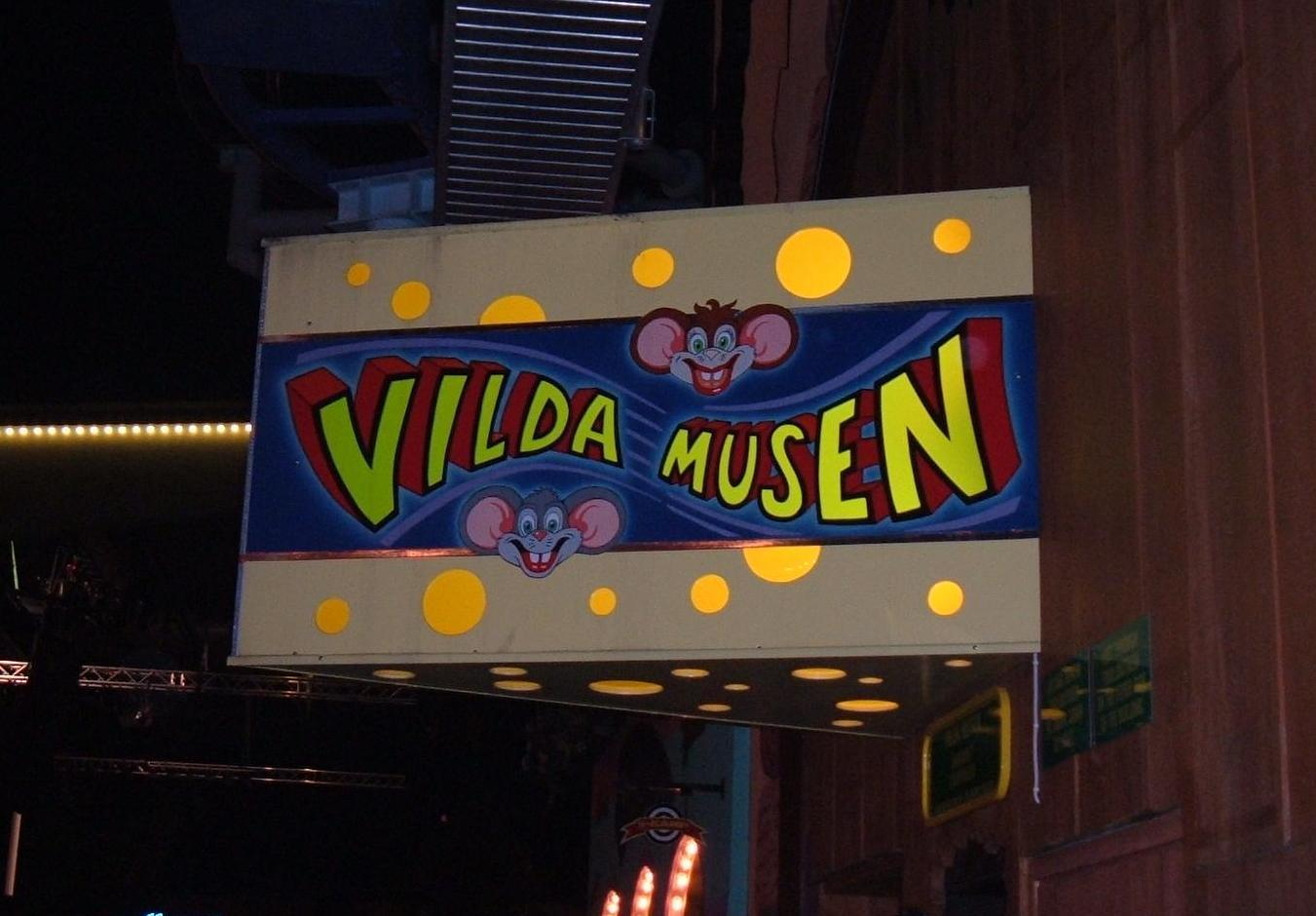

Gröna Lund
- Location: Gröna Lund
- Coordinates: 59°19′23″N 18°05′44″E
- Status: Closed
- Opening date: 18 April 2003

General statistics
- Type: Steel
- Manufacturer: Gerstlauer
- Designer: Werner Stengel, Wendelin Stückl
- Model: Bobsled Coaster (Custom)
- Height: 68.11 ft (20.76 m)
- Length: 1,410.9 ft (430.0 m)
- Speed: 34.2 mph (55.0 km/h)
- Inversions: 0
- Duration: 1:34
- Max vertical angle: 40°
- Capacity: 800 riders per hour
- Website: Official site
- Vilda Musen at RCDB

Vildare Musen ("Wilder Mouse") is a steel roller coaster at Gröna Lund in Stockholm, Sweden. It is 20.76 metres (68.11 ft) tall, 430 metres (1,410.9 ft) long, and reaches top speeds of 55 km/h (34.2 mph). The ride was built by Gerstlauer.

== History ==
The ride initially opened on 18 April 2003 as Vilda Musen ("Wild Mouse"). It operated under that name until 2025, when it had to be temporarily dismantled to allow for the removal of the nearby Jetline coaster, as the two rides were intertwined. It is slated to reopen in 2027 as Vildare Musen in a new location with several redesigned portions. It will share a support structure with another new coaster called Fenix.

=== Incidents ===
- In 2019, the coaster had to be evacuated after one of the cars stopped moving. It was later found that a hat had fallen on the tracks, forcing the ride to stop.
- In 2022, the ride became unexpectedly stopped once again, and four passengers were escorted to safety.
