= Monster (Gröna Lund) =

Inverted roller coaster at Gröna Lund

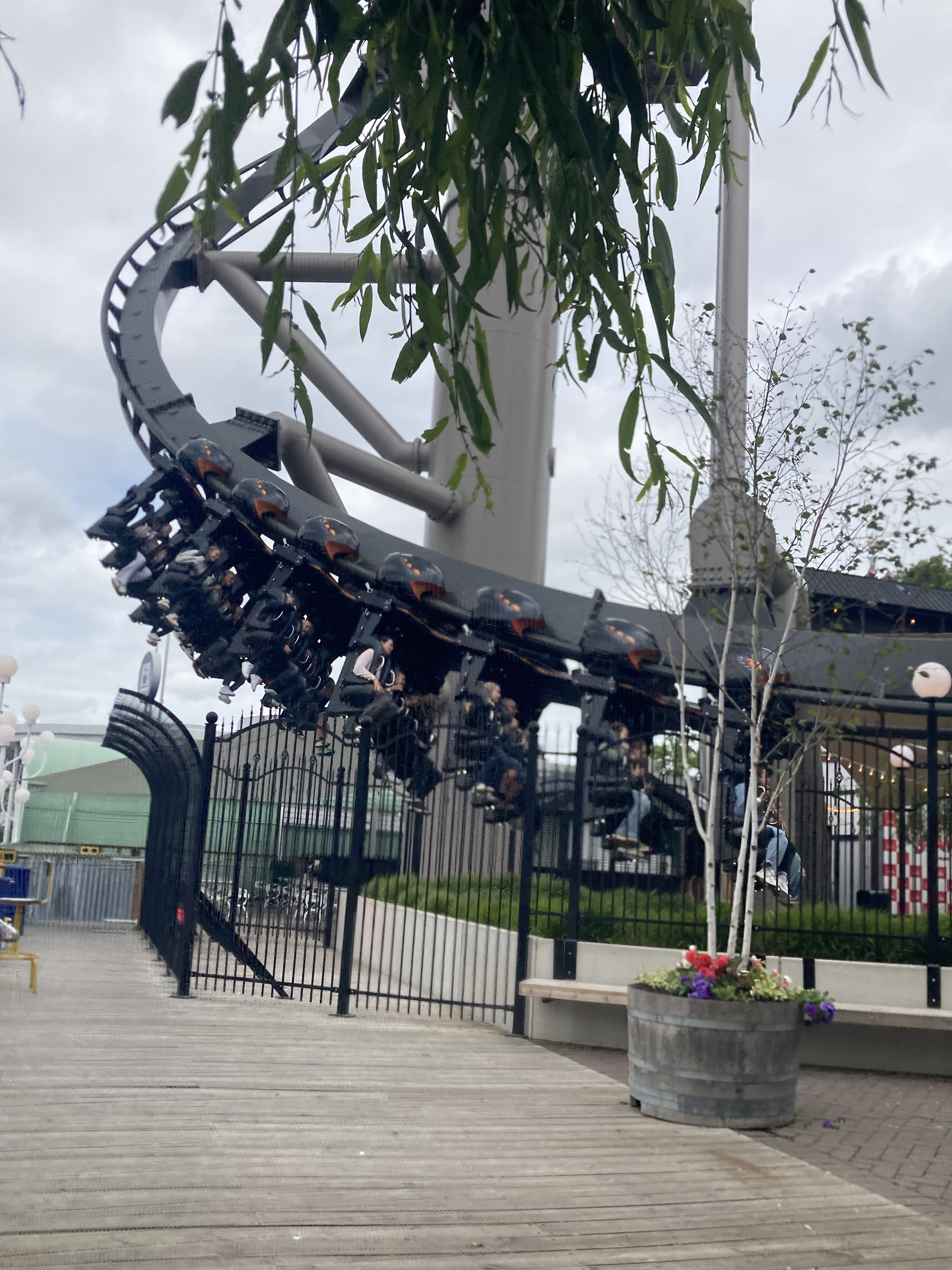
- Monster's first drop in 2025

Gröna Lund
- Location: Gröna Lund
- Park section: Tyrolen
- Coordinates: 59.323880°N 18.096066°E
- Status: Operating
- Opening date: 2 June 2021
- Cost: 450 million SEK
- Replaced: Radiobilarna, Snake

General statistics
- Type: Steel – Inverted
- Manufacturer: Bolliger & Mabillard
- Model: Inverted Coaster
- Lift/launch system: Chain lift hill
- Height: 111.5 ft (34.0 m)
- Length: 2,296.6 ft (700.0 m)
- Speed: 55.9 mph (90.0 km/h)
- Inversions: 3
- Capacity: 1 232 riders per hour
- G-force: 4.5
- Height restriction: 140–195 cm (4 ft 7 in – 6 ft 5 in)
- Trains: 2 trains with 7 cars. Riders are arranged 4 across in a single row for a total of 28 riders per train.
- Website: Official site
- Monster at RCDB

Monster is a steel inverted roller coaster at Gröna Lund in Stockholm, Sweden. The coaster was manufactured by Bolliger & Mabillard (B&M) and is the park's largest investment to date, with a price tag of 450 million Swedish krona (approximately €44.3 million). Development and construction of the coaster took several years, and a third of the park was redesigned to accommodate it.

The ride opened to the public on 2 June 2021.

== History ==
=== Development ===
Gröna Lund had initially set aside a parking lot located just north of the park to be used in future expansions in the mid-2000s. The prospect of a Bolliger & Mabillard coaster project was kept in mind for the site. In 2009, the park drafted plans to construct a B&M inverted coaster and a Funtime Starflyer. As the approval process for the coaster faced numerous delays, the latter concept made its way into the existing park for Gröna Lund's 130th anniversary in 2013, where it materialized as the 121-metre (397 ft) tall Eclipse. With no guarantee on when the expansion site would become available, park officials began planning to build the coaster within the existing park.

In February 2017, Gröna Lund unveiled their 700-metre (2,300 ft) long inverted coaster project, which was set to begin construction in 2018 and open for the 2020 season. The opening date was later revised to 2021, and an inversion was removed from the original layout.

=== Construction ===
Construction began on November 18, 2018, under the working title Blue Harvest. Over the course of the next two years, a third of the park's buildings were demolished and redesigned as the park dug deep into the ground for the station area. The bumper cars were removed after the 2018 season to accommodate the attraction, and relocated to the Furuvik Zoo. In addition, the park's beer garden was demolished to be reopened later in a different building.

To mask construction during the 2019 season, Gröna Lund created a temporary retro-themed area, stylizing the surroundings to mimic a 1950s traveling carnival. Management erected tents and set up a variety of carnival games and food stands. In addition, a temporary ride called Snake operated on top of the station pit for the 2019 season. Snake was relocated to Skara Sommarland following its run at Gröna Lund.

The first pieces of track were installed in late 2019, making up the brake run and station area. Despite the COVID-19 pandemic forcing the park's closure throughout 2020, Gröna Lund kept their 2021 opening timeline and continued construction on the ride. The lift hill was topped off on October 12, 2020, and the ride's first inversion, a zero-g roll, was installed in early November. The final track piece was placed on February 9, 2021.

=== Marketing and debut ===
On August 1, 2020, the name of the roller coaster was revealed to be Monster, and that its surrounding area would be themed loosely to the 1950s Meatpacking District in Manhattan. An animated on-ride POV was released online in November 2020.

Monster was originally slated to open alongside Gröna Lund on April 24, 2021. However, COVID-19 restrictions forced Gröna Lund to postpone their reopening date multiple times, until they eventually settled on a June 2 reopening when the government cleared them to do so. In late May, the park released a Stranger Things-esque advertisement to promote the ride's opening, which was positively received online. Monster officially debuted to the public on June 2, 2021.

== Characteristics ==
Monster is 34 metres (111.5 ft) tall, 700 metres (2,296.6 ft) long, and reaches top speeds of 90 km/h (55.9 mph). The coaster has two trains with seven cars, each of which seats four riders in a row, for a total of 28 riders per train.
