= 2019 Umeå GippsAero GA8 Airvan crash =

2019 aviation accident in Umeå, Sweden

2019 Skydive Umeå GippsAero GA8 Airvan crash
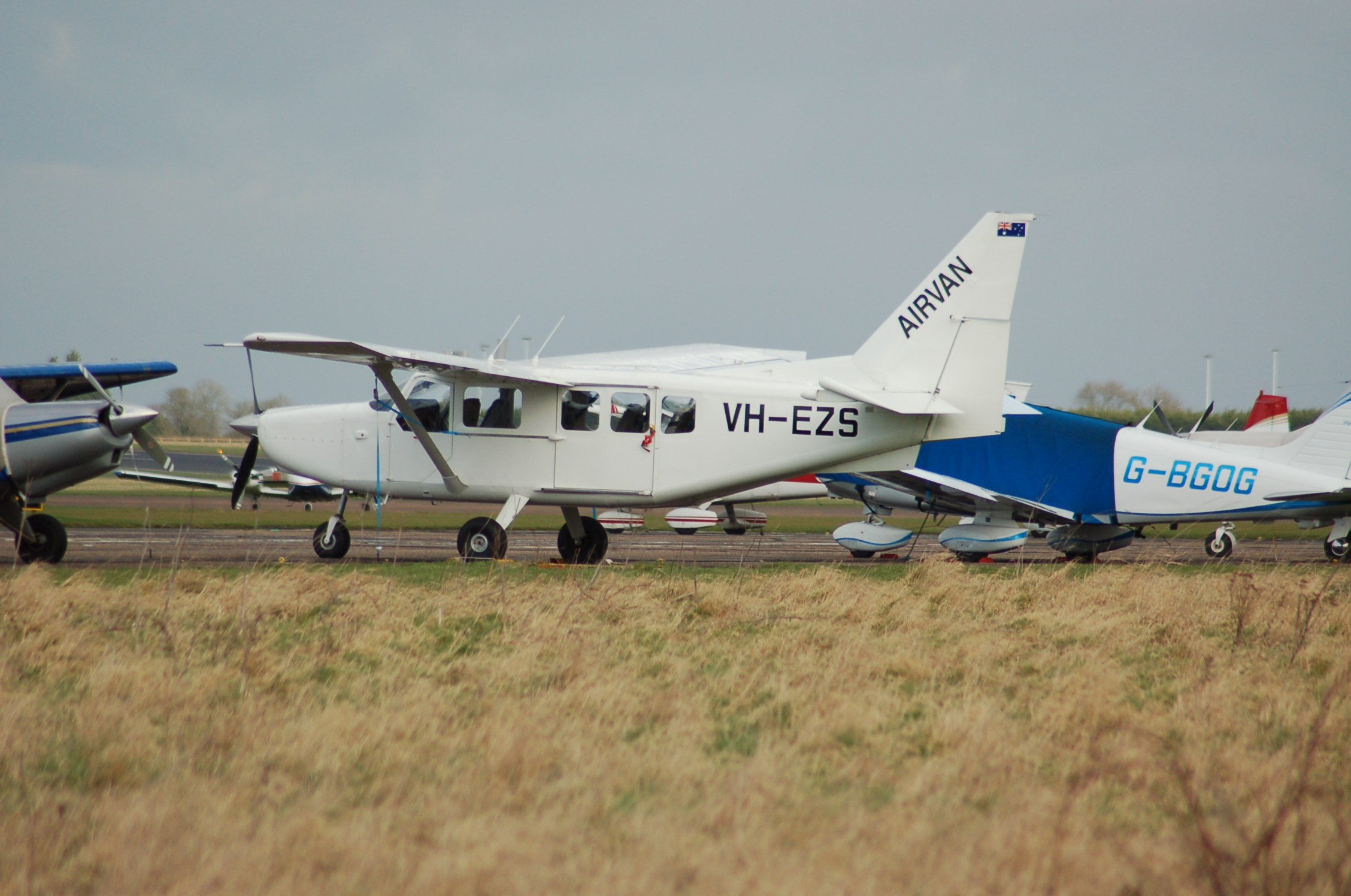
- The aircraft involved, when still carrying its former registration VH-EZS

Accident
- Date: 14 July 2019
- Summary: Structural failure following departure from controlled flight
- Site: Storsandskär, Umeå, Sweden

Aircraft
- Aircraft type: GippsAero GA8 Airvan
- Operator: Skydive Umeå
- Registration: SE-MES
- Flight origin: Umeå Airport
- Destination: Umeå Airport
- Occupants: 9
- Passengers: 8
- Crew: 1
- Fatalities: 9
- Survivors: 0

On 14 July 2019, a GippsAero GA8 Airvan crashed on a river islet in Sweden, killing all nine people on board. Structural failure of a wing is suspected as the cause of the accident. Consequently, the GippsAero GA8 Airvan was grounded by the Civil Aviation Safety Authority (CASA) in Australia, the Civil Aviation Authority (CAANZ) in New Zealand and the European Aviation Safety Agency (EASA) in the European Union. The grounding order was issued on 20 July and was due to run until 3 August, but was lifted early as CASA found there was no evidence for an unsafe condition, and the EASA said the wrecked aircraft had been exposed to aerodynamic loads beyond the limits specified in the type-certification basis.

== Accident ==
At 13:33 local time on 14 July 2019, the aircraft took off from Umeå Airport with the pilot and eight parachutists on board. A radio report was made that aircraft was at an altitude of 4,000 metres (13,000 ft), and the parachutists were ready to jump, but the aircraft crashed shortly after 14:00 on Storsandskär, an islet in the Ume River adjacent to Umeå Airport; all on board were killed. Witnesses reported that some of the parachutists tried to jump from the aircraft before it crashed. The Bothnia Line was consequently closed, but reopened at 18:30. The descent of the aircraft was filmed by a local inhabitant. The accident is the deadliest involving the GA8 Airvan.

On 19 July, EASA issued an Emergency Airworthiness Directive prohibiting the operation of the GippsAero GA8 Airvan in European Union airspace, effective 20 July until further notice. CASA also prohibited operation of the aircraft in Australian airspace effective 20 July for 15 days, but with an option to extend the timescale. On 20 July, the CAANZ suspended the airworthiness certificates of all GippsAero GA8 Airvan aircraft operating in New Zealand. CASA and EASA lifted the grounding order on 25 July.

== Aircraft ==
The accident aircraft was a GippsAero GA8-TC320 Airvan, with the registration SE-MES, c/n GA8-TC 320-12-178. Manufactured in 2012, the aircraft had previously operated in Australia under the registration VH-EZS.

== Investigation ==
The Swedish Accident Investigation Authority (Statens haverikommission, SHK) opened an investigation into the accident. Investigators from the SHK arrived on Storsandskär on 15 July, and on 16 July it was announced that the wreckage would be moved to the SHK's headquarters for further investigation. One avenue of investigation is the structural failure of a wing in flight.

A preliminary report was released on 18 September 2019. This report does not make any final conclusion but noted that the aircraft did dive very quickly and disintegrated in air.

The final report was issued on 9 September, 2020. This report concluded that, approximately 30 seconds before the parachutists were due to jump, the aircraft stalled and subsequently entered cloud in a rapid and accelerating descent. Lack of pilot experience and loss of visual cues precluded a subsequent recovery to controlled flight. Excessive loads experienced during the uncontrolled descent led to the break-up of the aircraft.

SHK calculated that the aircraft was probably overweight at takeoff with a centre of gravity (cg) aft of the permitted limit and noted that normal preparations for a parachuting run would have been expected to cause the cg to shift further aft at a time coincident with the stall. The resultant loss of longitudinal stability, combined with already low and decreasing airspeed at a time of high pilot workload probably led to the departure from controlled flight.

The report observed that:

- No mass and balance calculations had been carried out prior to the accident flight, and that parachuting operators in Sweden had no means of performing such calculations routinely.
- Although legally qualified to operate the flight, the pilot was inexperienced in parachuting operations and that there was no formal training mechanism available for the development and qualification of jump pilots
- Parachutists were generally unaware of the importance of respecting mass and balance limits and the accident aircraft carried no markings or notices to enable them to comply with these limits.

Corresponding recommendations to the European Aviation Safety Agency and the Swedish Transport Agency were made.
