= Olof Forssberg =

Swedish jurist and civil servant (1938–2023)

Erik Olof Forssberg (28 July 1937 – 11 March 2023) was a Swedish jurist and civil servant. He served as Director General of the Swedish Accident Investigation Authority from 1987 to 1997.

== Early life ==
Forssberg was born on 28 July 1937 in Hudiksvall Parish in Hudiksvall, Sweden, the son of Ragnar Forssberg, a lawyer, and his wife Gunborg (née Genberg). He received a Candidate of Law degree from Uppsala University in 1961.

== Career ==
Forssberg carried out court service from 1961 to 1964, before becoming an extra legal clerk (fiskal) in the Court of Appeal for Northern Norrland in 1964. He served as court secretary in 1966, as assessor in 1970, and became Hovrättsråd in 1979. Forssberg was an adviser in the Ministry of Defence 1971 and served as director-general for legal affairs there in 1979. He was Director General of the Swedish Accident Investigation Authority from 1987 to 1997.

Forssberg was forced to leave the position of Director-General of the Swedish Accident Investigation Authority because it was revealed in the investigation into the sinking of the MS Estonia that he had lied about whether he had received a document from an official at the Swedish Maritime Administration. He had received the document a week before but had not properly registered it. To avoid explaining this, he lied and said that the document had not reached the authority. The leader of the Finnish part of the Estonia disaster investigation commission, Kari Lehtola, claimed that the demand for Forssberg's resignation was 'a very typical overreaction,' while former Minister of Justice Gun Hellsvik, for example, believed that the resignation was necessary because 'if the chairman of the Swedish part of the authority has lied, it means that trust in the investigation is lost.

Forssberg then served as director general in the Ministry of Communications from 1997 to 1998 and as chief judge in the Svea Court of Appeal in Stockholm from 1998 to 2004 when he retired.

Forssberg had investigation and legislative assignments from 1971. He was chairman of the Överklagandenämnden för totalförsvaret ("Board of Appeal for the Total Defence") from 1992 and chairman of the National Swedish Claims Adjustment Board (Statens skaderegleringsnämnd) from 1998. He was also chairman of the Swedish Ethical Review Board (Etikprövningsnämnden).

== Personal life ==
In 1964, Forssberg married the primary school teacher Inger Larsson (born 1940), the daughter of the district court judge Wolrath Larsson and Fanny (née Pettersson). He had four sons: Per, William, Jan and Mats.

== Death ==
Forssberg died on 11 March 2023 in Sundbyberg District in Sundbyberg Municipality, Stockholm County.

== Bibliography ==
- Forssberg, Olof (1987). Svensk kärnvapenforskning 1945-1972 [Swedish Nuclear Weapons Research 1945-1972] (in Swedish). Stockholm: Försvarsdep. SELIBR 621612.

Legal offices
Preceded by Göran Steen	Director General of the Swedish Accident Investigation Authority; 1987–1997	Succeeded by Ann-Louise Eksborg
