= Santino (chimpanzee) =

Chimpanzee held in Sweden (1978–2022)

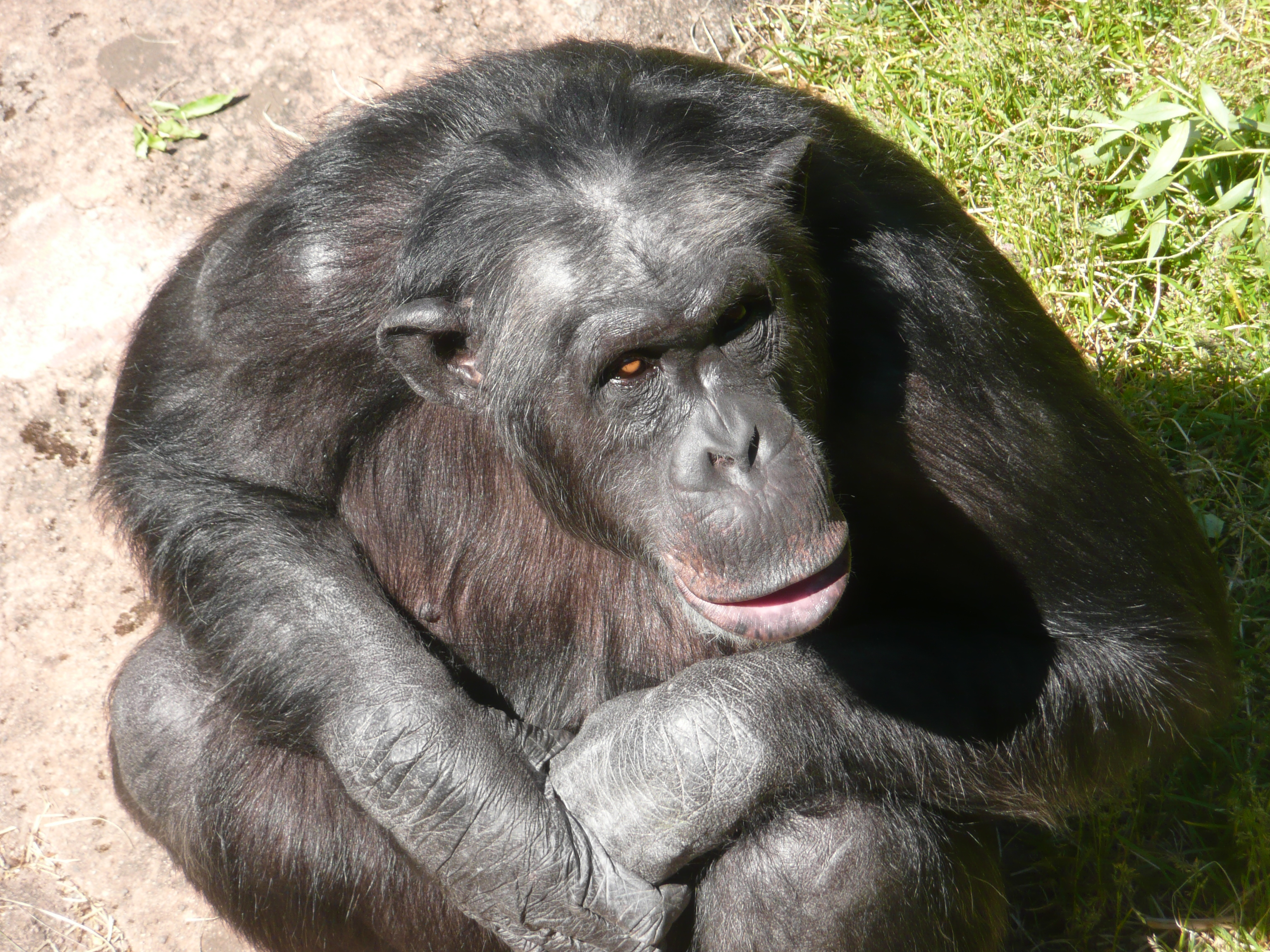
- Santino in June 2012
- Species: Chimpanzee
- Sex: Male
- Born: 20 April 1978
- Died: 14 December 2022 (aged 44); Furuvik Zoo, Furuvik, Sweden
- Cause of death: Gunshot wound
- Residence: Furuvik Zoo

Santino (20 April 1978 – 14 December 2022) was a male chimpanzee held at Furuvik Zoo in Sweden. In March 2009, it was reported that Santino had planned hundreds of stone-throwing attacks on visitors to the zoo.

== Biography ==
Zookeepers noticed that Santino had dragged a large quantity of stones from a moat around his enclosure, and that the Chimpanzee had even broken chunks of concrete into crude discs.

He made the piles of stones only on the part of his island facing the crowds. Dr. Mathias Osvath, a cognitive zoologist from Lund University, together with Elin Karvonen, studied the phenomenon, and their studies suggest that Santino's behaviour showed that planning and premeditated deception are not uniquely human traits.

To control his behaviour, and keep his hormone levels down, zookeepers castrated Santino. Afterwards, Santino had been observed to be more playful and was described as growing a "Buddha belly".

Santino was shot after escaping his enclosure in December 2022, and later died from his injuries.

== Media coverage ==
On 19 March 2009, Santino and his attacks were mentioned as a part of "when animals attack our morals" on The Colbert Report.

== See also ==
- List of individual apes
