= Furuvik Zoo =

Amusement park and zoo in Furuvik, Sweden

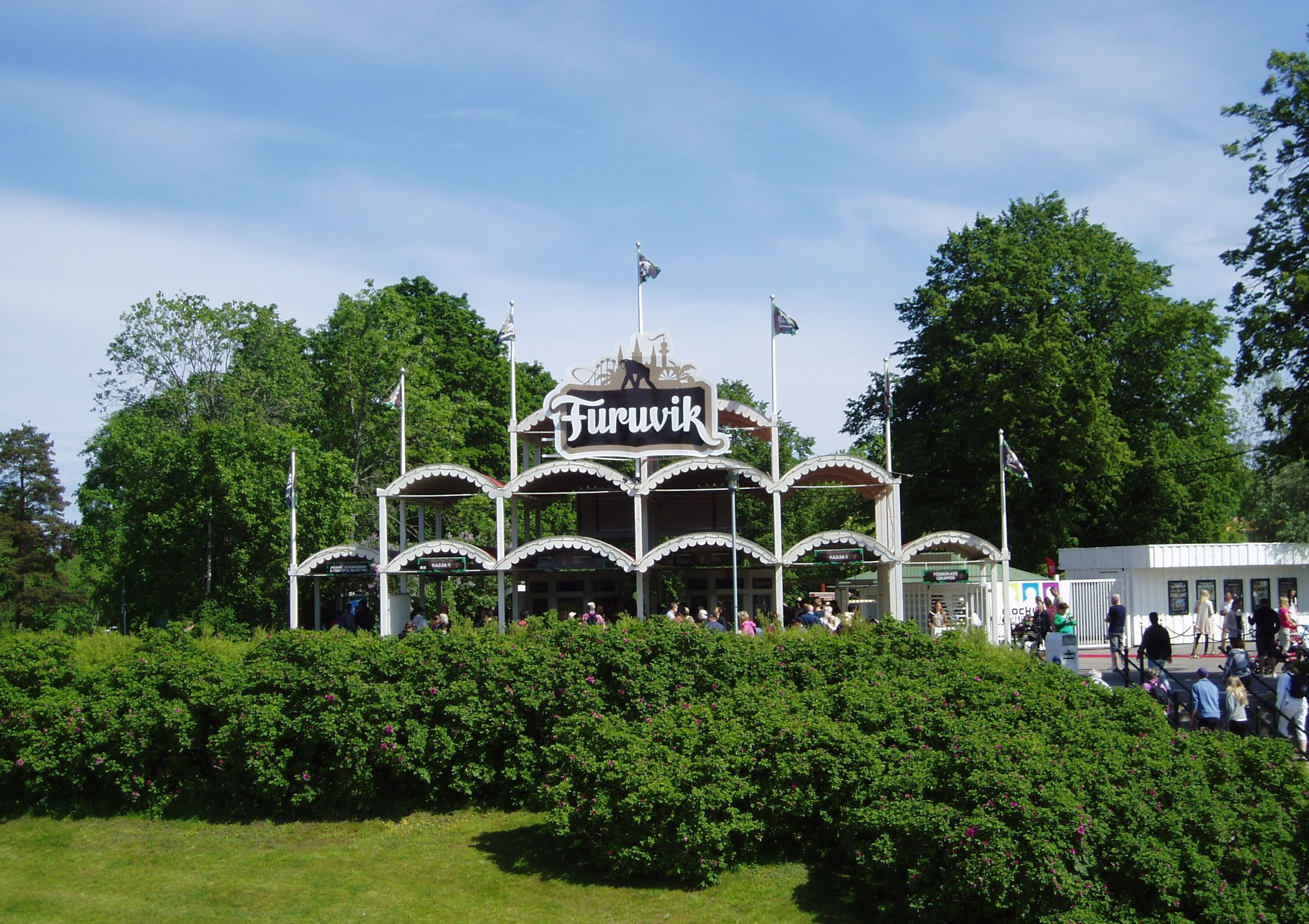
- Interactive map of Furuvik Zoo
- 60°39′5″N 17°19′58″E
- Date opened: 1900
- Location: Furuvik
- Website: www.furuvik.se

Furuvik Zoo (Swedish: Furuviksparken) is an amusement park and zoo in Furuvik, Sweden.

== Location ==
The zoo is located in Furuvik, near Gävle, Sweden.

== History ==
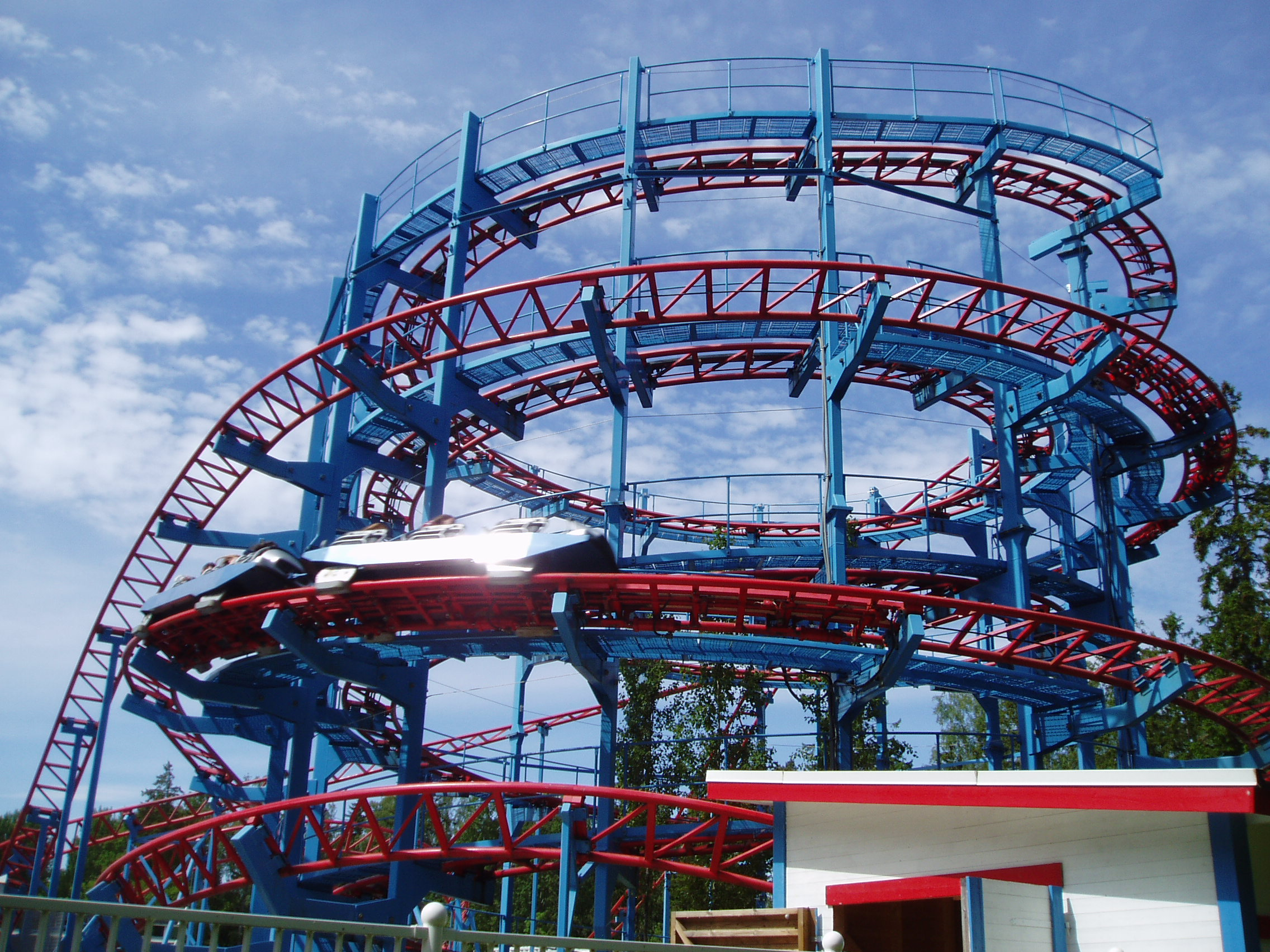
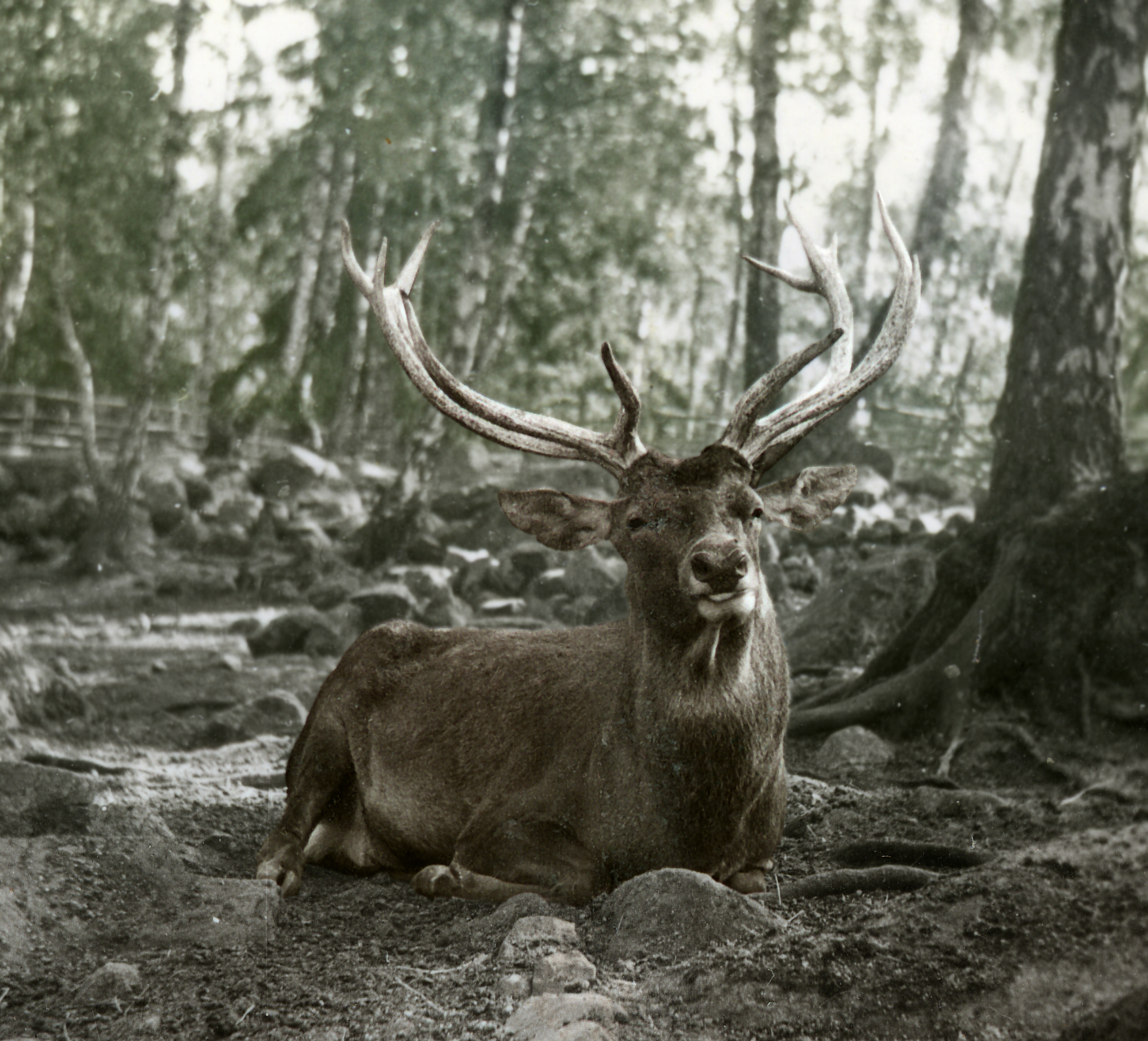
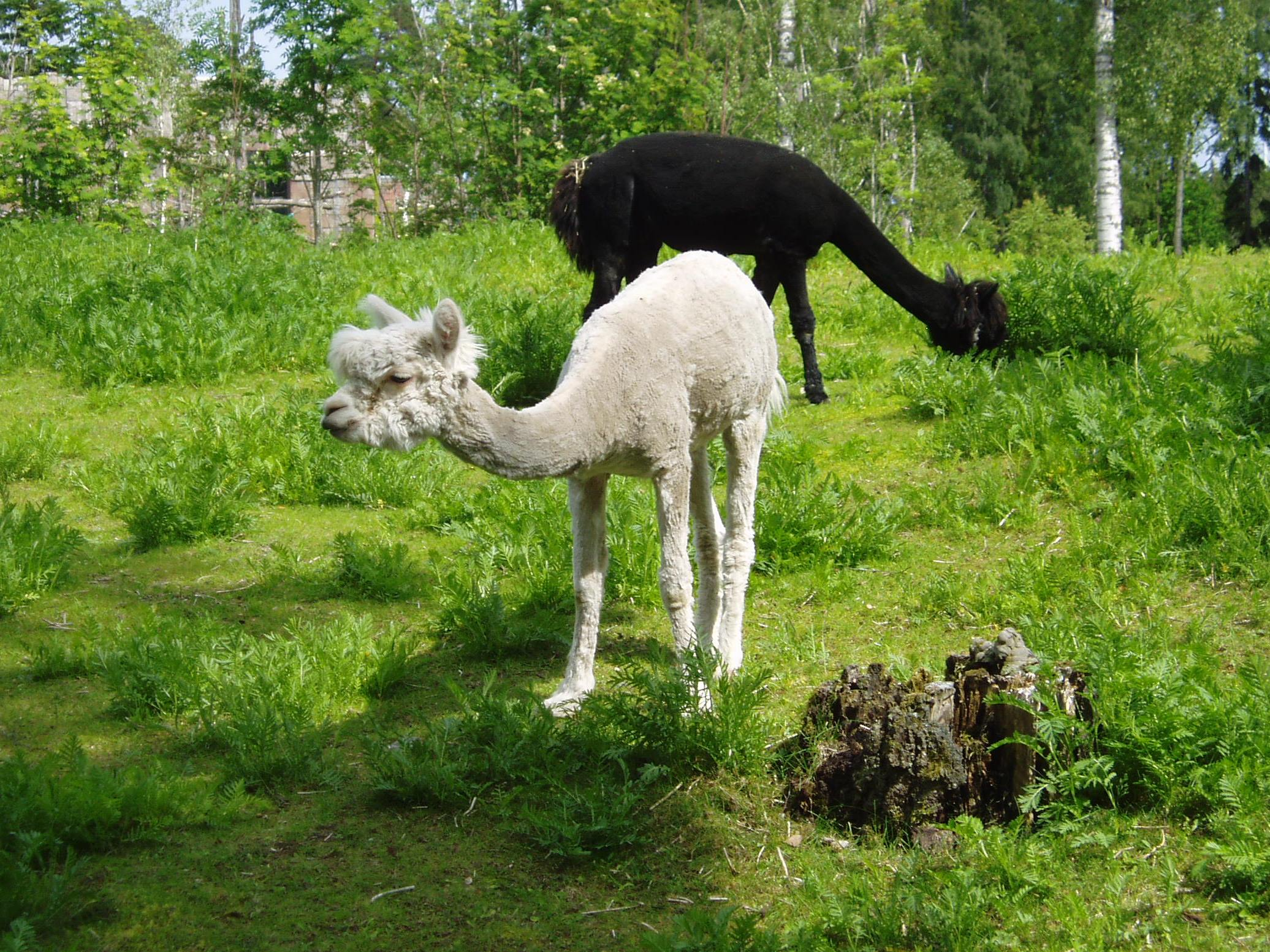
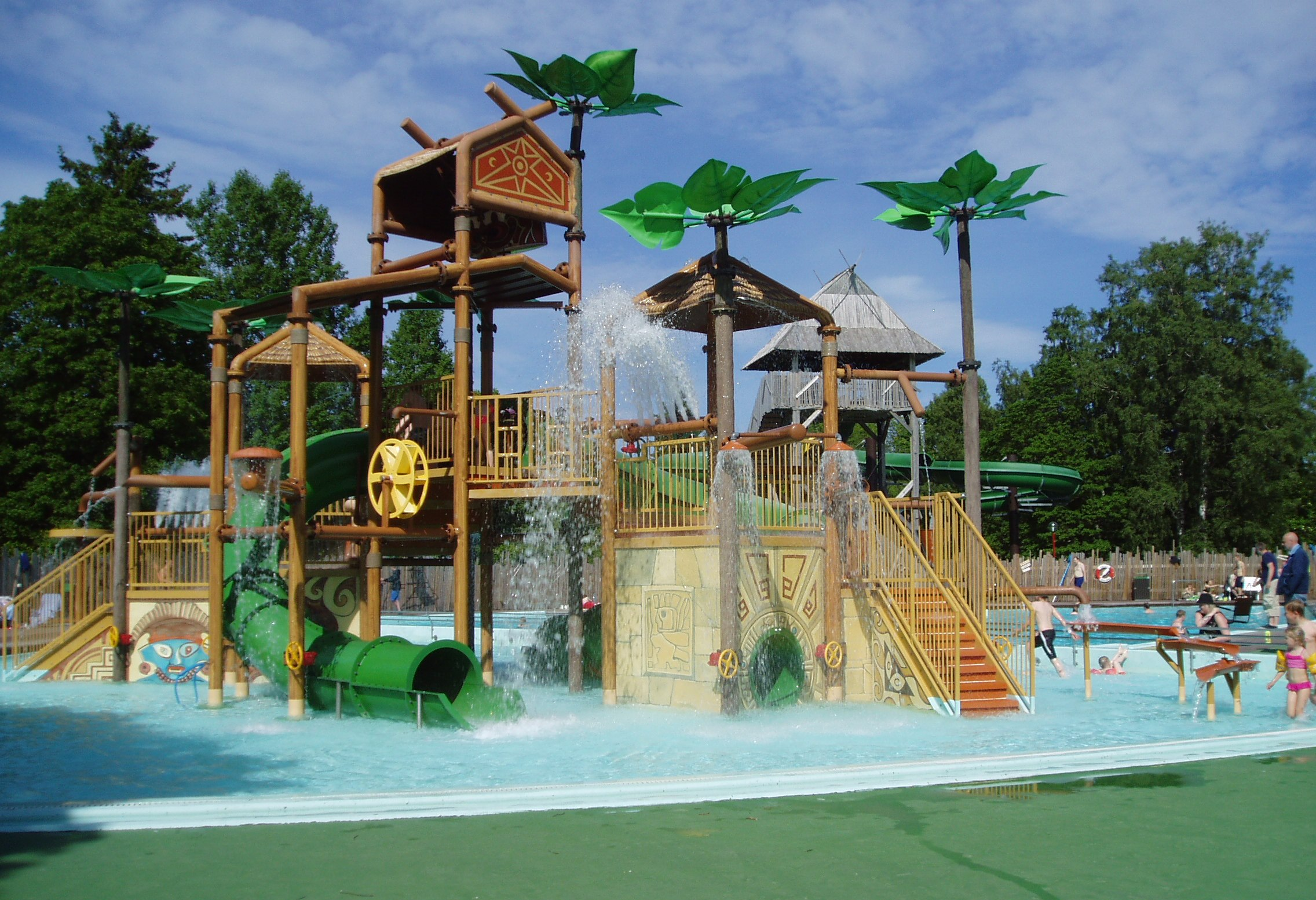

Furuviksparken was founded in 1900 by Oscar Jakobsson and officially opened by count Olle Cronstedt. In 1938 the zoo was bought by Gösta Nygren, who managed the zoo for 45 years. Nygren established a youth circus, Furuviksbarnen (the children of Furuvik), which became the main attraction not only in the park but also on travelling tours. Nyhren also introduced live concerts with famous artists, like Louis Armstrong, Jussi Björling and Sammy Davis.

Gävle Municipality took over the park 1983, again sold to Tom Widorson in 2004, and in 2010 sold to the present owner, Parks & Resorts Scandinavia AB.

== Rides ==
=== Roller coasters ===
Name	Year opened	Manufacturer	Notes
Fireball	2017	Vekoma	Family Boomerang Rebound coaster
Draken	2020	Zierer	
Lightning	2023	Vekoma	LIM launch coaster

=== Other rides ===
Ride	Year opened	Manufacturer	Description
Barnkarusellen	2011	Unknown	Merry-go-round
Barnrally	1975	Unknown	Track Ride
Bikupan	2011	HUSS	Junior Swingaround Carousel
Gungan	2016	Zamperla	Happy Swing
Kättingflygaren	2013	Zierer	Waveswinger
Radiobilarna	2019	Gosetto	Bumper cars
Sky Tower	2008	Zamperla	Drop tower
Små Grodorna	2006	Zamperla	Jump Around
Spökjakten	2018	Sally Corporation	Interactive Dark Ride
Tekopparna	1986	Mack Rides	Teacups
Tornado	2008	Zamperla	Disk'O

=== Former rides ===
Ride	Year opened	Year closed	Manufacturer	Description
Batman	2007	2008	Fabbri	Spinning Wild Mouse Roller Coaster
Flygande Elefanter	1987	2004	Unknown	Jets Carousel
Frisbee	2002	2003	HUSS	Frisbee
Hurucan	2013	2024	Mondial	Top Scan, previously operated as Extreme at Gröna Lund
Piraten	1986	2012	SDC	Pirate Ship
Rocket	2011	2021	Schwarzkopf	Steel Roller Coaster, previously operated as Black Hole at Alton Towers
Spökborgen	1986	2017	Unknown	Ghost Train, rebuilt into Spökjakten
Superloopen	1991	2000	Pinfari	Steel Roller Coaster

== Chimpanzees ==
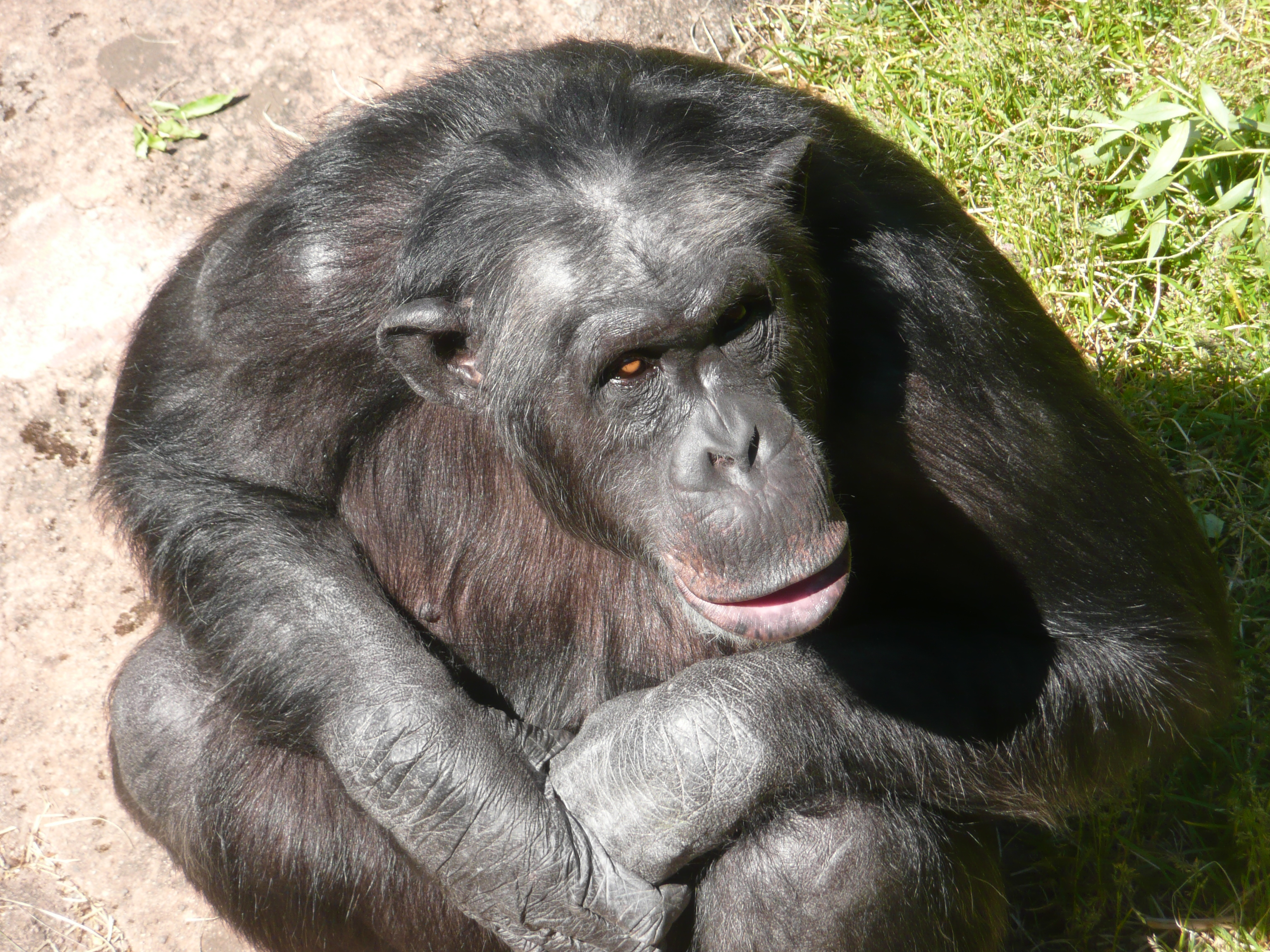
Santino

The zoo attracted a degree of international attention when it was reported in March 2009 that a chimpanzee residing there had planned attacks on visitors. Santino planned attacks by taking stones from the protective moat and placing them only on the side facing the visitors on the island where he lived. Later, when the visitors arrived, he would throw the stones across the moat at them.

This shows that the cognitive ability for forward planning is not uniquely human.

After five chimpanzees' escape from the zoo in December 2022, three were shot dead - the 3-year-old Torsten, Linda and Santino -, one was wounded, and one returned to the zoo. Later, a fourth was shot dead.
