= Borås Djurpark =

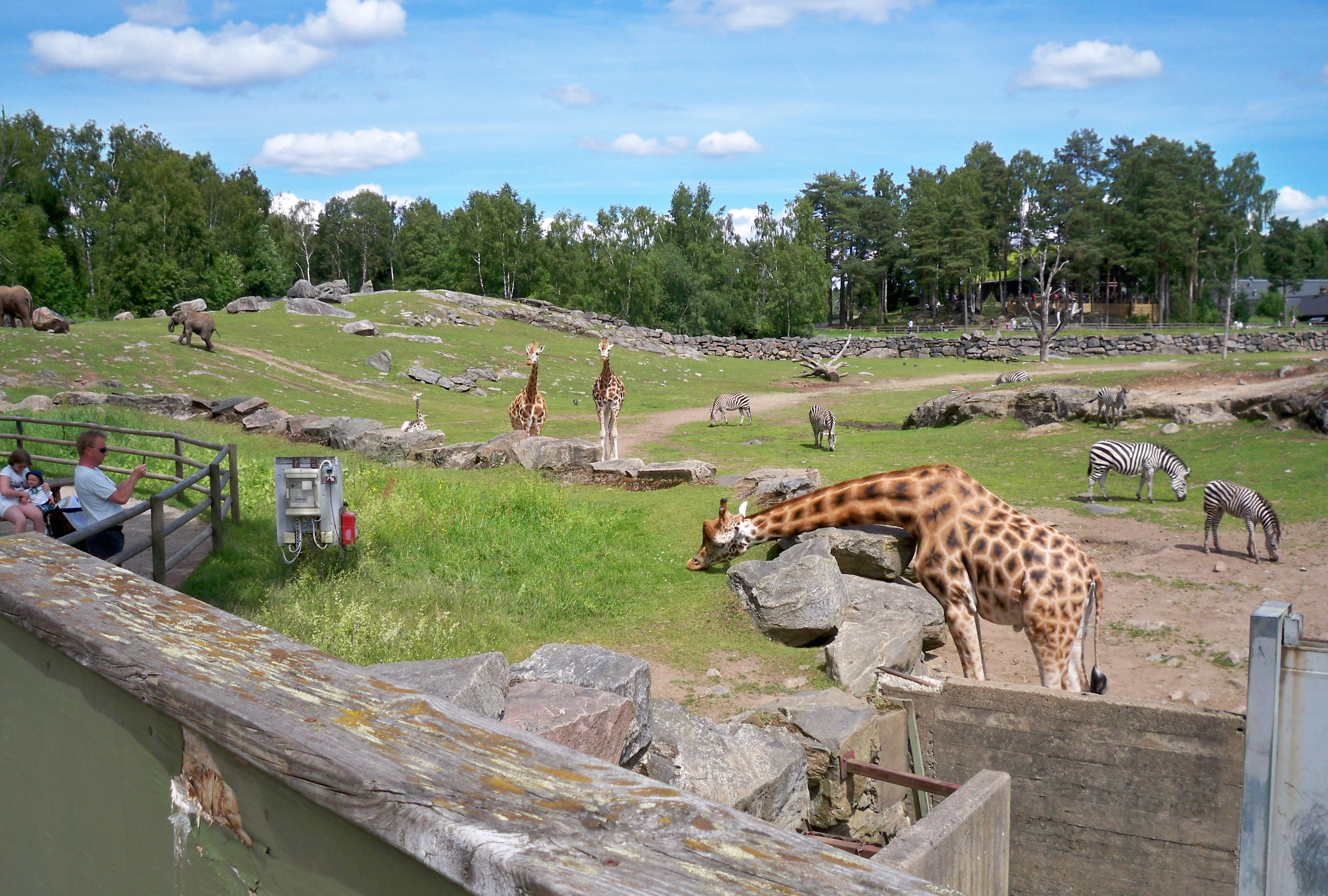
- The savannah at the zoo
- Interactive map of Borås Djurpark
- 57°44′29″N 12°56′57″E
- Date opened: 1962
- Location: Borås, Sweden
- Land area: 40 ha (99 acres)
- No. of animals: 500+
- No. of species: 80
- Memberships: EAZA, ISIS
- Website: www.borasdjurpark.se/en

Borås Djurpark is a 40-hectare (99-acre) zoo in the northern part of central Borås, Sweden. It has about 500 animals of 80 different species. The zoo was founded in 1962 by Sigvard Berggren, who was manager until 1969.

Borås Djurpark is a member of the European Association of Zoos and Aquaria (EAZA). It is the only zoo in Sweden that has African bush elephant.

== List of animals ==
- Brown bear
- Gray seal
- Harbor seal
- Eurasian lynx
- Wisent
- Lion
- Cotton-top tamarin
- Bornean orangutan
- Banded mongoose
- Celebes crested macaque
- Chimpanzee
- Lar gibbon
- African savanna elephant
- African wild dog
- Rothschild's giraffe
- Blesbok
- Egyptian tortoise
- Common eland
- Cheetah
- Grant's zebra
- Helmeted guineafowl
- Bongo
- African buffalo
- Greater flamingo
- Common ostrich
- White rhinoceros
- Spotted hyena
- Humboldt penguin
- Wolverine
- Red panda

There are some farm animals as well, such as cows, horses, sheep, goats, ducks, and pigs.

== Conservation ==
As a member of the European Association of Zoos and Aquariums, the zoo participates in nine of about 130 breeding programs sponsored by the European Endangered Species Programme (EEP).
