= Jetline (roller coaster) =

Former roller coaster at Gröna Lund

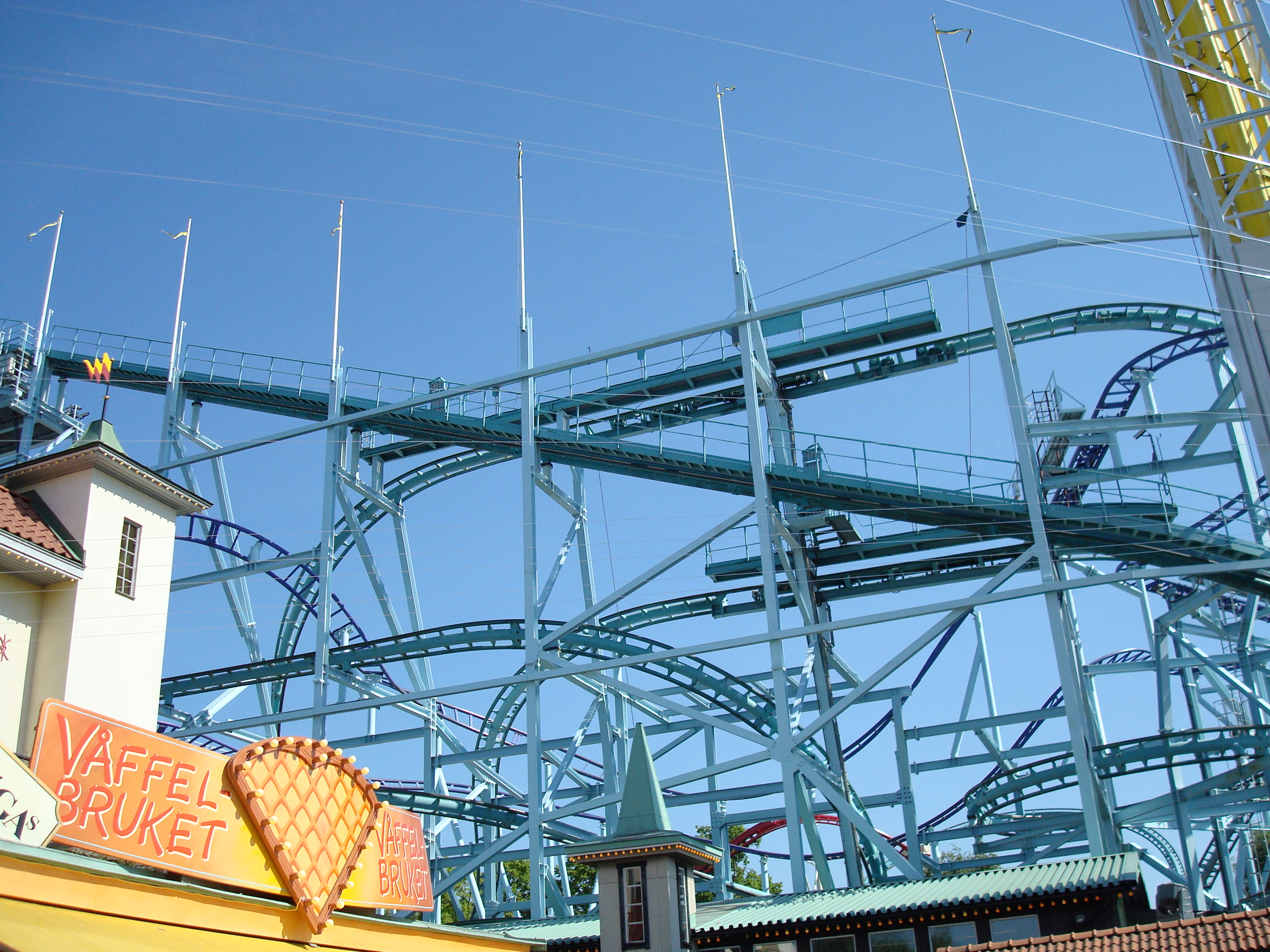
- Jetline in June 2007

Gröna Lund
- Location: Gröna Lund
- Coordinates: 59°19′23″N 18°05′44″E
- Status: Removed
- Opening date: 23 April 1988
- Closing date: 25 June 2023

General statistics
- Type: Steel
- Manufacturer: Zierer
- Designer: Werner Stengel
- Height: 105 ft (32 m)
- Length: 2,624.8 ft (800.0 m)
- Speed: 55.9 mph (90.0 km/h)
- Inversions: 0
- Duration: 1:30
- Max vertical angle: 80°
- Capacity: 1,300 riders per hour
- G-force: 4.5
- Trains: Unknown number of trains with 7 cars; riders arranged 2 across in a single row for a total of 14 riders per train
- Jetline at RCDB

Jetline was a steel roller coaster at Gröna Lund in Stockholm, Sweden. It opened on 23 April 1988 and was built by Zierer. In 2000, it was modified by Maurer AG to have a longer and steeper first drop, as well as to feature a tunnel at the bottom of the drop.

On 25 June 2023, a derailment occurred, causing the death of one rider and injuries to nine others. The ride did not operate again after this incident, and was eventually dismantled.

== Ride experience ==
The ride started with a curved lift hill that carried the ride vehicle to a height of 32 metres (105 ft). A right turn led into the first drop, which was covered by a short tunnel. The train turned back towards the station and entered a short brake section before falling into the second drop. The second half of the ride was composed of banked turns and helices. The last helix lead into a tunnel and the brake run. The total duration of the ride was approximately one minute and thirty seconds.

== Incident ==
Jetline accident
- Date: June 25, 2023
- Type: Roller coaster derailment
- Cause: Improperly manufactured replacement parts
- Participants: 14
- Outcome: Ride permanently closed, park closed for a week and eventually fined
- Deaths: 1
- Injuries: 9

On 25 June 2023, eleven people were on the ride when it derailed. Three people fell out of the vehicle, one of whom died, and the other two were seriously injured. Seven other people were sent to hospital with injuries, and the remaining riders were evacuated safely. In the aftermath of the accident, Gröna Lund closed the park for a week.

The roller coaster remained closed while the Swedish Accident Investigation Authority investigated the accident. On 14 June 2024, the final report about the accident was released, revealing that cracks were discovered in the ride's front control arm. It was also announced on this day that Jetline would close permanently.

On 28 January 2026, Gröna Lund was sentenced by the Stockholm District Court and fined kr 5,200,000 over the accident. GMW was fined kr 1,300,000, while Mekosmos was acquitted.

== Reception ==
Golden Ticket Awards: Top steel Roller Coasters
Year									1998	1999
Ranking									–	–
Year	2000	2001	2002	2003	2004	2005	2006	2007	2008	2009
Ranking	–	–	–	–	–	–	–	–	–	–
Year	2010	2011	2012	2013	2014	2015	2016	2017	2018	2019
Ranking	–	–	–	–	–	–	–	–	39 (tie)	–
Year	2020	2021	2022	2023	2024	2025	2026			
Ranking	N/A	–	48	–	–	–	–			
