= Furuvik =

- Location within Sweden Gävleborg Location within Sweden
- Coordinates: 60°39′N 17°20′E
- Country: Sweden
- Province: Gästrikland
- County: Gävleborg County
- Municipality: Gävle Municipality

Area
  - Total: 1.10 km^{2} (0.42 sq mi)

Population (31 December 2010)
  - Total: 575
  - Density: 524/km^{2} (1,360/sq mi)
- Time zone: UTC+1 (CET)
  - Summer (DST): UTC+2 (CEST)

Furuvik is a locality situated in Gävle Municipality, Gävleborg County, Sweden with 575 inhabitants in 2010.

== Furuvik Zoo ==
Furuvik Zoo (Furuviksparken) is an amusement park and zoo in Furuvik. It attracted a degree of international attention when it was reported in March 2009 that a chimpanzee residing there had planned attacks on visitors. Santino planned attacks by taking stones from the protective moat and placing them only on the side facing the visitors on the island where he lives. Later, when the visitors arrived, he would throw the stones across the moat at them.

This shows that the cognitive ability for forward planning is not uniquely human.
