= Swedish Accident Investigation Authority =

Swedish government agency

- Statens haverikommission

Agency overview
- Formed: 1 July 1978
- Headquarters: Sveavägen 151, Stockholm, Sweden
- Agency executive: Hans Ytterberg, Director General
- Parent department: Ministry of Defence
- Key document: SFS 2007:860
- Website: www.havkom.se/en/

The Swedish Accident Investigation Authority (Swedish: Statens haverikommission, SHK), formerly the Swedish Accident Investigation Board in English, is a Swedish government agency tasked with investigating all types of serious civil or military accidents that can occur on land, on the sea or in the air. Incidents are also to be investigated if there was a serious risk of an accident. Its headquarters are in Stockholm.

== Directors General ==
Directors General:

- 1978-07-01 – 1987-06-30: Göran Steen
- 1987-07-01 – 1997-05-29: Olof Forssberg
- 1997-05-30 – 1997-06-08: S-E Sigfridsson (acting)
- 1997-06-09 – 2002-01-06: Ann-Louise Eksborg
- 2002-01-07 – 2004-01-31: Lena Svenaeus
- 2004-02-01 – 2004-05-31: Carin Hellner (acting)
- 2004-04-01 – 2011-04-17: Åsa Kastman Heuman
- 2011-04-18 – 2020-05-01: Hans Ytterberg
- 2020-05-01 – present: John Ahlberk

== Notable investigations ==
- Scandinavian Airlines Flight 751 (1991)
- M/S Estonia (1994)
- Nosaby level crossing accident (2004)
- Falsterbo Swedish Coast Guard C-212 crash (2006)
- MV Finnbirch (2006)
- Norwegian Air Force C-130 crash (2012)
- Saltsjöbanan train crash (2013)
- West Air Sweden Flight 294 (2016)
- Skydive Umeå Gippsland GA8 Airvan crash (2019)
- 2023 Jetline roller coaster accident (2023)

== See also ==
- Swedish Civil Aviation Administration
- Swedish Maritime Administration
