= List of attractions at Busch Gardens Tampa Bay =

List of attractions in Florida, US

This is a list of attractions in Busch Gardens Tampa Bay.

== Roller coasters ==
Roller coasters currently operating or under construction at Busch Gardens Tampa.

Ride	Manufacturer	Year opened	Notes	Section	Ref(s)
Montu	Bolliger & Mabillard	1996	A 150-foot-tall (46 m) steel inverted roller coaster with seven inversions. It has received a #3 Golden Ticket Awards ranking.	Egypt	
SheiKra	Bolliger & Mabillard	2005	A 200-foot-tall (61 m) floorless dive roller coaster with a 90-degree vertical drop. It was the first roller coaster of its kind in the United States, and is also one of the tallest roller coasters in Florida, next to Mako at SeaWorld Orlando and Iron Gwazi as the only coasters in the state exceeding 200 feet. It has received a #13 Golden Ticket Awards ranking.	Stanleyville	
Air Grover	Zierer	2010	A single train children's roller coaster with magnetic brakes.	Sesame Street Safari of Fun	
Cheetah Hunt	Intamin	2011	Paired with an animal encounter called Cheetah Run, this is Busch Gardens' first launch coaster, immediately propelling riders from 0 to 60 mph. The ride features three separate launch points throughout the 4,429-foot (1,350 m) track, and includes a 130-foot (40 m) drop and races across a faux Serengeti plain and through a man-made canyon. The layout also includes a mid-ride parabola that gives riders the sensation of weightlessness for three seconds.	Crown Colony Plaza	
Cobra's Curse	Mack Rides	2016	A spinning roller coaster with an elevator lift and a near-miss of an 80 foot (24 m) statue.	Egypt	
Tigris	Premier Rides	2019	A Sky Rocket II model. Tigris replaced the Tanganyika Tidal Wave attraction.	Stanleyville	
Iron Gwazi	Rocky Mountain Construction	2022	A hybrid wooden steel roller coaster that replaced Gwazi. The ride is taller than SheiKra at 206 feet and is touted for holding the record for the world's steepest and fastest hybrid roller coaster, and the tallest roller coaster of its kind in North America. The ride soft opened on February 13, 2022, and officially opened on March 11, 2022, after setbacks triggered by the COVID-19 pandemic.	Morocco	
Phoenix Rising	Bolliger & Mabillard	2024	A family inverted roller coaster that replaced the former Sand Serpent and Phoenix attractions.	Pantopia	

== Water ride ==
Water ride that is currently operating at Busch Gardens Tampa.

Ride	Year opened	Notes	Section	Ref(s)
Congo River Rapids	1982	A river rapids ride that simulates raging whitewater rapids.	Congo	

== Other rides and attractions ==
Rides and attractions that are currently operating at Busch Gardens Tampa.

Ride	Year opened	Notes	Section	Ref(s)
Serengeti Express	1971	A two-mile (3 km) railroad journey on replica steam trains that traverses the Serengeti Plain. It originally only stopped in Nairobi, but added stations in Congo and Stanleyville after those lands were added to the park. In 2017, the Congo Train Station was closed. However, in April 2022, the Congo Train Station was reopened.	Nairobi/Stanleyville/Congo	
SkyRide	1974	A ride that transports guests from Cheetah Hunt Plaza to the Stanleyville area of the park. The load station shares a building with the Cheetah Hunt roller coaster. It has a turn station at the edge of the Serengeti where the ride makes over a 90 degree turn that guests are not allowed to disembark from. Guests are required to disembark and re-enter in order to make a round trip. The attraction was closed from March 2020 to February 2024.	Cheetah Hunt Plaza/Stanleyville	
Ubanga-Banga Bumper Cars	1977	A standard bumper cars ride.	Congo	
Carousel Caravan	1979	A carousel.	Pantopia	
Gwazi Gliders	2001	A hang glider flat ride for children. Children push and pull bars to raise and lower their gliders.	Bird Gardens	
Rosita's Djembe Fly-Away	2010	A swing ride. It has the smallest height restriction in the park as children over 44" may not ride.	Sesame Street Safari of Fun	
Falcon's Fury	2014	A 335-foot (102m) drop tower that upon reaching the top turns you 90 degrees mid air turn to face the rider down. Then, it drops you with a max speed of 60 mph and a freefall time of 5 seconds. It is currently North America's tallest operating freestanding drop tower.	Pantopia	
Serengeti Flyer	2023	A 68 mph, 135 foot Screamin' Swing attraction. When it opened, it was the world's tallest and fastest ride of its kind.	Nairobi	
Treetop Drop	2008/2025	A small drop tower manufactured by Moser.	Wild Oasis	

== Shows ==
Current shows that are at Busch Gardens Tampa as of April 2024.

Show	Year opened	Notes	Section	Ref(s)
Rhythm of Nature	2024	An ice skating show that replaced Turn It Up!/Turn It Up! Remix.	Morocco	
Icons	2024	Featuring live performances of fan-favorite songs from legendary bands and artists, this show will have guests singing and dancing along in the Dragon Fire Grill	Pantopia	
Animal Tails	2023	This presentation introduces some of the animals and zookeepers throughout Busch Gardens Tampa Bay. From animals large and small, guests can learn about the importance of conservation and how they can protect Busch Gardens Tampa Bay's animal ambassadors' native environment. This show runs twice a day.	Pantopia	
Welcome To Our Street	2023	A show where the Sesame Street characters put on a welcome show for their new friends but are unsure what kind until creating a spectacular one when realizing they can work together.	Sesame Street Safari of Fun	
Cirque Electric	2021	Cirque Electric features talented dancers, exhilarating acrobats, a professional hoola hooper and roller skaters. This show is run every Friday-Monday during Summer Celebration at the Stanleyville Theater.	Stanleyville	

== Former attractions and shows ==
These attractions or shows are either closed or demolished.

Attraction/Show	Year opened	Year closed	Notes	Section	Ref(s)
African Queen Boat Ride	1977	1989	A boat ride (similar to Disney's Jungle Cruise attraction) that included live animals and was located in what is Tigris today. It originally operated as Livingstone's Landing from 1972 to 1977. The ride was transformed into Tanganyika Tidal Wave in 1989 with new boats and a drop section.	Stanleyville	
Kaleidoscope	1986	1990	Kaleidoscope was a Broadway-style musical, transplanted from Busch Gardens Williamsburg, where the show was performed at the Magic Lantern Theater years earlier. The show operated with a swing cast. Accordingly, about twenty performers were available to fill the twelve roles which comprised the show. Many of the performers were required to learn more than one role, and could therefore "swing" into another part as needed. As a result, Kaleidoscope was performed four times a day every day for over five years.	Morocco	
Swinging Vines	1977	Circa 1991	A wave swinger flat ride that swings its riders around in a circle.	Congo	
Stanleyville Amphitheater Variety Show	1980	1994	A variety show featuring a collection of circus, animal, and novelty acts which changed on a regular basis. The 30-40-minute show was hosted by a master of ceremonies.	Stanleyville	
Around the World on Ice	1990	1994	A musical revue show at the Moroccan Palace theater that took the audience to various places around the world, including Egypt, France, and Russia. This show replaced "Kaleidoscope" at the Moroccan Palace Theater.	Morocco	
Stairway to the Stars	1959	1995	Guests boarded what was said to be the world's longest outdoor escalator for a ride up to an observation platform, on the roof of the on-site Anheuser-Busch beer brewery. From there, guests wended their way back down in a walking tour of the brewery. The elscalator and brewery closed in 1995 and was later demolished. The site of the brewery was later taken up by the Gwazi roller coaster.	Bird Gardens	
Monstrous Mamba	1976	1995	A flat ride that spun riders around as arms raised the cars up and down.	Congo	
Dwarf Village	1983	1995	A small children's area that was replaced by Land of the Dragons. It contained statues of dwarves and mushrooms.	Dwarf Village	
Hollywood Live on Ice	1994	1998	An ice show which included James Bond and the Rocky Horror Picture Show. This show replaced "Around the World on Ice" at the Moroccan Palace Theater.	Morocco	
Questor	1991	1998	A motion simulator ride cloned from Busch Gardens Williamsburg that revolved around guests going on an adventure with Sir Edison Fitzwilly to search for the Crystal of Zed. It was replaced in 1998 by Akbar's Adventure Tours. The ride was manufactured by Reflectone.	Crown Colony Plaza	
Veldt Monorail	1966	1999	Allowed guests to get up close with animals on the Serengeti Plain. The ride was removed due to upkeep cost. The station is now used for Cheetah Hunt, an Intamin launched roller coaster.	Crown Colony Plaza	
World Rhythms on Ice	1998	2003	A live show featuring various dancers performing acts from around the world. This show replaced "Hollywood Live on Ice" at the Moroccan Palace Theater. The show is now being considered for a re-opening at Busch Gardens Williamsburg.	Morocco	
Crazy Camel	1979	2003	A Chance Rides "Trabant" flat ride replaced by Sand Serpent.	Timbuktu (Pantopia)	
Dolphin Theatre	1986	2003	A typical animal park dolphin show.	Timbuktu (Pantopia)	
Python	1976	2006	An Arrow Dynamics designed steel corkscrew roller coaster with two inversions that opened on July 1, 1976, as Florida's first inverting coaster. The ride closed on October 31, 2006, after more than thirty years of operation. The ride was demolished throughout November 2006, with the track being scrapped. The trains, however, were sent to Busch Gardens Williamsburg for use on their Loch Ness Monster roller coaster. The new section "Jungala" has taken the place where Python once stood.	Congo	
R. L. Stine's Haunted Lighthouse 4-D	2003	2006	A 4-D movie about two children spending a night inside a haunted lighthouse. Based on a story written by author R. L. Stine. The attraction opened up in May 2003 as the first film in the newly redone Pantopia Theatre (previously Dolphin Theatre).	Timbuktu (Pantopia)	
Akbar's Adventure Tours	1998	2007	A motion simulator experience of a wacky tour of Egypt with Akbar (played by Martin Short), encountering markets, pyramids, and more. The ride opened up in May 1998 as the first family-oriented attraction (despite some scare factors) in the Egypt section. As of January 2005, the attraction was closed. In August 2007, the ride has reportedly been demolished, with anything of value going to other simulator rides in Busch-owned parks. Its location is now used as a haunted house location for the park's Halloween event, Howl-O-Scream. The ride was manufactured by Reflectone.	Egypt	
Land of the Dragons	1995	2010	A small children's area that was replaced by Sesame Street Safari of Fun. It featured rides themed to dragons and had a play area connected to a treehouse.	Sesame Street Safari of Fun	
Katonga	2004	2010	An African-themed Broadway type show. This show replaced "World Rhythms on Ice" in April 2004 at the Moroccan Palace Theater.	Morocco	
Sesame Street Presents Lights, Camera, Imagination!	2010	Before 2013	A "4-D" movie starring characters from Sesame Street. It played in the morning at the Pantopia Theater.	Timbuktu (Pantopia)	
Pirates 4D	2006	2013	A "4-D" movie about pirates, starring Leslie Nielsen. It played in the afternoon at the Pantopia Theater.	Timbuktu (Pantopia)	
Sandstorm	1980	2013	An orbiter ride with three arms that spins riders around. It was removed to make way for the Falcon's Fury drop tower.	Timbuktu (Pantopia)	
Dance to the Music	2009	Circa 2013	Visitors watch singers and dancers perform Disco era hits from the '70s.	Timbuktu (Pantopia)	
King Tut's Tomb	1996	2013	A walk through attraction that let visitors explore the replicas of King Tutankhamen's tomb. The entire attraction was converted into the ride station for Cobra's Curse.	Egypt	
Critter Castaways	2007	2014	A show featuring familiar pets and exotic creatures with almost 80 animals that was presented in the Bird Garden Theater.	Bird Gardens	
Rhino Rally	2001	2014	Riders board inside modified Land Rovers and go on an off-road African safari. Originally, the ride contained a water section where the land rovers floated down the river on a collapsed bridge. This portion of the ride closed in 2010, although the area is used as scenery for part of the Cheetah Hunt roller coaster, and Serengeti Flyer was added in this area in 2023.	Nairobi	
Gwazi	1999	2015	A 90-foot-tall (27 m) Great Coasters International dueling wooden roller coaster. It has received a #38 Golden Ticket Awards ranking. Gwazi closed in February 2015. Gwazi's trains are now used on InvadR at Busch Gardens Williamsburg, and Texas Stingray at SeaWorld San Antonio. It reopened in March 2022 as the wood-steel hybrid roller coaster Iron Gwazi.	Morocco	
Tanganyika Tidal Wave	1989	2016	A 20-passenger shoot the chutes water ride with a 55-foot (17 m) drop. Most of the theming from the African Queen Boat ride was still intact, such as the African Village. The ride's final day of operation was April 10, 2016, before it was left vacant for 2 years until its demolition in 2018 to make way for Tigris.	Stanleyville	
Iceploration	2012	2017	An ice, aerialist, acrobatics, and animal show that highlighted various parts of the world. It replaced "Katonga" at the Moroccan Palace Theater. Iceploration was replaced by Turn It Up.	Morocco	
Motor City Groove	2011	2018	The show presented classics from the Motown era at the Stanleyville Theatre.	Stanleyville	
Opening Night Critters	2014	2018	Featured animals such as dogs, cats, kangaroos, birds, and a horse. The show closed in 2019 and was replaced by Critters Inn Charge	Pantopia	
Jungle Flyers	2008	2018	Three pairs of zip lines with single-person suspended vehicles themed like hang gliders. The cables at the loading area raised and lowered to allow the vehicle to leave and then return to the station.	Jungala	
Phoenix	1984	2018	A swinging boat ride that went completely upside down. It was themed to an Egyptian cargo vessel.	Pantopia	
Sand Serpent	2004	2023	A Mack Rides Wild Mouse roller coaster. Previously operated at Busch Gardens Williamsburg from 1996 to 2003.	Pantopia	
Bush Flyers	1979	2023	A Chance Rides Red Baron that was replaced by Phoenix Rising in 2024.	Pantopia	
Turn It Up!/Turn It Up! Remix	2017 (Turn It Up), 2023 (Turn It Up: Remix)	2022 (Turn It Up), 2024 (Turn It Up: Remix)	An award-winning ice-skating show featuring ice skaters and some of today's hit pop and rock music where guests can join the party. The show was nominated by USA Today for Best Entertainment Show. Rhythm of Nature replaced Turn It Up: Remix after its last performance on March 31, 2024.	Morocco	
Scorpion	1980	2024	A steel Schwarzkopf-designed sit-down roller coaster with one vertical loop.	Pantopia	
Stanley Falls Flume	1973	2025	A log flume with a 43-foot (13 m) drop.	Stanleyville	
Kumba	1993	2026	A 143-foot-tall (44 m) Bolliger & Mabillard steel sit-down roller coaster with seven inversions. It received a #7 Golden Ticket Awards ranking.	Congo	
