= Busch Gardens =

Amusement parks in Florida and Virginia, US

- Location: Williamsburg, Virginia, U.S. (Busch Gardens Williamsburg), Tampa, Florida, U.S. (Busch Gardens Tampa Bay)
- Opened: March 31, 1959; 67 years ago (as Busch Gardens Tampa Bay); May 16, 1975; 51 years ago (as Busch Gardens Williamsburg)
- Owner: United Parks & Resorts
- Theme: Animal park
- Operating season: Year-round (Busch Gardens Williamsburg); Year-round (Busch Gardens Tampa Bay)
- Website: buschgardens.com

Busch Gardens is the name of two amusement parks in the United States, owned and operated by United Parks & Resorts. The original park is in Tampa, Florida, and the second park is in Williamsburg, Virginia. There were also previously Busch Gardens parks in Van Nuys, Los Angeles, California (1964–1979) and Houston, Texas (1971–1973). The "Busch Gardens" name was earlier used to refer to the gardens developed by Adolphus Busch near his home in Pasadena, California, which were open to the public from 1906 to 1937.

The Busch Gardens amusement park chain was initially developed as marketing vehicles for Anheuser-Busch and featured hospitality houses with samples of Anheuser-Busch products. They also included stables that housed many of the company's Clydesdale horses, which have been associated with Anheuser-Busch since 1933. Eventually, rides and attractions were added to the parks and over time were developed into full theme parks while still promoting Anheuser-Busch. Busch Entertainment Corporation, now called United Parks & Resorts, was created as a subsidiary of Anheuser-Busch Companies to run the various parks in 1959.

In 2009, AB InBev, formed from the purchase of Anheuser-Busch by InBev, sold the amusement parks to the Blackstone Group. Blackstone has kept some of the popular traditions including a stable with Clydesdales; however, the Clydesdales are not affiliated with the beer company.

== Locations ==
=== Busch Gardens Tampa Bay ===
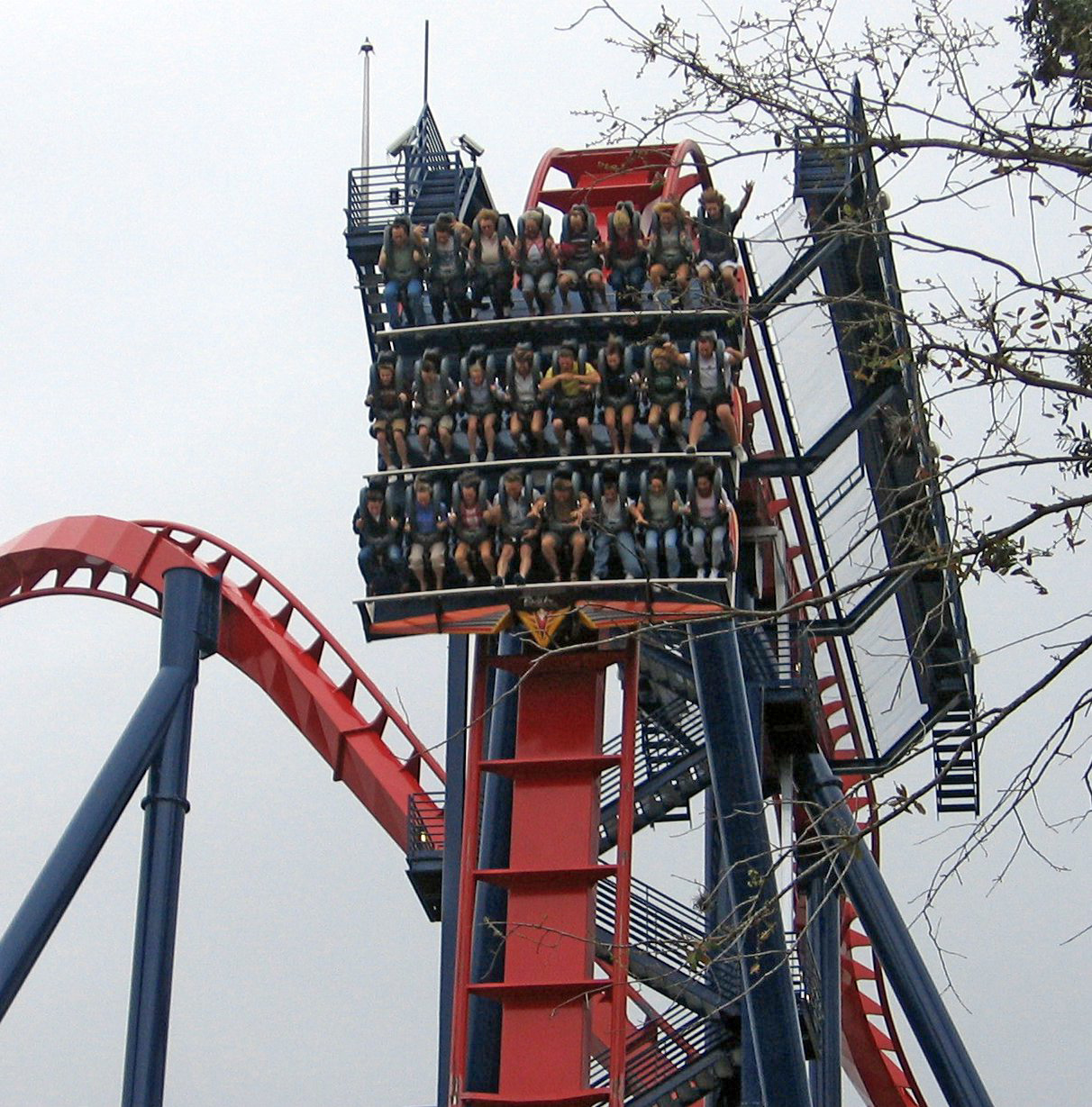
SheiKra was the first "dive machine" roller coaster in the United States.

Busch Gardens Tampa Bay opened on March 31, 1959, and has an African theme. The park was originally tagged "The Dark Continent." The theme park is one of America's largest zoological institutions, with 335 acres (136 ha) and more than 2,700 animals. Attractions include: Montu, Kumba, Scorpion, Edge of Africa, Jungala, Sand Serpent, Congo River Rapids, Saga, Tanganyika Tidal Wave, Stanley Falls, Serengeti Railway, Phoenix, Sesame Street and SheiKra, a vertical dive coaster which opened in 2005. In 2011, the park added Cheetah Hunt, a triple launch roller coaster. In 2014, the park added Falcon's Fury, an Intamin drop tower. In 2016, the park constructed Cobra's Curse, a steel roller coaster created by Mack Rides. In 2019, the park opened Tigris, a steel launched roller coaster constructed by Premier Rides. In 2022, the park opened Iron Gwazi, which is a hybrid conversion of Gwazi by Rocky Mountain Construction. The park is some distance away from downtown, in central Tampa, near the limits of the city of Temple Terrace to the east of Tampa.

=== Busch Gardens Williamsburg ===
Busch Gardens Williamsburg opened May 16, 1975. With its European theme, the park was originally tagged "The Old Country." Attractions at this park include Alpengeist, Escape from Pompeii, Apollo's Chariot, Loch Ness Monster and Griffon. Added in 2007, the Griffon coaster had bragging rights as the tallest dive coaster in the United States. The park is divided into seven sections, each themed to a different European country. On July 25, 2009, Busch Gardens announced that the Big Bad Wolf roller coaster would be retired September 7, 2009, after 25 years of operation due to its "meeting the end of its service life". and was replaced with Verbolten - a New Multiple Launch Coaster that opened in 2012. Newly added in 2009 was Christmas Town, A Busch Gardens Celebration, with many themed holiday attractions and shows with eight million lights and a 50-foot Light Animated Christmas Tree. Also in 2010, the 3-D ride Corkscrew Hill was replaced by Europe in the Air, which itself was replaced by a new VR action ride called Battle for Eire in 2018. Also new for 2010 was illumiNights: A Busch Garden Encore, with many mini nightly country shows and nightly fireworks set to a special soundtrack which is available during the special event in many gift shops. In 2010, Busch Gardens announced a drop tower called the Mäch Tower which was set to open in late spring 2011 but was delayed due to train problems from Italy and opened in August 2011. It was announced in late 2022 that the tower was to give its final rides on January 8, 2023. The ride closed permanently on that same day. Tempesto opened in May 2015, as it was part of an addition to the park's Italy section. InvadR, the first ever wooden coaster at Busch Gardens, opened in 2017. Pantheon opened March 25, 2022. Now operates year-round as of 2021.

== Former parks ==
=== Busch Gardens in California ===
==== Pasadena (1906–1937) ====
Long before the current Busch Gardens amusement parks, the name referred to the personal gardens of Adolphus Busch, co-founder of Anheuser-Busch. After becoming wealthy in the beer business, Busch purchased a winter home in Pasadena, California. He landscaped the 36 acres (15 ha) around his home with thousands of plants, as well as statues, waterfalls and walking paths. He opened these "Busch Gardens" to the public in 1906. The gardens became a major tourist attraction, even after Busch's death in 1913 and prompted the Pacific Electric Railway to establish a stop for the gardens' visitors. The nearby Hollywood film industry used the gardens in many films, including Frankenstein (1931), Dr. Jekyll and Mr. Hyde (1931), The Adventures of Robin Hood (archery scene, 1938), and Gone With the Wind (Twelve Oaks barbecue, 1939). Busch's widow offered the gardens to the city of Pasadena on multiple occasions for use as a public park, but the city never accepted the offer. Busch Gardens closed in 1937 and the land was later subdivided. The area is now a residential neighborhood, though some of the landscape features of the Busch Gardens era remain.

==== Van Nuys (1966–1979) ====
In 1954, a new brewery was opened in Van Nuys. The company opened one of the modern Busch Gardens parks at this site in 1966 that included boat rides, a 10-minute monorail tour of the brewery, and free beer. (Circa 1974, there was a second monorail "which passes through an enormous aviary".) The park expanded by 5 acres (2.0 ha) in 1972 to a total of 22 acres (8.9 ha). "The new section includes an exciting barrel flume ride; a huge, walk-through flight cage; a magic show; a special show place for otters; penguin and sea lion programs; and an individual boat ride popular with young skippers." The 17-acre (6.9 ha) amusement park was renamed Busch Bird Sanctuary in 1977 and closed in 1979. The birds were moved to the nearby Los Angeles Zoo and the Busch Gardens Tampa Bay and Williamsburg locations. The site of the Van Nuys theme park is currently a Bud Light facility and one of the remnants of the park is the footbridge connecting to the 1972 expansion.

=== Busch Gardens Houston ===
Houston's Busch Gardens opened in May 1971 and was closed within a few years. It was located adjacent to the Anheuser-Busch brewery, which opened in 1966. The 40-acre (16 ha) park had an Asian theme except for an ice cave with a temperature controlled environment for several varieties of penguins, polar bears and sea lions. It also had its own 2 ft (610 mm) narrow gauge railway.

=== Catalonia, Spain ===
Anheuser-Busch and Grand Tibidabo, S.A., owners of Tibidabo Amusement Park, in Barcelona, along with other Spanish investors, made plans to build a Tibi Gardens outside of Barcelona, Spain, in the late 1980s. During construction, several of the Spanish investors backed out, and investors from The Tussauds Group stepped in. The park was renamed Port Aventura and when it opened in 1995 in Salou, Spain, Anheuser Busch had a 20% investment in the park while The Tussauds Group had 40%. In 1998 the majority of Tussauds Group's shares in the park were sold to Universal.

== Unbuilt parks ==
=== Busch Gardens Dubai ===
In 2008, Busch Entertainment Corporation announced plans to open a new park in Dubai, United Arab Emirates in 2012. It was going to be placed on a man-made island shaped like Shamu in Dubai with SeaWorld, Discovery Cove and Aquatica also being built on that island. The Dubai park would have added on a third park to the Busch Gardens brand. The plans have been shelved because of financial issues. On February 4, 2009, Busch Entertainment announced that the Dubai plans had been canceled due to the global recession.

== Free beer samples ==
After InBev sold the amusement parks in 2009 to Blackstone, many beer-affiliated traditions ended, including the tradition of offering free beer samples in their Hospitality Centers, and Brewmaster Clubs would come to an end in the parks. Also announced was that workers would not get two cases of beer a month for free, which they would receive under old parent Anheuser-Busch. Busch Gardens Tampa Bay has again begun offering free samples in conjunction with limited-time promotions, most recently in 2019 as part of the park's year-long 60th anniversary celebration. Each guest may sample two seven-ounce servings of beer.

== See also ==
- Incidents at United Parks & Resorts

Other parks owned by United Parks & Resorts:

- The SeaWorld parks in San Diego, California, San Antonio, Texas and Orlando, Florida.
  - SeaWorld Orlando
  - SeaWorld San Diego
  - SeaWorld San Antonio
  - SeaWorld Ohio, a fourth SeaWorld formerly operated near Cleveland, Ohio
- Sesame Place, a pair of children's theme parks themed to the series Sesame Street
  - Sesame Place Philadelphia
  - Sesame Place San Diego
- Water parks:
  - Adventure Island, Tampa, Florida;
  - Water Country USA in Williamsburg, Virginia;
  - Aquatica Florida in Orlando, Florida
  - Aquatica in San Antonio, Texas
- Discovery Cove, an exclusive, reservation-only park in Orlando
- Grant's Farm, an animal reserve park in St. Louis, Missouri, on land formerly owned by Ulysses S. Grant; home to some of the Budweiser Clydesdales
