= Phoenix Rising (roller coaster) =

Ride at Busch Gardens Tampa Bay

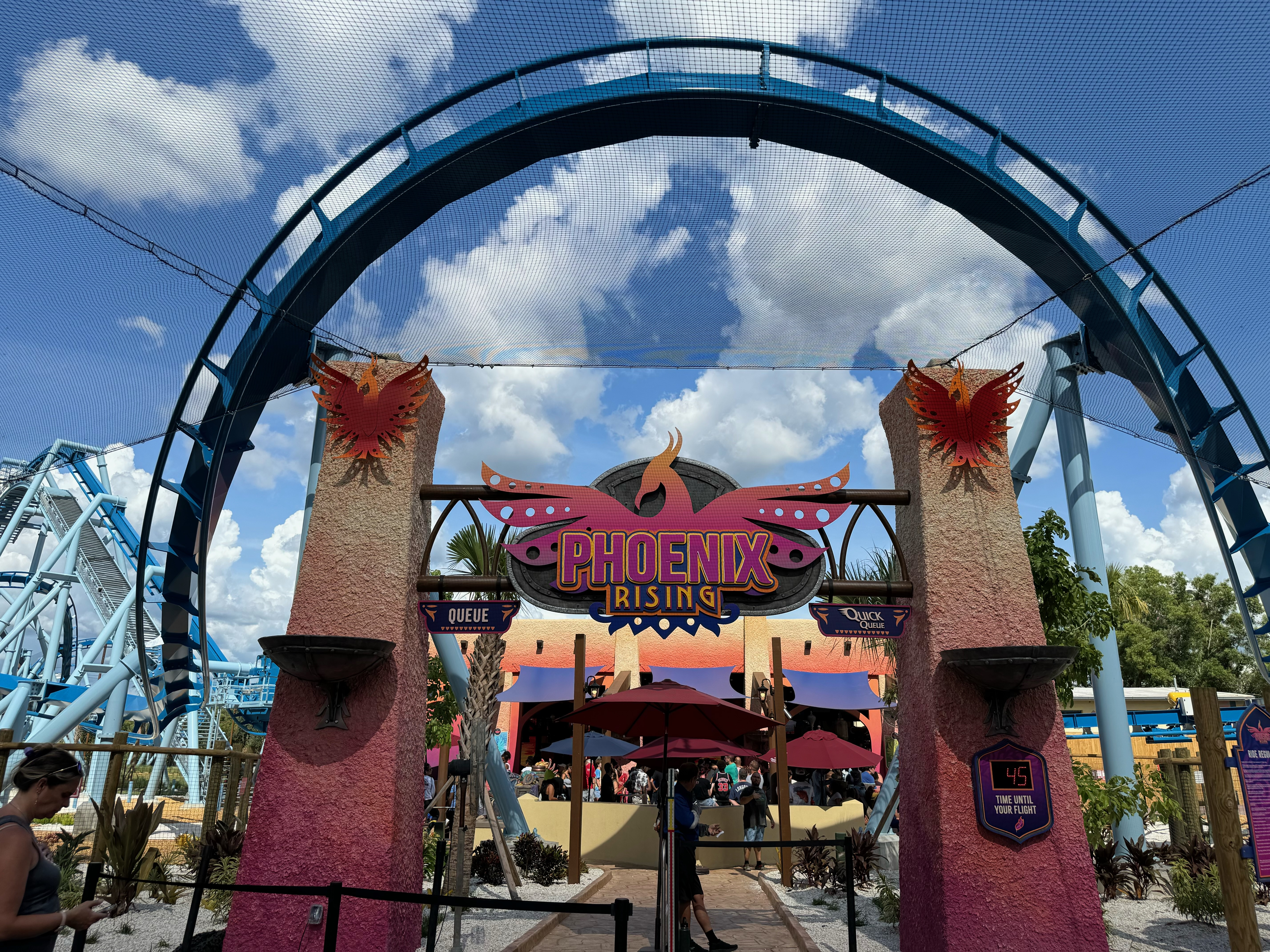
- View of Phoenix Rising from its façade

Busch Gardens Tampa Bay
- Location: Busch Gardens Tampa Bay
- Park section: Pantopia
- Coordinates: 28°02′18.67″N 82°25′20.58″W
- Status: Operating
- Opening date: July 21, 2024
- Replaced: Sand Serpent

General statistics
- Type: Steel – Inverted
- Manufacturer: Bolliger & Mabillard
- Model: Family Inverted Coaster
- Lift/launch system: Chain lift hill
- Height: 80 ft (24 m)
- Length: 1,831 ft (558 m)
- Speed: 44 mph (71 km/h)
- Inversions: 0
- Duration: 1:26
- Height restriction: 42 in (107 cm)
- Trains: Single train with 10 cars; riders arranged 2 across in a single row for a total of 20 riders per train
- Quick Queue available
- Phoenix Rising at RCDB

Phoenix Rising is a family inverted roller coaster at Busch Gardens Tampa Bay in Tampa, Florida, United States. The roller coaster was manufactured by Bolliger & Mabillard and opened on July 21, 2024, as the park's tenth roller coaster. Phoenix Rising mimics the sensation of the legendary phoenix taking flight. The roller coaster reaches a height of 80 feet (24 m), and has a maximum speed of 44 mph (71 km/h) during a 1-minute 26-second duration.

Phoenix Rising is located in the Pantopia section of the park next to Falcon's Fury, Carousel Caravan, and Scorpion before its closure in September 2024. The train contains on-board audio with echoing “caws” being heard during the experience, with four distinct thematic options, each representing a different phoenix. It opened as the most recent expansion and attraction at Busch Gardens Tampa Bay.

== History ==
Planning for Phoenix Rising began in early 2022, with the aim of designing a family-friendly roller coaster that would stand out in the park's lineup. Construction officially began in late 2023, with the installation of the first support beams and track sections.

The ride occupies the land formerly used by the Sand Serpent wild mouse coaster and the Phoenix looping starship. The construction process involved significant groundwork, including the installation of concrete footers and foundations. By early 2024, the ride's track and support structures were completed, and testing began shortly thereafter.

USA Today described the ride as one of the most anticipated roller coasters of 2024. On July 17, 2024, Phoenix Rising opened up to passholders and media members. The ride opened to the general public on July 21, 2024.

== Characteristics ==
The 1,831-foot-long (558m) Phoenix Rising stands as North America's tallest and longest inverted family coaster. The ride features a series of twists, turns, an over-banked curve, and drops over the Serengeti Plain. Riders must be at least 42 inches (107 cm) tall. Stewart Clark, Park President of Busch Gardens Tampa Bay, stated, "With a height requirement of just 42 inches, it’s an adventure the whole family can enjoy together". The ride operates with a single train, containing 10 cars, with each car seating 2 riders in a single row for a total of 20 riders per train.

Three screens in the dispatch station display an animated phoenix which flies around before the coaster starts. The animated phoenix is different each time and matches the different colors from the banners in the queue. One of four animated phoenixes are selected randomly: Terra (protector of the rainforests), Ignis (protector of the desert realm), Glacius (protector of the mountaintops and glaciers), and Aqua (protector of the ocean realm). A different on-ride soundtrack is played based on which phoenix is selected.

== Ride experience ==
=== Queue ===
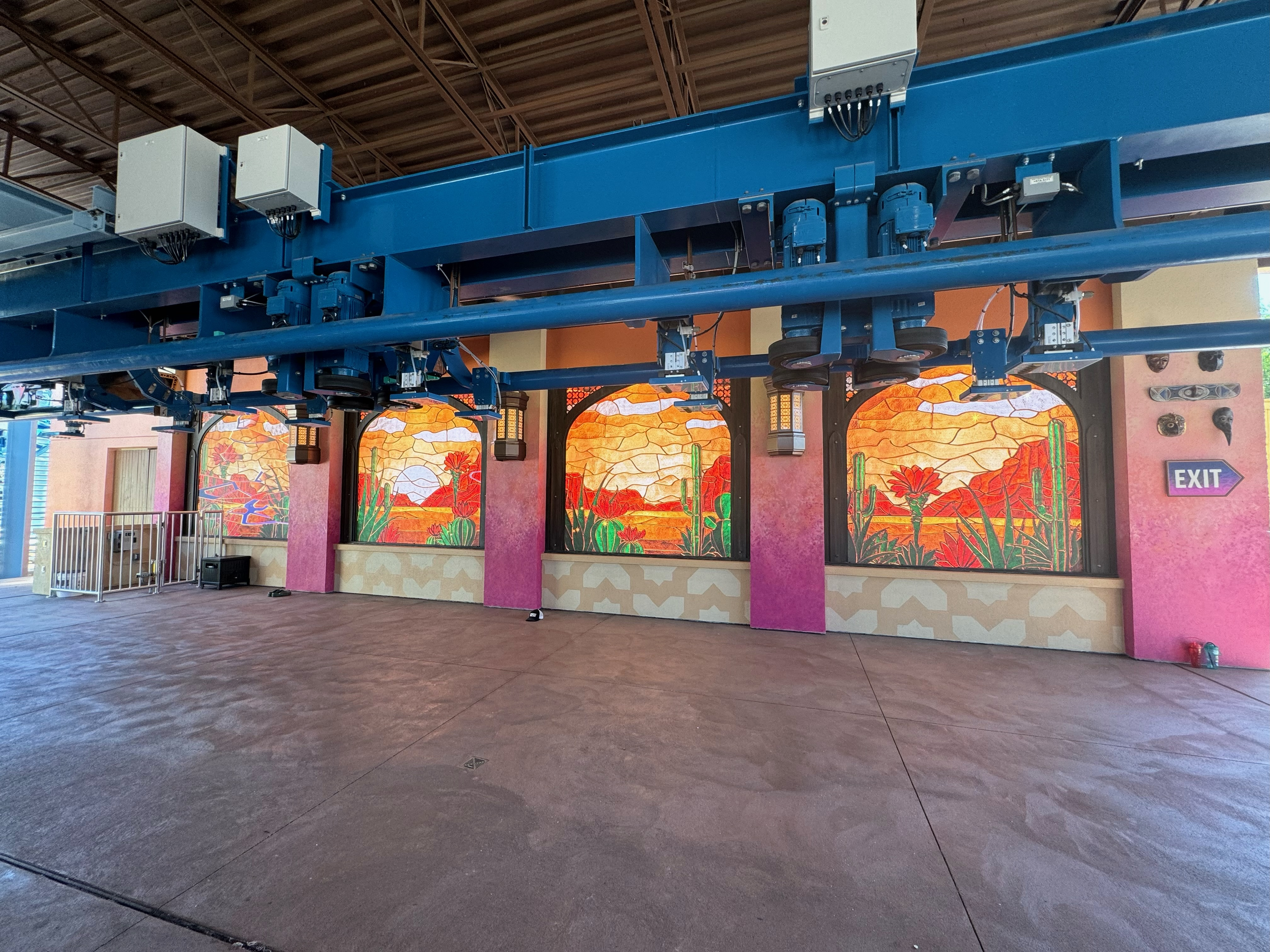
Queue of Phoenix Rising displaying LED screens

Guests enter the vibrant area of Pantopia, where the queue takes place. The queue begins with an outdoor area featuring switchbacks and a viewing area of the ride. Guests then navigate through a themed corridor adorned with murals depicting the legend of the phoenix. The dispatch station contains three LED screens to the right of the train, which display an animated phoenix flying around before the coaster starts. The animated phoenix is different each time and matches the different colors from the banners in the queue.

=== Layout ===
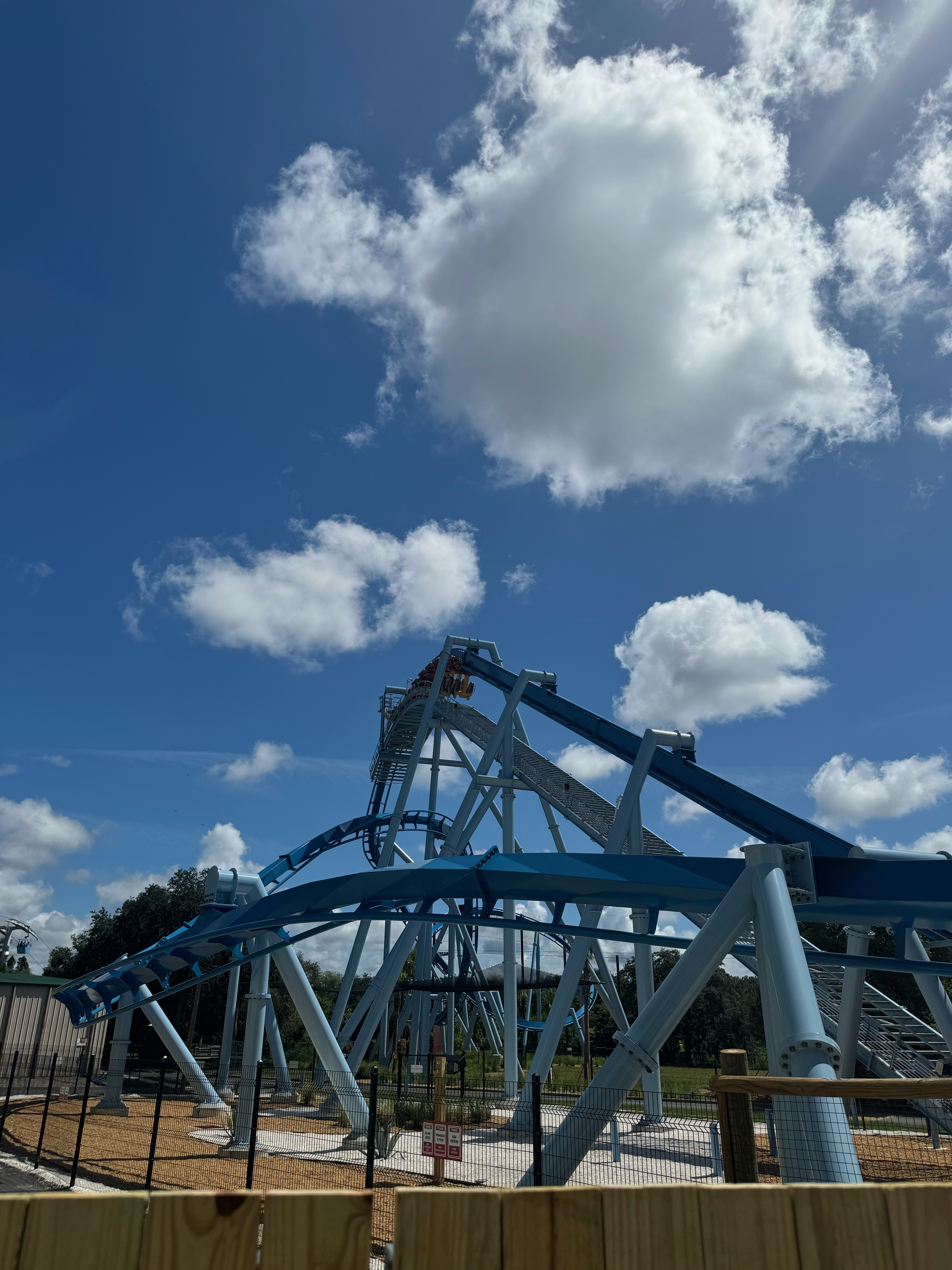
Phoenix Rising's chain lift hill

The train leaves the station with a small right-handed turn, tracking towards the chain lift hill. Once at the top, the ride dives down into a twisted drop. Riders experience a series of additional twists and turns before the ride takes an over-banked curve that brings riders close to flipping upside down above the ride's entrance sign. The ride sharply swings right for several beats, then swings left for another few beats before returning to the loading dispatch station. On-ride speakers allow riders to hear the flaps of a phoenix's wings. Phoenix Rising at Busch Gardens Tampa Bay features no full inversions, consistent with the family-friendly coaster theme.

== Reception ==
When Phoenix Rising opened, a critic for Attractions Magazine wrote that the ride paled in comparison to some of Busch Gardens Tampa Bay's larger roller coasters. Nonetheless, the critic wrote, "Though many of us desire the tallest, fastest, most thrilling attraction, theme parks need to be more than that. Phoenix Rising accomplishes this goal." The Tampa Bay Times wrote that "Phoenix Rising is a big kid initiation coaster of sorts."

== See also ==
- Montu, another inverted roller coaster located at Busch Gardens Tampa Bay
