= Python (Busch Gardens Tampa Bay) =

Ride at Busch Gardens Tampa Bay (1976–2006)

- Previously known as The Python
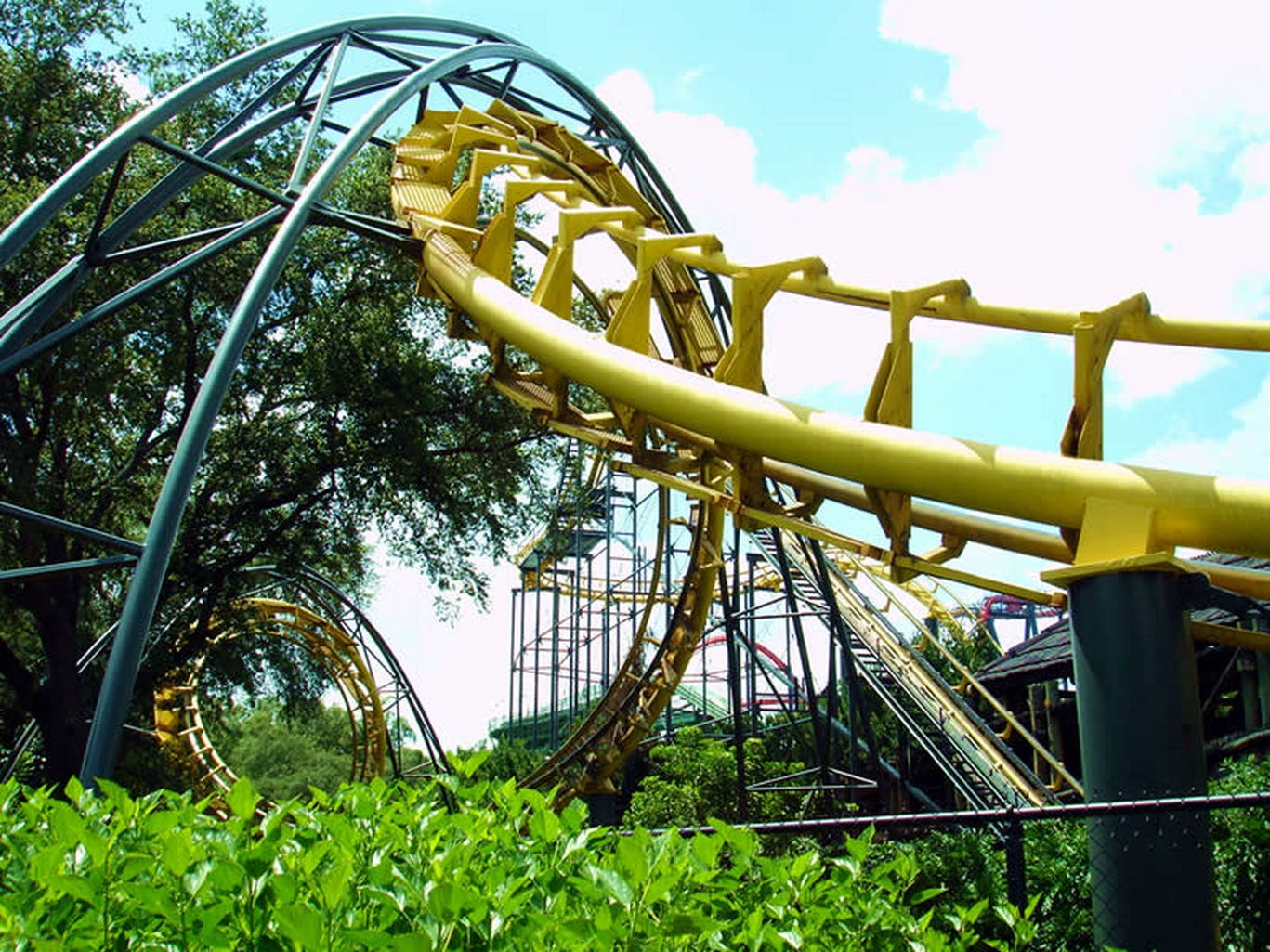
- Python's double-corkscrew element (chain lift and first drop in background)

Busch Gardens Tampa Bay
- Location: Busch Gardens Tampa Bay
- Park section: Congo
- Coordinates: 28.0390°N 82.4251°W
- Status: Removed
- Opening date: July 1, 1976
- Closing date: October 31, 2006
- Cost: US$2 million ($11.3 million in 2025 dollars)
- Replaced by: Jungala

General statistics
- Type: Steel
- Manufacturer: Arrow Development
- Designer: Ron Toomer
- Model: Corkscrew
- Lift/launch system: Chain lift hill
- Height: 72 ft (22 m)
- Length: 1,200 ft (370 m)
- Speed: 40 mph (64 km/h)
- Inversions: 2
- Duration: 1:08
- Height restriction: 42 in (107 cm)
- Python at RCDB

Python was a steel roller coaster located at Busch Gardens Tampa Bay theme park in Tampa, Florida. Built by Arrow Development and opened on July 1, 1976, it was the first roller coaster at Busch Gardens since the park opened in 1959. The roller coaster was located in the Congo section of the park near Stanley Falls Flume and later the Congo River Rapids. After 30 years of operation, Python closed on October 31, 2006, and was eventually replaced by Jungala, a family section of the park.

Python was one of several Corkscrew models built by Arrow Development, imaged after the likes of Corkscrew at Knott's Berry Farm. The roller coaster reached a maximum height of 72 feet (22 m), with a maximum speed of 40 miles per hour (64 km/h), and reached a length of 1,200 feet (370 m). Upon opening, the roller coaster was received well by critics and guests.

== History ==
Following an 18 month expansion of the Busch Gardens Tampa park, which saw the opening of several attractions including the Skyride and Moroccan Village, officials from the company disclosed about planning out the next 18 months of a separate expansion. Reports a day before its formal announcement in September 1975 indicated that a new thrill ride, named "The Python", would be constructed. On September 25, 1975, Busch Gardens announced the construction of Python, a roller coaster that was promoted to reach speeds of 50 miles per hour (80 km/h) and have a 50-foot-tall (15 m) drop. The roller coaster would cost $2 million as part of a $7.6 million expansion of the park, and was expected to open by the 1976 summer season. In October 1975, the general manager of Busch Gardens Tampa, William Thurman, expected the expansion to be approved by the city of Tampa due to the recent success seen at the Busch Gardens parks.

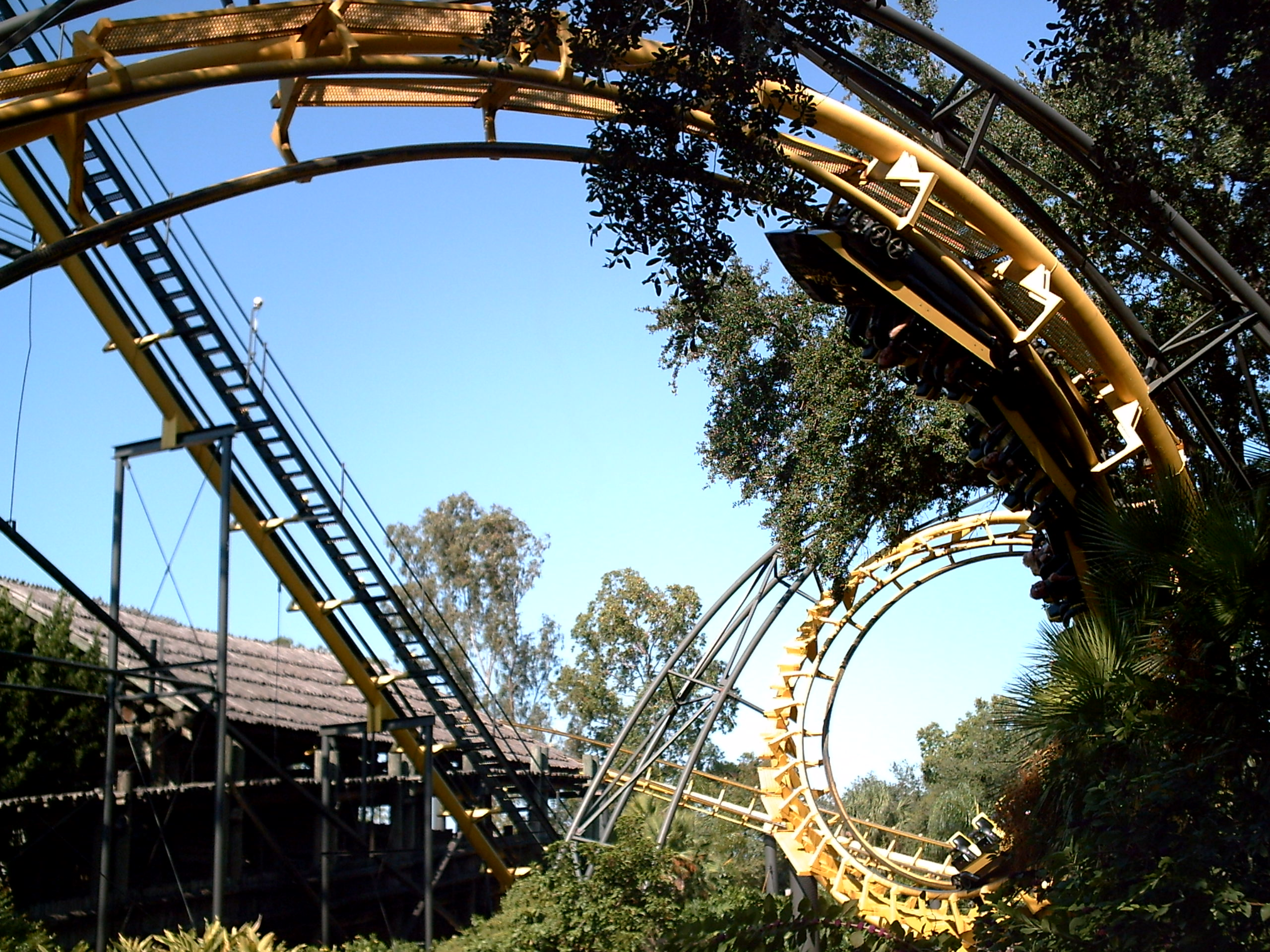
Python entering its second corkscrew

In January 1976, Thom Stork, the publicity manager for Busch Gardens Tampa, voiced the expansion that included Python would appeal to all ages and carry "the balance we think we need" for the park. By March 1976, it was observed in The Tampa Tribune that materials and plans were being looked over during a visit by the Syrian Ministry of Tourism. Vertical construction was observed to continue between April and May 1976. In the same time frame of its reported construction, it was stated that Python would open in mid-June. Python opened on July 1, 1976, as the first roller coaster at Busch Gardens Tampa. Upon opening, Python became Florida's first roller coaster to feature inversions.

Rumors of Python closing began in September 2006, as Busch Gardens filed permits to demolish the corner of the Congo section which hosted the roller coaster. The replacement for the roller coaster was further speculated to be part of an 164,000 square feet (15,200 m^{2}) expansion to the Congo section. The original permit for demolishing the section of the park was turned down by city officials wanting a more in-depth plan. On October 28, 2006, the park announced that Python would not reopen for the 2007 season. The ride permanently closed on October 31, 2006, and was removed after 30 years of operation. Along with Python, the area's restaurant were torn down as a part of the Congo renovation. After the demolition of Python, the trains were sent to Busch Gardens Williamsburg for their Arrow Development roller coaster, Loch Ness Monster. Approval for the new section of the park took place on June 14, 2007, which would become Jungala, and later opened on April 5, 2008.

== Characteristics ==
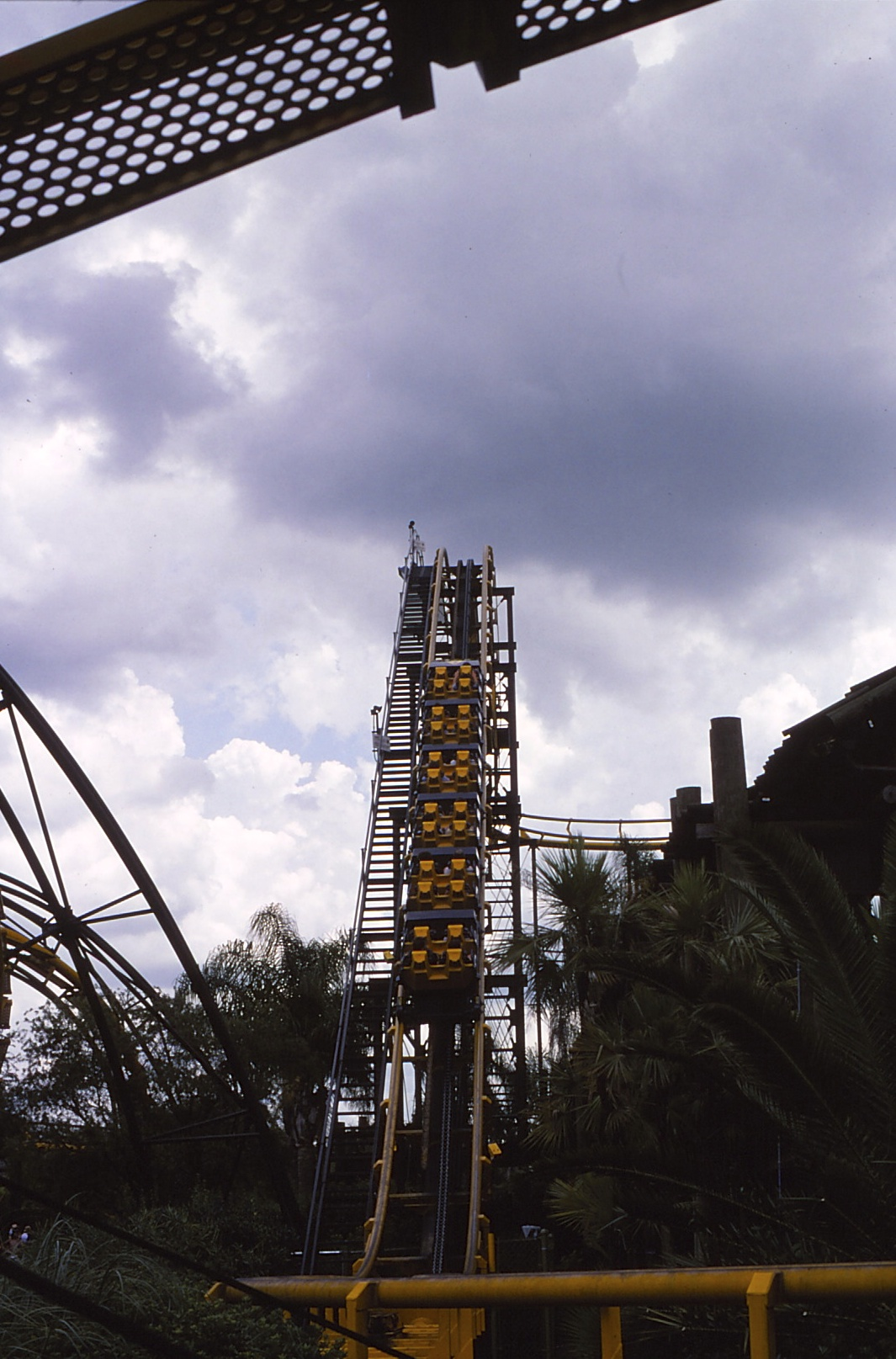
Python in 1982

Python was a stock model roller coaster made by Arrow Development, which was a clone of Knott's Berry Farms defunct Corkscrew roller coaster (which now operates at Silverwood amusement park in Athol, Idaho). The concept for the Corkscrew model took six years for Arrow Development to progress, and was designed by Ron Toomer.

Python opened as part of an expansion by the park featuring another attraction in the Congo area named "The Monstrous Mamba". The roller coaster reached a length of 1,200 feet (370 m), with the original track painted a bright yellow and brown, later having a black and yellow color scheme. Python operated with two trains, with six cars that were arranged two across in two rows seating, allowing for twenty-four riders per train. The trains were colored black and yellow, as the roller coaster was themed to the python snake. The trains featured over-the-head restraints, with riders needing to be 42 inches to ride.

=== Ride experience ===
The train exited the station into a short 180-degree turn to the right and up the 72-foot-tall (22 m) lift hill. Once at the top, the train dipped into a banked turn to the right and descended down into the first drop. As the train descends, it reached its maximum speed of 40 miles per hour (64 km/h). Following the drop, the train then ascended a small right-banked hill and into a turn, followed by its double corkscrew element. After the signature double corkscrew element, the train then went through another 180-degree turn to the right, and entered the final brake run where it returned to the station. One cycle of the roller coaster took about a minute to complete.

== Incidents ==
A few weeks after the ride opened, a 39-year-old heart patient died shortly after riding Python. The roller coaster's tagline ("I challenged the Python and lived!") was subsequently removed.

== Reception and legacy ==
Python garnered positive reviews from guests and critics upon opening. Guests reactions to the ride ranged from excited to afraid, with one guest simply stating "it's a scream" and another calling it "dyn-o-mite!" A staff writer for The Tampa Tribune, Lisa Akchin, stated during her first ride she "had been too scared to scream", but during the third ride, she "was actually enjoying [her]self". By the time she left the roller coaster, she expressed "feeling a little unsteady on [her] feet but exhilarated." A staff member from the St. Petersburg Times, Michael Marzella, framed Python as "more than just a run-of-the-mill daredevil roller coaster" and that it "sends you speeding down at a breathtaking clip." In the same article, Marzella conversed with John C. Allen, a roller coaster designer who explained "every twist, bend and stomach-wrench is carefully designed to create an illusion of danger" and "if you emerge laughing, then the magic worked."

After the opening of Python at Busch Gardens Tampa, attendance for the park increased 12.6% during July 1976 compared to July 1975. The roller coaster's opening was attributed as one of the main factors to the overall 2.5% increase in total attendance for the 1976 season. In the ensuing years of its operation, Python led the way for Busch Gardens Tampa to construct several additional roller coasters at the park.

== See also ==
- Canobie Corkscrew, another Corkscrew model manufactured by Arrow Development
- Wabash Cannonball (roller coaster), another Corkscrew model manufactured by Arrow Development
