= Scorpion (roller coaster) =

Ride at Busch Gardens Tampa Bay (1980-2024)

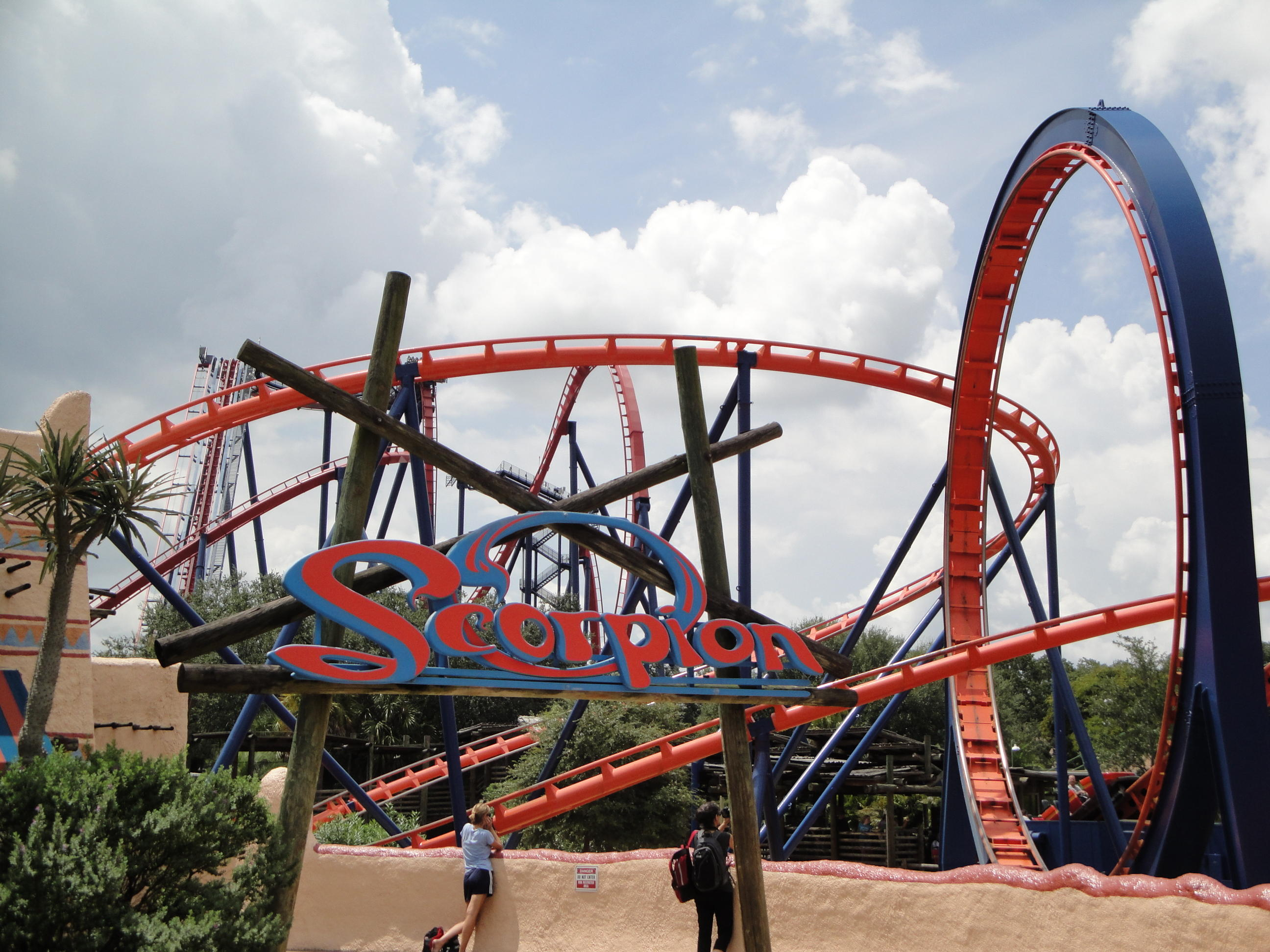
- Scorpion seen within the Pantopia section with SheiKra in the background

Busch Gardens Tampa Bay
- Location: Busch Gardens Tampa Bay
- Park section: Pantopia
- Coordinates: 28°02′15″N 82°25′24″W
- Status: Removed
- Opening date: May 16, 1980
- Closing date: September 8, 2024
- Cost: US$2.5 million – US$3 million

General statistics
- Type: Steel
- Manufacturer: Anton Schwarzkopf
- Designer: Werner Stengel
- Model: Silver Arrow
- Lift/launch system: Chain lift hill
- Height: 60.7 ft (18.5 m)
- Length: 1,817.6 ft (554.0 m)
- Speed: 41 mph (66 km/h)
- Inversions: 1
- Duration: 1:30
- G-force: 3.5
- Height restriction: 48 in (122 cm)
- Trains: 2 trains with 5 cars; riders arranged 2 across in 2 rows for a total of 20 riders per train
- Quick Queue was available
- Scorpion at RCDB

Scorpion was a steel roller coaster at Busch Gardens Tampa Bay in Tampa, Florida. Designed by Anton Schwarzkopf and manufactured by Werner Stengel, it opened on May 16, 1980, as the second roller coaster at the park. The roller coaster was added as part of the newly constructed Timbuktu section during the second-phase opening, being surrounded by the Congo and Nairobi sections. The roller coaster reached a maximum height of 60.7 feet (18.5 m), with a maximum speed of 41 miles per hour (66 km/h), and a total length of 1,817.6 feet (554.0 m).

Scorpion was one of three Silver Arrow models produced by Anton Schwarzkopf, being the only one supported on a permanent structure. Upon opening, the roller coaster received generally positive reviews, and with the closure of Python in 2006, Scorpion became the oldest operating roller coaster at Busch Gardens Tampa Bay until its closure in 2024.

== History ==
Soon after the expansion of the Congo section of the park, which saw the opening of Python in the 1976 season, it was announced on May 9, 1978, by Anheuser-Busch (the initial owner of Busch Gardens Tampa) that another expansion would come to the park. The expansion was reported to begin soon after its approval, with site preparation to take place first, and cost between $5 million and $10 million. Construction of the area entitled "Timbuktu" that would encompass the latter roller coaster was observed by The Tampa Tribune in November 1978.

Anheuser-Busch announced a $12.3 million expansion to its Busch Gardens Tampa park for a new section named Timbuktu on February 5, 1979. The 7-acre (2.8 ha) addition would see the construction of several attractions, including a roller coaster entitled "Scorpion" which was described as "a European designed roller coaster with a 360-degree-loop". The Timbuktu expansion would open in two phases, with the Scorpion roller coaster to open as part of the latter half at a later date. The original opening date was reported to be in December 1979, though, was moved back several times.

The Timbuktu section of the park opened to guests on January 25, 1980. Construction of Scorpion was observed by the Orlando Sentinel in March 1980, with an opening that was due in May 1980. On May 16, 1980, Scorpion opened as the park's second roller coaster. In 2004, Scorpion was repainted from its original paint scheme of orange track and black supports to red track with blue supports (a paint scheme similar to SheiKra). The roller coaster was most recently situated in the Pantopia section of the park next to Phoenix Rising, which was introduced to replace the Timbuktu section with the opening of the park's drop-tower, Falcon's Fury.

On August 23, 2024, Busch Gardens announced that Scorpion would permanently close on September 2 after 44 years in service. Busch Gardens announced that the ride would be replaced by another attraction; no details of which were revealed at the time. Due to public criticism over the abrupt closure, the park postponed the final operating day of Scorpion by one week to September 8. The roller coaster was demolished in May 2025.

== Ride experience ==
The train exited the station forward and ascended the 60.7 feet (18.5 m) lift hill. Once at the top, the train made a slight right turn before it descended into a banked drop and reached its maximum speed of 41 miles per hour (66 km/h). Following the drop, the trains entered the roller coaster's signature 39.3 foot (12.0 m) vertical loop before it exited into a banked left turn and ascended a hill. After cresting the ascent, the trains continued left into a banked drop in its sustained turn before it straightened out and ascended into a small hill going through the vertical loop. After it traversed through the middle of the loop, the train then entered a continuous series of downward spiraling helixes banked to the right before it exited and straightened out into the final brake run. The train then traveled forward into a right turn on the outside of the layout, going into straight track before it made another right turn into the station. One cycle of the roller coaster took about a minute and a half to complete.

== Characteristics ==
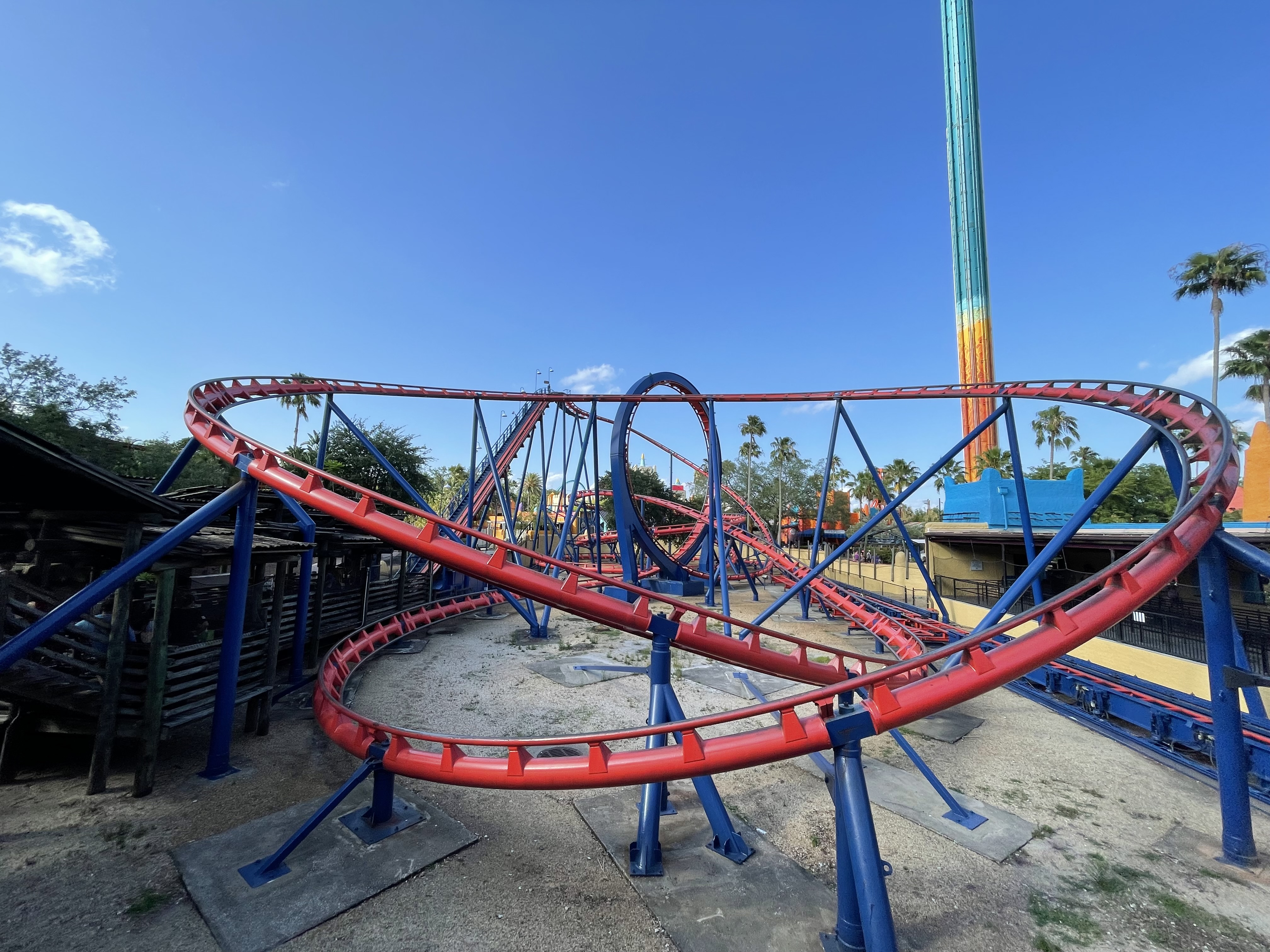
Scorpion from the queue line and Falcon's Fury in the background

The roller coaster was manufactured by Anton Schwarzkopf and designed by Werner Stengel. The total cost of construction for the roller coaster ranged from $2.5 million to $3 million. Scorpion was one of three Silver Arrow model roller coasters that were produced by Schwarzkopf, which includes Big Blue located at Fun Park Biograd in Biograd na Moru, Croatia, and the other known as Looping Star owned by the Rand Show in Johannesburg, South Africa. Scorpion had a permanent support structure, as opposed to the other Silver Arrow models being portable units.

Scorpion's track reached a total length of 1,817.6 feet (554.0 m), and is encompassed in a 93.5 foot (28.5 m) by 213.8 foot (65.2 m) area. Scorpion exerted a maximum of 3.5 g-forces to its riders, and was named after the general species of scorpion. The roller coaster initially featured six-car trains that operated the layout. Scorpion operated with two trains, with five cars per train, each car was arranged two-seats across in two rows allowing for a maximum capacity of twenty riders per train. Originally the trains featured a red and orange color scheme, with the iteration at its closure featuring a red, orange, and yellow color scheme. The ride featured a lap bar restraint, accompanied by a rider height restriction of 48 inches (120 cm).

== Incidents ==
In December 1994, the roller coaster was part of a lawsuit filed against the park that alleged a model who was employed to portray a family figure for the park's promotional material was not allowed to disembark from the roller coaster after voicing discomfort. The lawsuit alleged the park was liable for false imprisonment and negligence and sought $15,000 in damages as a result of the model's injuries as she was forced to continue riding the roller coaster several times thereafter without a break. The lawsuit was later dismissed by the judge in 1997. (Note: Judy A. Parker vs. Busch Entertainment Cor, Dismissed (Thirteenth Judicial Circuit Court of Florida 1994).)

== Reception and legacy ==
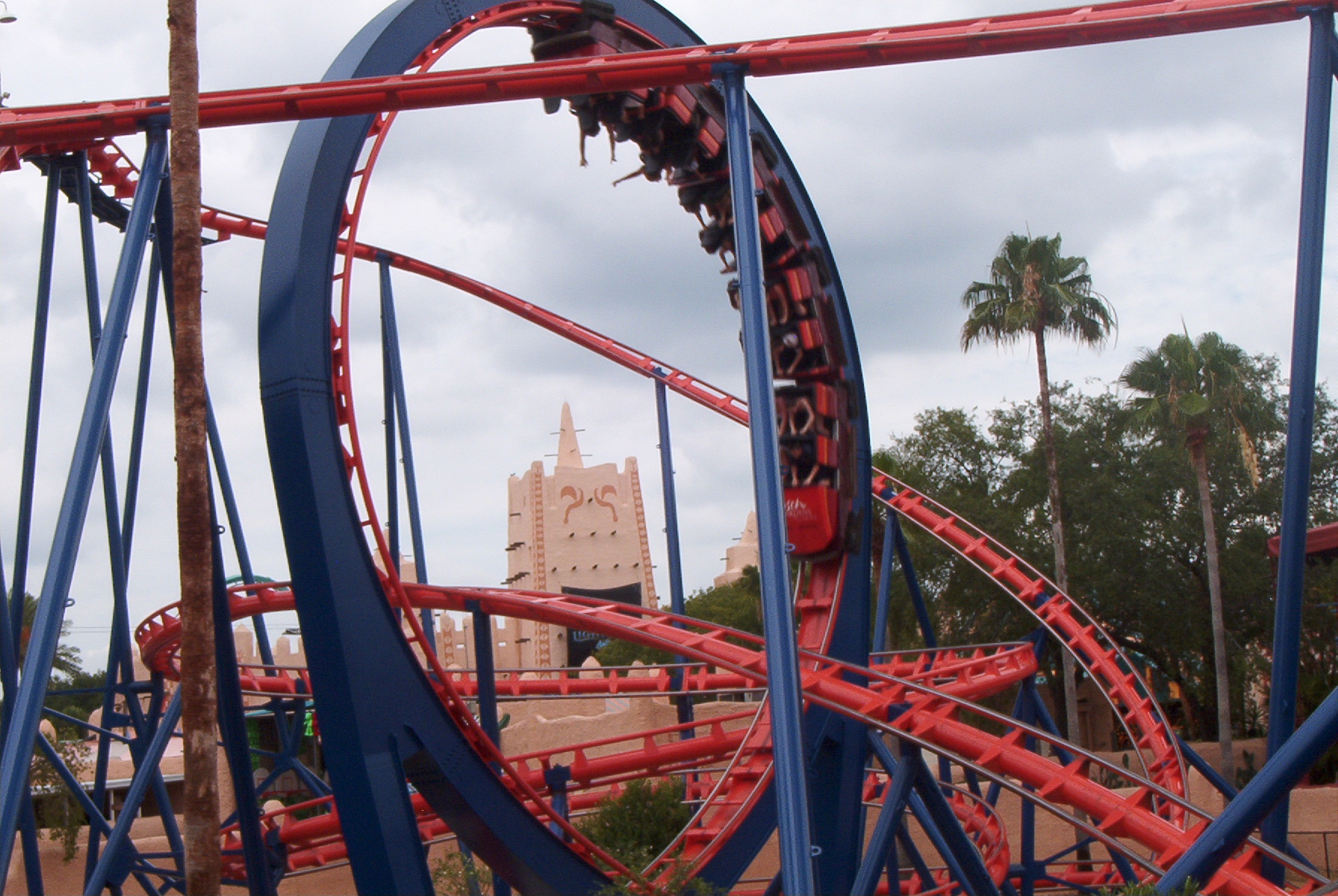
Scorpion as it descends out of the vertical loop element

Upon opening at the park, Scorpion received generally positive reviews. Guests' reaction to the roller coaster was received well, with one group simply stating "it's a thrill." A staff writer for The Tampa Times, Dale Wilson, stated that "Scorpion looks scarier than it is," but compared the thrill of the first drop to the gliding action of a bird. Though not his favorite, as the layout was "too predictable", Wilson commented that "it'll shake you till your teeth rattle" if not holding onto the ride. A writer for the Philadelphia Daily News, Michael Knight, observed that the ride "looks like it might be the ultimate roller-coaster heart stopper." Randy Geisler, the former American Coaster Enthusiasts (ACE) president, commented that Scorpion was an intense ride and praised "how much excitement a designer can cram" within the ride's duration.

As the second roller coaster to open at the park, it was often compared to sister steel roller coaster, Python, with various preferences towards either. At the time of Scorpion's closure, it was the park's oldest and longest-standing roller coaster, as Python had closed during the 2006 season.

== See also ==
- Sand Serpent, another roller coaster that was situated within the Pantopia section of the park, previously part of the Timbuktu section
