= Sand Serpent =

Ride at Busch Gardens parks (1996–2011)

- Previously known as Wild Izzy (1996) and Wild Maus (1997–2003) at Busch Gardens Williamsburg; Cheetah Chase (2004–2011) at Busch Gardens Tampa Bay
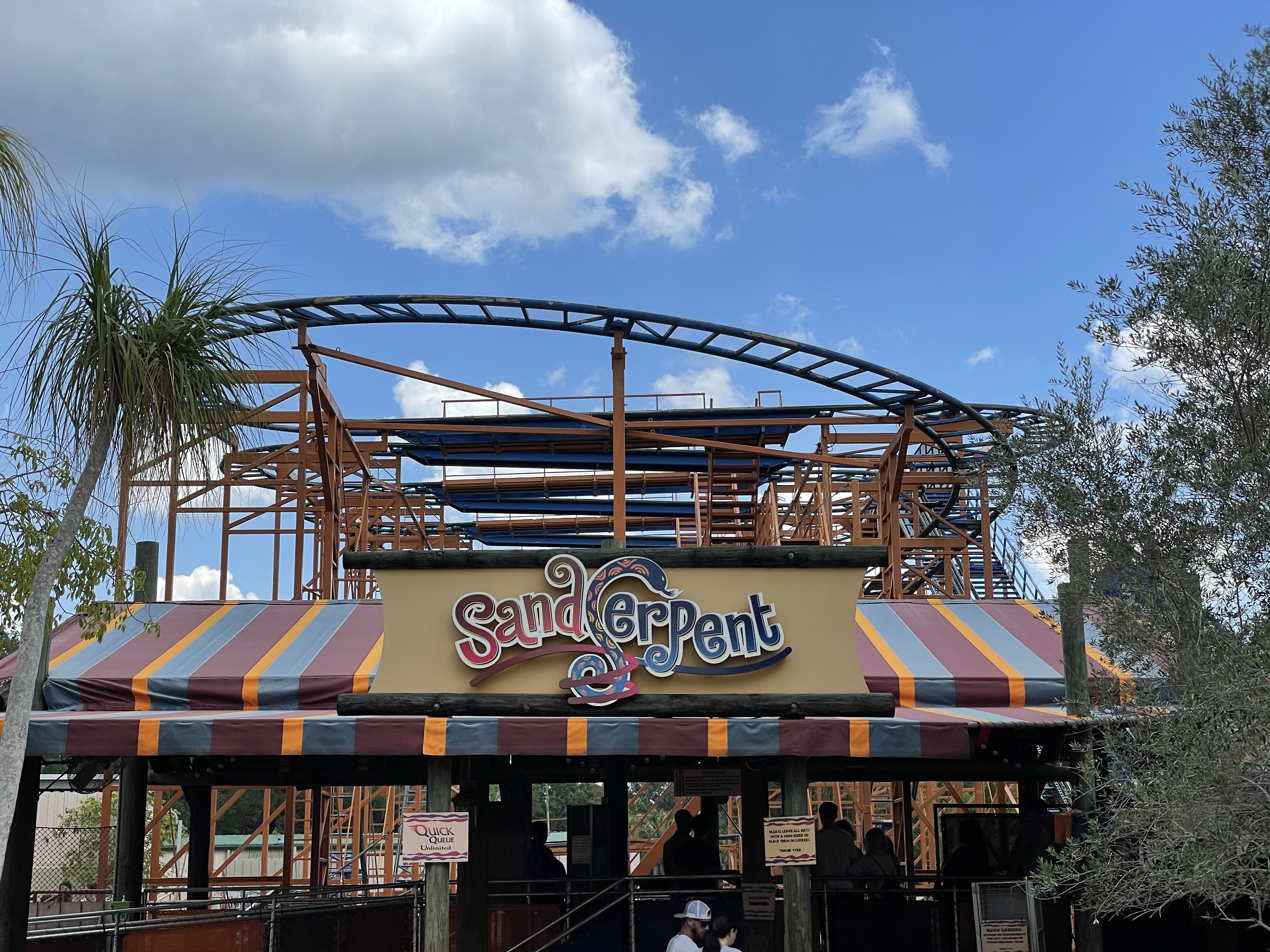
- View of Sand Serpent from its façade

Busch Gardens Tampa Bay
- Park section: Pantopia
- Coordinates: 28.038523°N 82.422389°W
- Status: Removed
- Opening date: February 28, 2004
- Closing date: July 9, 2023
- Replaced: Crazy Camel
- Replaced by: Phoenix Rising

Busch Gardens Williamsburg
- Park section: Oktoberfest
- Coordinates: 37.235°N 76.645°W
- Status: Removed
- Opening date: April 12, 1996
- Closing date: 2003
- Replaced by: Curse of DarKastle
- Sand Serpent at Busch Gardens Williamsburg at RCDB

General statistics
- Type: Steel – Wild Mouse
- Manufacturer: Mack Rides
- Designer: Werner Stengel
- Model: Wild Maus
- Lift/launch system: Chain lift hill
- Height: 45.9 ft (14.0 m)
- Length: 1,213.9 ft (370.0 m)
- Speed: 28 mph (45 km/h)
- Duration: 1:50
- Quick Queue was available
- Sand Serpent at RCDB

Video

Sand Serpent was a Wild Mouse roller coaster located at Busch Gardens Tampa Bay in Tampa, Florida. The ride originally operated at sister park Busch Gardens Williamsburg in Williamsburg, Virginia as Wild Izzy in 1996 and later as Wild Maus from 1997 to 2003. When the roller coaster was relocated to Florida, it was renamed Cheetah Chase from 2004 to 2011 before receiving its last name change.

Sand Serpent was manufactured by Mack Rides and designed by Werner Stengel. The roller coaster reached a maximum height of 45.9 feet (14.0 m), with a maximum speed of 28 miles per hour (45 km/h), and a total length of 1,213.9 feet (370.0 m). Upon opening at Busch Gardens Williamsburg, the roller coaster was received generally well by the public, though its relocation at Busch Gardens Tampa Bay was minimally covered.

== History ==
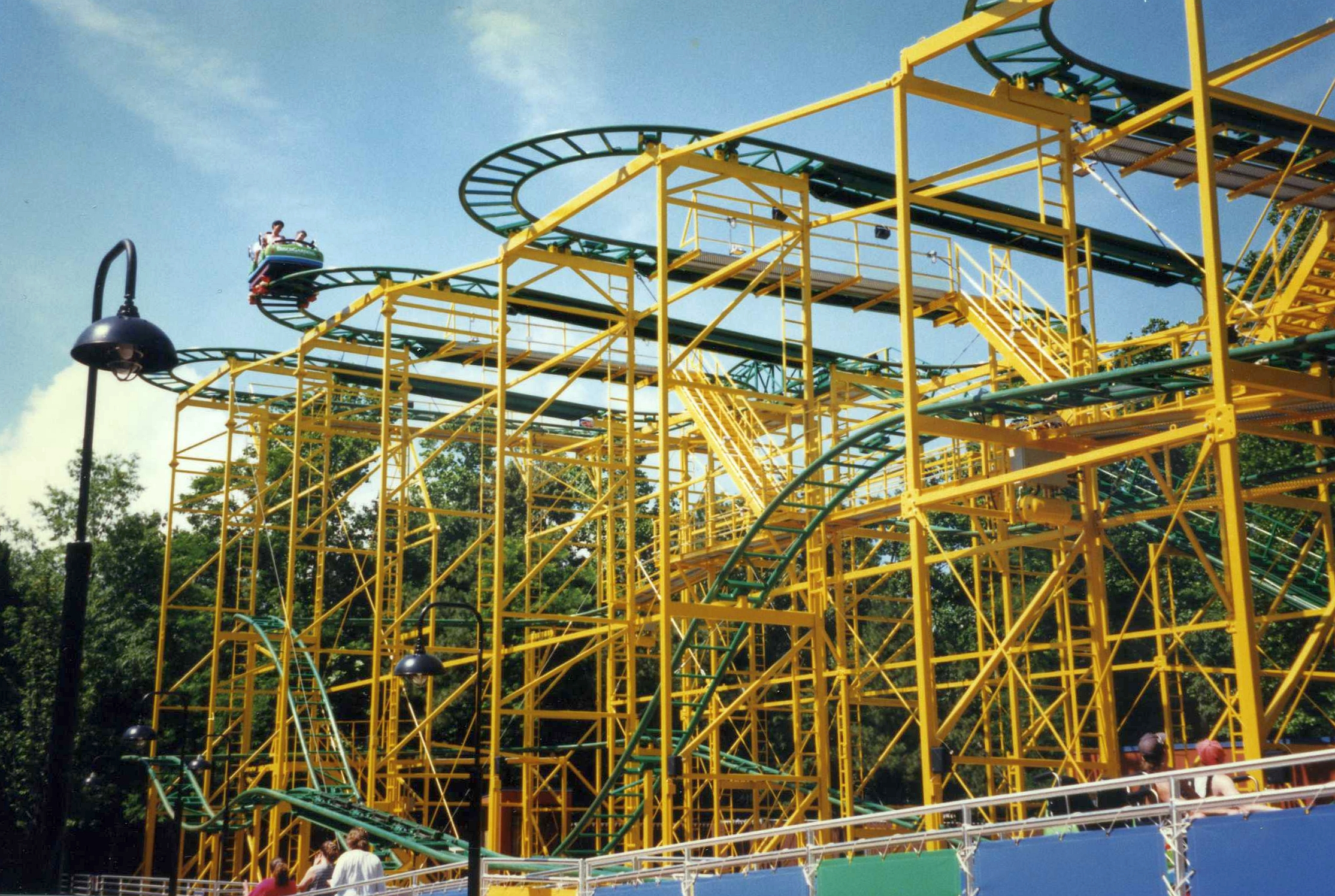
Sand Serpent during its run at Busch Gardens Williamsburg

In December 1995, Busch Gardens Williamsburg announced Wild Izzy, a Mack Rides Wild Mouse roller coaster, would be added to the park for the 1996 season in the Oktoberfest section. It was named after the mascot of the 1996 Summer Olympics, since Busch Gardens was a sponsor of the games. Originally in January, it was reported that Wild Izzy would open later in March. Though in March, the roller coaster was announced to open in April. Wild Izzy officially opened on April 12. After the 1996 season, it was given a European theme and renamed to Wild Maus.

In November 2003, filings by the park for a new attraction were uncovered in James City County that would replace the Wild Maus roller coaster. After seven years of operation at Busch Gardens Williamsburg, the roller coaster closed in 2003 where it was removed and replaced with the defunct dark ride, Curse of DarKastle in 2005. In December 2003, the St. Petersburg Times reported that the Wild Maus would be shipped to Busch Gardens Tampa Bay in January 2004 and be renamed to Cheetah Chase. The roller coaster opened on February 28, in the Timbuktu section of the park.

Cheetah Chase replaced the defunct Crazy Camel flat ride that opened up with the Timbuktu section of the park in 1980. In 2011, the ride was rethemed from Cheetah Chase to Sand Serpent. This was done to reduce confusion with the park's new attraction, Cheetah Hunt. The roller coaster is situated in the Pantopia section of the park, which was renamed with the introduction of Falcon's Fury, the park's signature drop tower. Busch Gardens announced in June 2023 that Sand Serpent would close the next month for a new family inverted roller coaster named Phoenix Rising. Sand Serpent closed on July 9, 2023. Phoenix Rising subsequently opened on July 21, 2024.

== Characteristics ==
Sand Serpent was a stock Wild Mouse roller coaster model manufactured by Mack Rides and designed by Werner Stengel. Specifically, the ride model was the "Wild Maus", and the "Compact Mobile" version. Originally, the track was green and had yellow supports, with each car featuring colors from the Olympic rings along with lightning bolts and stars. The last iteration featured blue track and orange supports, with the cars variously colored solid blue, orange, or red.

Sand Serpent reached a maximum speed of 28 miles per hour (45 km/h), with the track having a total length of 1,213.9 feet (370.0 m), and encompassed a 144.3 feet (44.0 m) by 62.3 feet (19.0 m) area. The roller coaster operates with single cars that navigated the layout. The four riders per car are arranged in two rows with two seats across each. Unlike similar Wild Mouse roller coasters produced by Mack Rides, the Sand Serpent model did not feature dips in the track prior to the brake run.

=== Ride experience ===
The car exited the station into a left turn and entered the 45.9 foot (14.0 m) tall lift hill. Following the lift, the car descended downward and went into a series of 180-degree turns that run parallel to each other. After the series of turns, the car made a wider continuous downward turn until it straightened out. The car then headed forward into a hill and two tight left turns. Thereafter the car dipped downward and ascended another hill where it takes another two left turns. The car then descended into another drop where the train headed upward into two tight left turns. Following the turn, the car descended into a hill and into the final brake run where it made a final left turn into the station. One cycle of the roller coaster took around two minutes to complete.

== Reception ==
Upon its original opening at Busch Gardens Williamsburg, the roller coaster was generally well received by the public. In the Daily Press' coverage, Michael McCary, a musician present, had described the roller coaster jokingly "not for tall people", as the force banged up his knees. Other guests during its opening stated that it was "scarier than you might think", relating it with that of the steel roller coaster Drachen Fire. In covering the state of Virginia's amusement parks, writers of The Star Democrat had described it as "distinctly different" from others because of its "jerky turns and quick dips" that would appeal to everyone. With its relocation to Busch Gardens Tampa Bay, the roller coaster was minimally covered by newspapers during its quiet debut in February 2004.

== See also ==
- List of attractions at Busch Gardens Tampa
- Wild Mouse (Hersheypark), a similar Wild Mouse roller coaster produced by Mack Rides
