= Escape from Pompeii =

Amusement park ride

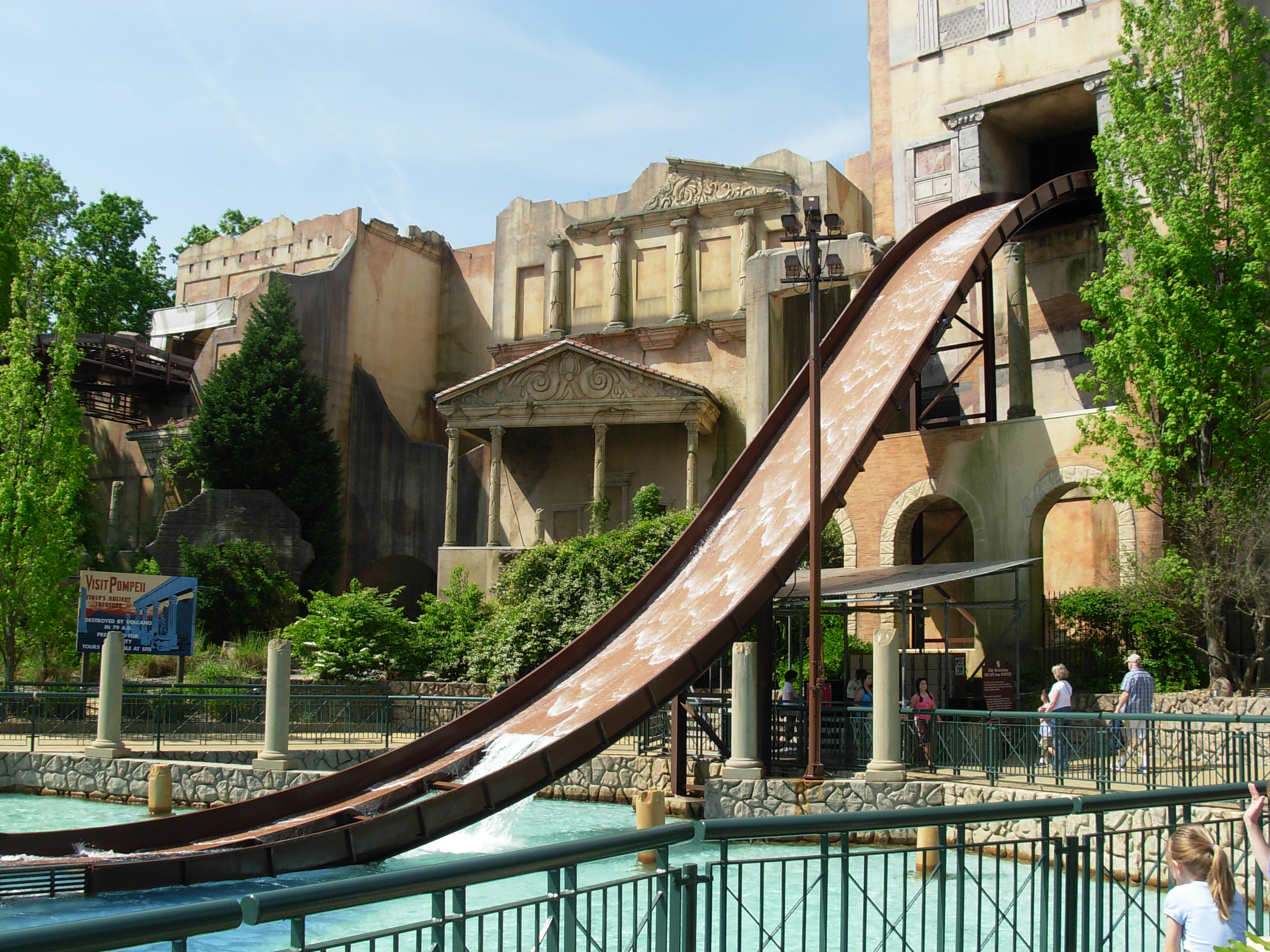
- The final drop of Escape from Pompeii

Busch Gardens Williamsburg
- Area: San Marco (Italy)
- Status: Operating
- Opening date: April 29, 1995

General statistics
- Type: Shoot the Chute
- Manufacturer: Intamin
- Model: Shoot-the-Chutes
- Height: 50 ft (15 m)
- Drop: 49 ft (15 m)
- Length: 900 ft (270 m)
- Capacity: 4 boats, 20 passengers per boat riders per hour
- Duration: 2:10
- Height restriction: 42 in (107 cm)
- Quick Queue available

Escape from Pompeii is a shoot-the-chutes water attraction designed by Intamin located at Busch Gardens Williamsburg in Williamsburg, Virginia.

The attraction is based on the ancient city of Pompeii when it was destroyed by the eruption of Mount Vesuvius in 79 AD. Guests board flat-bottom boats that advance through the attraction along a canal of water as if the volcano is alive once again. Special effects include swinging flickering lights, cracking wooden boards, burning walls and ceilings, and tumbling statues. At the end of the ride, guests go through a misty dark room right before they go down the five story drop into the splash pool below.

The ride's fire elements were installed by the same company that made the fire elements for the 1991 movie Backdraft.

== History ==
Development of a new attraction began in January 1993. A concept art was drawn on storyboards as if it was an action sequence in a motion picture. The aim was to put riders in the middle of a narrative, what Larry Giles called it a surrounding experience.

On August 23, 1994, it was announced that Escape from Pompeii would be coming to Busch Gardens Williamsburg as part of the park's 20th anniversary. Intamin was hired to construct a Shoot the Chute water ride that would feature a dark ride portion and special effects. The temple would be infested with fire effects. Over 27 million British thermal units of natural gas would be consumed every hour. The blasts were timed by computers and big fans circulated air within the temple every 30 seconds to lower the temperature. Construction of Escape from Pompeii began in May 1994 with construction crews clearing a plot of land in the Italian section. The attraction would cover 3 acres (1.2 ha) of land and the building would be over 19,000 square feet (1,800 m^{2}). Testing of the ride began in late February 1995.

Escape from Pompeii would be scheduled to open on April 29, 1995. A grand opening party was set to be held on April 28, but this event would be delayed due to the Oklahoma City bombing. However, the attraction officially opened to the general public on time as originally planned. Guests would wait upwards of two hours to ride Escape from Pompeii, but during the first summer - the ride was often closed for 'unknown reasons' to the public. However, these reasons were in fact known and none were actually mechanical ride problems. The ride's downtime stemmed from its building fire alarm system which during the hottest days (when combined with the heat from the fire effects) caused the sprinklers (which worked on a melting point) to turn on in the back hallways and the ride's safety system would spit the boats out of the building then shut down the pumps for the ride. The added downtime was implemented to clean up the water in the back hallways, get the alarm company on-site to reset the sprinkler heads, and to get the ride pumps fired back up.

The main ride building contains a haunted house that is used for Busch Gardens Williamsburg's Howl-O-Scream event. In 2011, Escape from Pompeii was temporarily transformed into Polar Pathway for the park's Christmas Town event, decorated with Christmas lights and props.

On the evening of July 21, 2018, there was a small fire which temporarily shut down the operation of the ride. The fire started on the roof of the attraction's show building and was quickly contained and extinguished. No injuries were reported and the ride reopened a few days later.

== Ride experience ==
=== Queue ===
Guests enter the queuing area near the back of the structure of the ride, where they pass a ruined structure with "Pompeii" written on it, with graffiti-like "Escape From" written above the sign. Guests then walk under the final chute to the ride, where they wind past evidence of the Pompeii disaster and past billboards of an archaeological exploration of the ruins. They continue to a covered structure where boats pass the queue, and statues and columns stand crumbling in water next to the queue.

=== Layout ===
Guests are placed in rows to board the boats. After boarding flat bottom boats as if they are touring the ruins of Pompeii, guests are taken up a 50-foot (15 m) incline. The boat makes a small drop into the main ride building, where they pass by an abandoned archaeological site and crumbling structures as tense music begins to play. The boat passes under crumbling walls where wooden beams break apart and fall into the water to the side of the boat. The boat floats past the ruins into a room full of crumbling statues and structures standing among the water. Here, real fire begins to spread throughout the room - overhead, on top of the statues, and over the water as dramatic music begins to play. The boat continues through the fiery room, past burning columns and statues. As the boat exits the room, they pass a large statue of Jupiter, which also catches fire. The boat then passes under a crumbling wooden structure as ripples of fire burn on the ceiling. A dark room leads the boat past more crumbling structures and directly under a statue, which falls right over top of the boat, but the fall is stopped by a slightly concealed pillar to the right. The boat continues, where the music picks up dramatically, into the dark room, with fog and more ruins and statues. It then advances to where a door blows open and allows guests to see outside of the ride just before plunging down the 48.5-foot tall, 80-foot long chute into the water below. During the drop, the on-ride camera takes photos of the riders. The boat splashes into the water (where water squirters can spritz riders) before the flume runs around a small garden with a Roman sundial (which replaced many archaeological dig-related props) and returns riders to the loading area to disembark.
