= Cobra's Curse =

Ride at Busch Gardens Tampa Bay

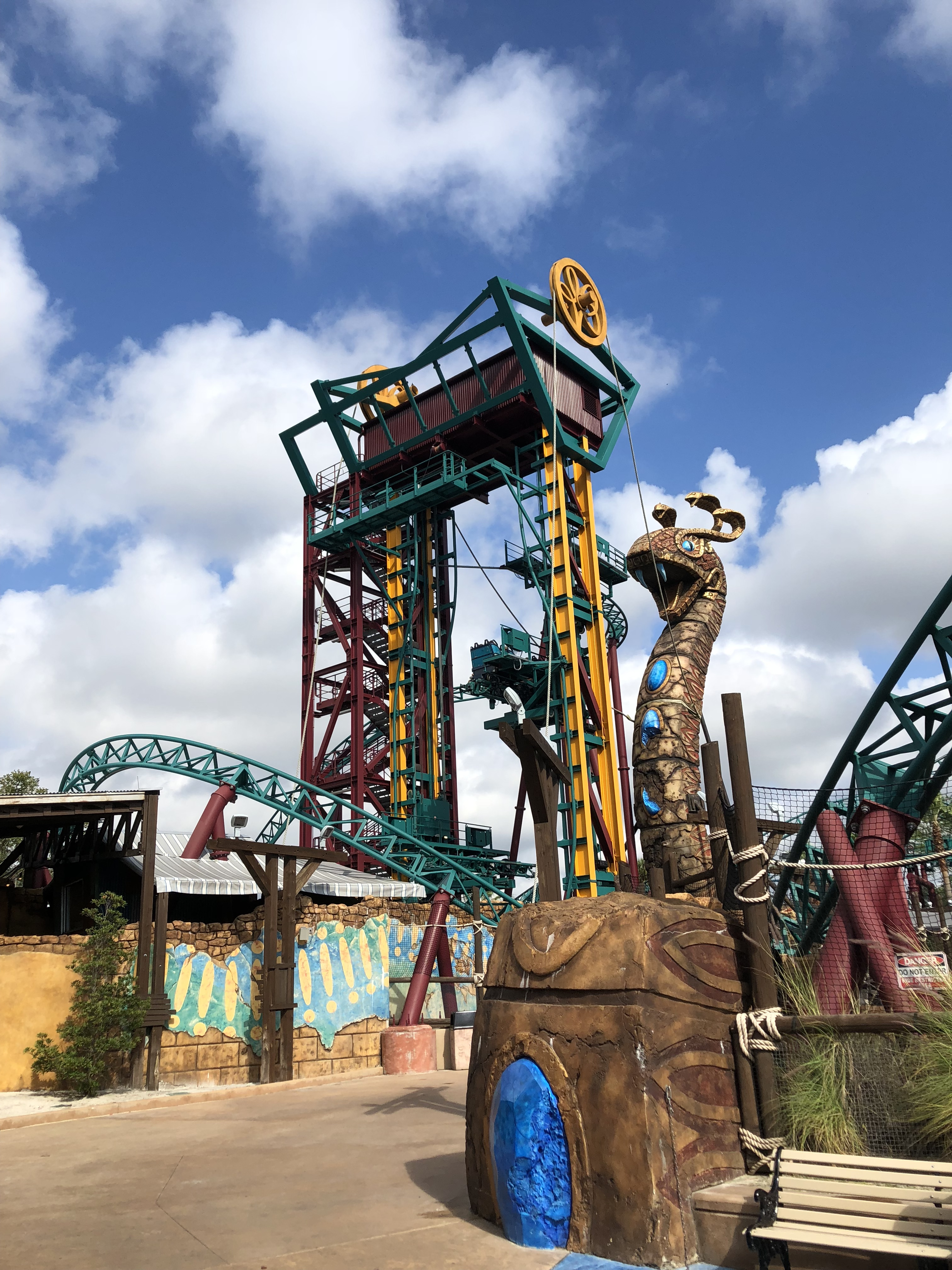
- Cobra's Curse elevator lifthill and statue

Busch Gardens Tampa Bay
- Location: Busch Gardens Tampa Bay
- Park section: Egypt
- Coordinates: 28.0343683°N 82.4188559°W
- Status: Operating
- Opening date: June 17, 2016
- Replaced: King Tut's Tomb

General statistics
- Type: Steel – Spinning
- Manufacturer: Mack Rides
- Lift/launch system: Elevator lift (first lift); Booster wheel lift hill (second lift)
- Height: 70 ft (21 m)
- Length: 2,100 ft (640 m)
- Speed: 40 mph (64 km/h)
- Inversions: 0
- Capacity: 1000 riders per hour
- Height restriction: 42 in (107 cm)
- Trains: 8 trains with 2 cars; riders arranged 2 across in 2 rows for a total of 8 riders per train
- Quick Queue available
- Cobra's Curse at RCDB

Cobra's Curse is a steel spinning roller coaster at Busch Gardens Tampa Bay in Tampa, Florida, United States. The roller coaster, opened in 2016, was manufactured by Mack Rides, features an elevator-style lift, and was the first new ride to open at the park since Falcon's Fury opened in 2014. Cobra's Curse presents a fictional story about the ancient Egyptian ruler the Snake King Venymyss and his curse upon his lost kingdom. The roller coaster has a track length of 2,100 feet (640 m), reaches a height of 80 feet (24 m), and has a maximum speed of 40 mph (64 km/h).

Cobra's Curse is located in the Egypt section of the park and features a 100 feet (30 m) snake statue that depicts King Venymyss, which is located in front of the elevator lift hill. The trains of the roller coaster are able to lock and rotate in three stages; the trains face forward, backward, and then turn in to a free spin. The roller coaster received mostly positive reviews from critics.

== History ==
Development of the new attraction—which would become Cobra's Curse—began in 2014 around the time of the completion of Falcon's Fury. In February 2015, Busch Gardens Tampa Bay officials acknowledged a new attraction would be constructed in the Egypt portion of the park but did not elaborate further. During the same month, permits filed through the Southwest Florida Water Management District outlined a project titled "BGT 2016 Attraction" were uncovered. The permit detailed the removal of 28,349 square feet (2,633.7 m^{2}) of concrete, specified the expansion of 11,605 square feet (1,078.1 m^{2}) of an existing attraction space known as King Tut's Tomb, and the addition of another 40,751 square feet (3,785.9 m^{2}) consisting of trenches and concrete paths. Construction for the new attraction in the Egypt area of the park began in March 2015. The park announced on March 17, 2015, that the Serengeti Railway would be temporarily closed for a new attraction that would be along its route in 2016.

SeaWorld Entertainment, the parent company of Busch Gardens Tampa Bay, filed the trademark "Cobra's Curse" with the United States Patent and Trademark Office on May 8, 2015. Busch Gardens Tampa Bay officials revealed plans to build a new roller coaster that was manufactured by Mack Rides and would be called Cobra's Curse on May 28, which was expected to open in 2016. Busch Gardens President Jim Dean commented that Cobra's Curse would be a complement to "the selection of thrill rides Busch Gardens offers."

Throughout the construction of the roller coaster, Jeff Hornick, the regional director of design and engineering at SeaWorld Entertainment, gave updates on the progression of the roller coaster's construction starting in July 2015. The general construction of the roller coaster was handled by PCL Construction. Vertical construction of the roller coaster track began on October 9, 2015 in the middle of the layout due to space constraints within the section of the park. During the November 2015 International Association of Amusement Parks and Attractions (IAAPA) Convention in Orlando, Florida, Mack Rides revealed additional details and a scale model of Cobra's Curse.

Media outlets were given a tour of the roller coaster's progress on February 17, 2016, during which the roller coaster's trains and further information on the ride's theme were revealed. On February 29, the headpiece of the roller coaster's snake statue "King Venymyss" was installed. The final piece of track was installed on March 19, which was announced three days later. Busch Gardens Tampa Bay released an on-ride point-of-view video of the attraction on May 11. On May 28, the construction walls surrounding the attraction were removed. The Orlando Sentinel reported that the Cobra's Curse was nearly completed by June 6, when the park released a construction update and another POV video of the roller coaster. On June 10, it was reported the official opening date would be a week later and on June 17, the roller coaster officially opened to the public.

== Ride experience ==
=== Theming ===
The roller coaster features the fictional story of the Snake King Venymyss, a fictional ancient Egyptian ruler who was once praised by his subjects but became corrupt with power. The subjects of the King turned against him, and destroyed his statue from which his powers were granted. In the aftermath, the King placed a curse upon the subjects of anyone who would rebuild his statue. In the present, the story follows the park discovering the remnants of the snake tomb and hired archaeologists from the fictional group Viper International Survey and Excavation (VISE) to excavate the area.

=== Queue area ===
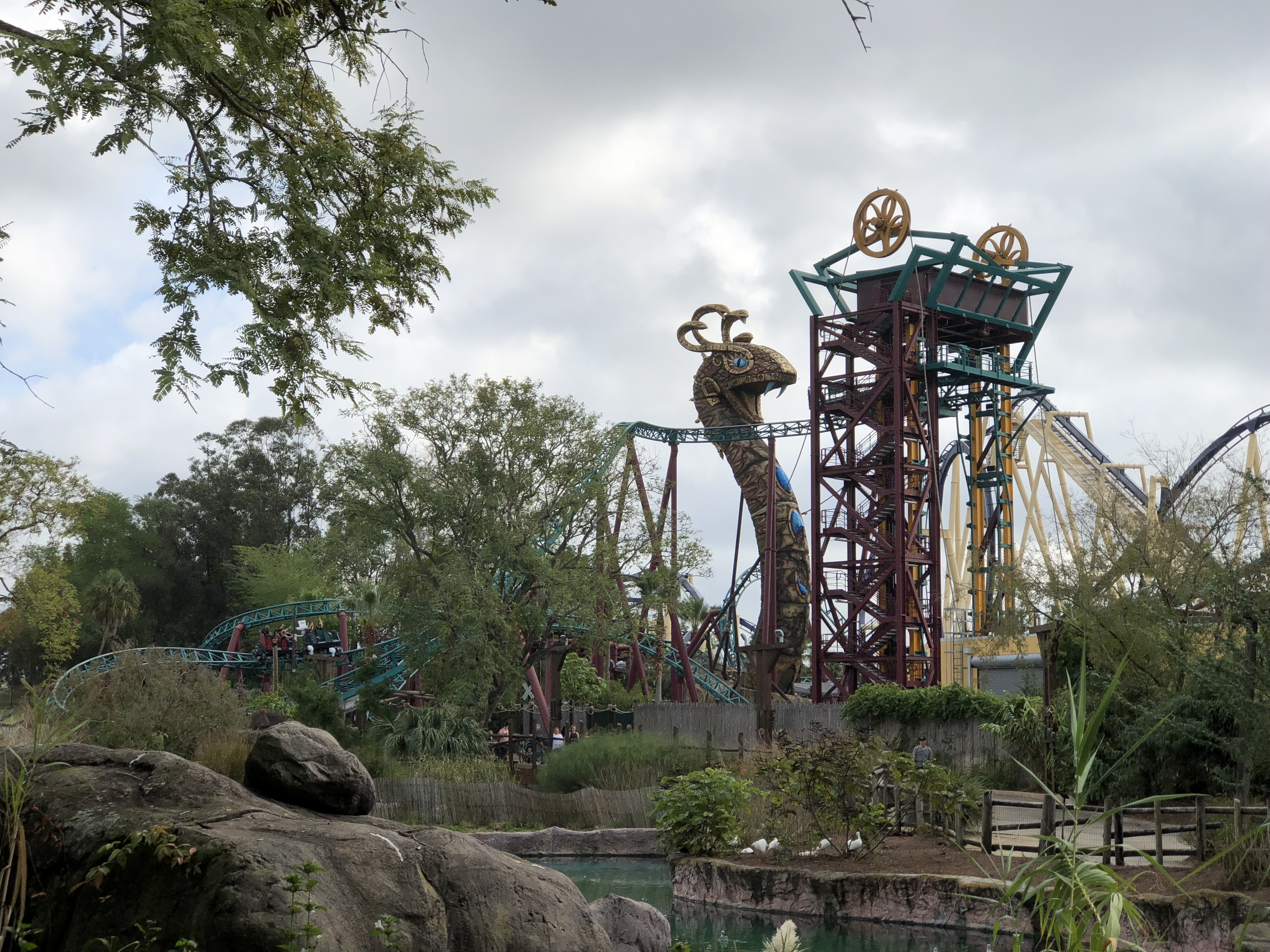
Cobra's Curse as seen from the Edge of Africa portion of the park

The roller coaster's queue area is divided into different parts to display the narrative of the central theme. The first area is an exterior queue titled the "Dig Team Living Quarters", where educational displays about different species of snake are displayed. In the interior space of the queue area, guests enter the first chamber, which features a 400 cubic feet (11 m^{3}) enclosure with four species of live snakes: a Bitis nasicornis, a Gaboon viper, a Jameson's mamba, and an Anchieta's dwarf python. After circumnavigating the hallways, guests proceed into the second chamber where projection mapping on a statue and wall depict the story of the roller coaster, exhibiting three shows. Thereafter, guests enter the roller coaster's station and enter the train to be transported to the elevator lift.

=== Layout ===
Upon reaching the top of the roller coaster's 70-foot-tall (21 m) elevator lift, the train turns to the left and banks outward, taking riders closer to the 80-foot-tall (24 m) statue of King Venymyss before continuing along the course. From there, the train descends the first drop, reaching a maximum speed of 40 mph (64 km/h) and banking right. The train makes another banked turn over the mid-course brake run before circling back to it. From the mid-course brake run, the two separate cars on the train rotate backwards and King Venymyss can be heard saying, "Turn, turn, and face your fear". The train then descends through a minor helix, which carries it to a wheel lift hill. From there, the train descends another banked drop, causing the individual cars to spin freely. The train goes through a series of overbanked turns, and changes in acceleration and velocity while spinning. The trains travels under the Serengeti Railway attraction before entering the final brake run and returning to the station.

== Characteristics ==
=== Location ===
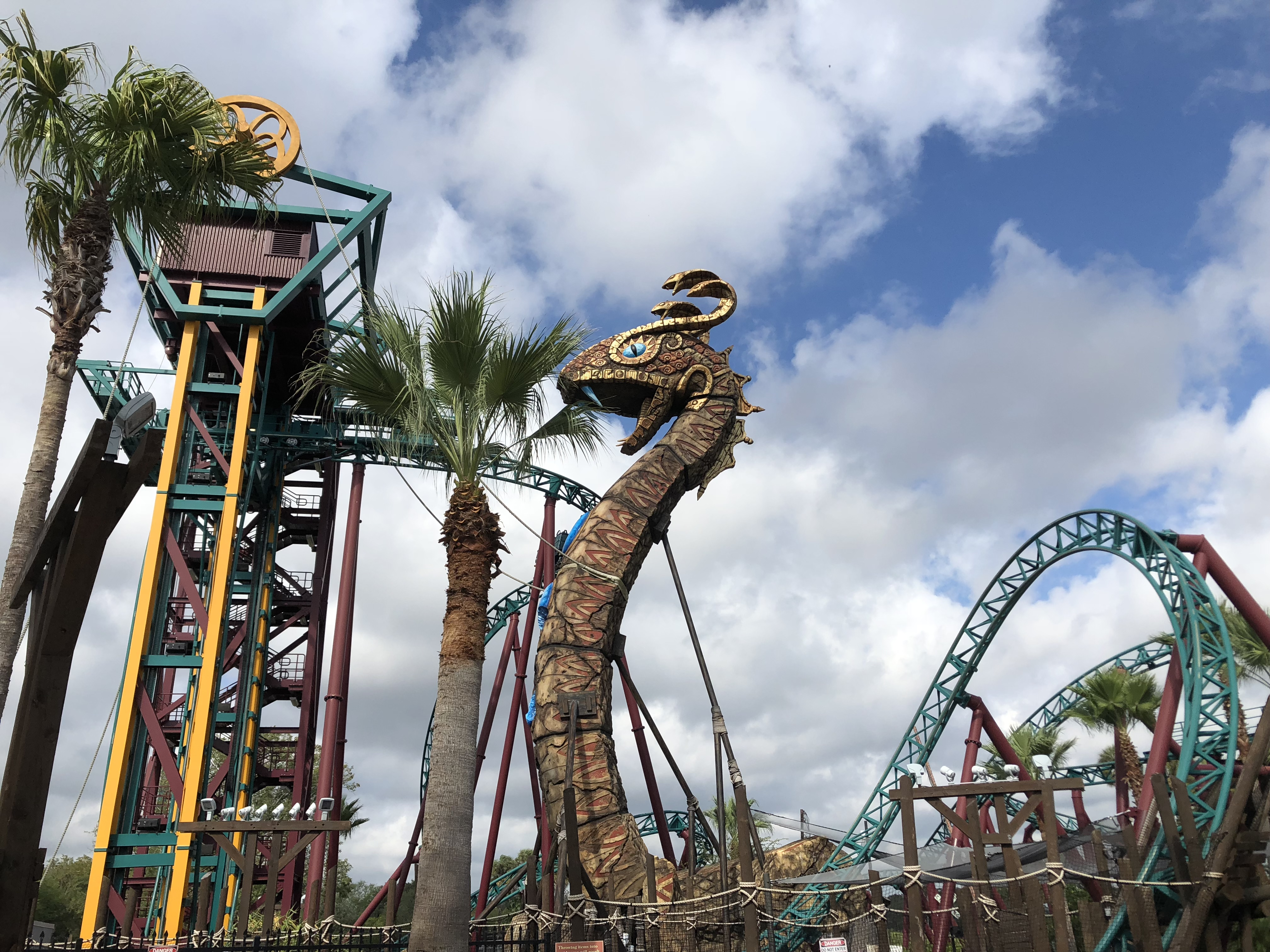
Side view of the King Venymyss statue and elevator lift

Cobra's Curse is located on 2.65 acres (1.07 ha) of land in the Egypt section of the park. During construction of Cobra's Curse, the Serengeti Railway had to be rerouted, which took about two months to complete. The King Tut's Tomb exhibit was removed and re-purposed as part of the queue for Cobra's Curse. An additional market and food place were constructed for the area surrounding the roller coaster. An acknowledgement to the former attraction can be seen in the restrooms near the roller coaster; after pushing a "pharaoh" button under the mirror, a mask of King Tut will appear through the glass.

=== Statue ===
The roller coaster's snake statue, King Venymyss, is 80 feet (24 m) tall and was installed as nine pieces stacked on top of one another. During construction, the pieces were installed with a steel spine to keep it in place and the exterior of the structure was created from fiberglass and foam. The headpiece has 3-foot-wide (0.91 m) eyes and 4-foot-long (1.2 m) fangs. The completed structure weighs 30,000 pounds (14,000 kg).

=== Trains ===
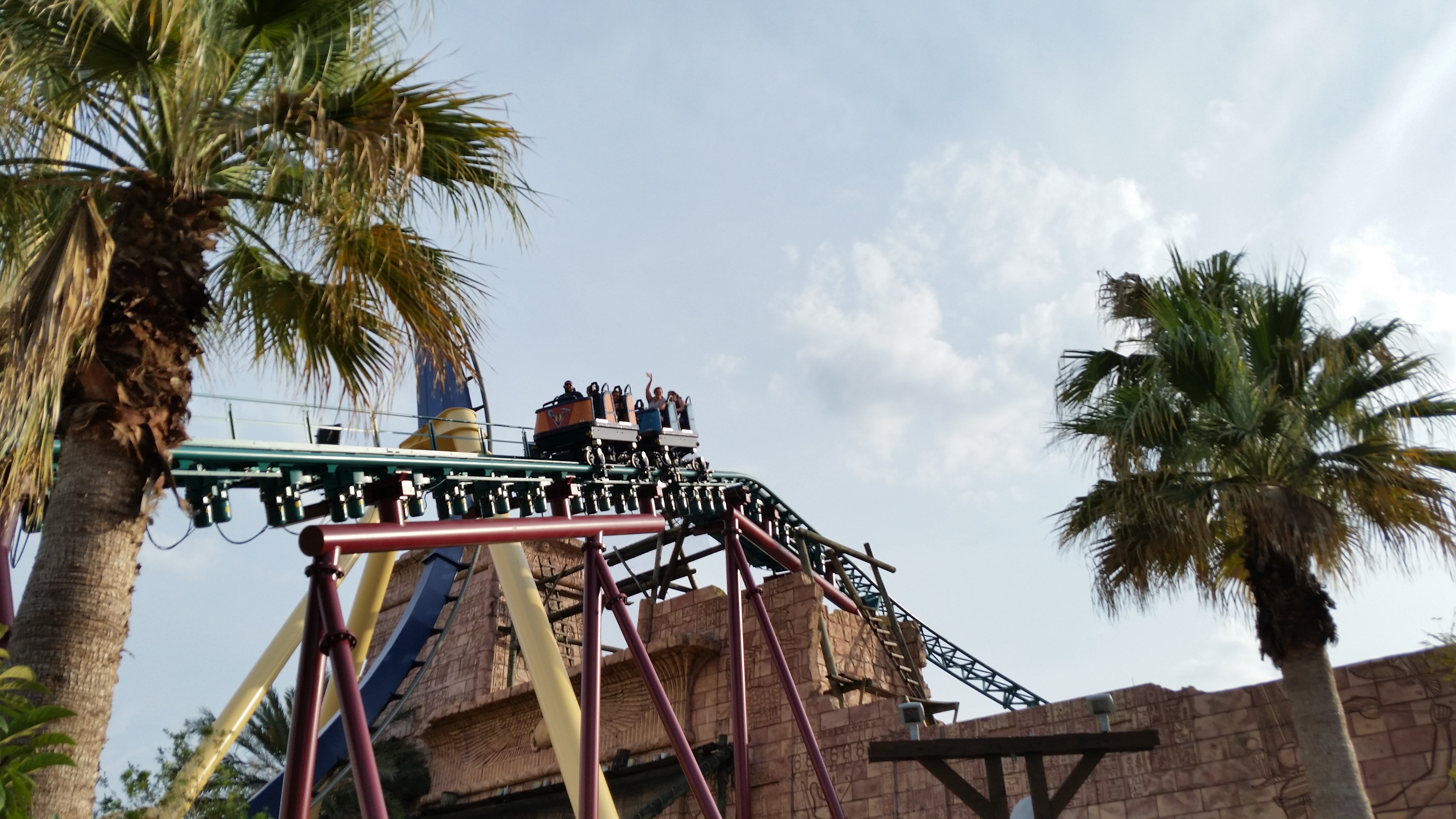
Cobra's Curse trains as they traverse up the wheel lift

The roller coaster was made by Mack Rides, a German ride manufacturer that developed the trains for the roller coaster with individual, spinning cars. Cobra's Curse features a traditional spinning roller coaster train; the individual cars are able to spin at a rate dependent upon the distribution of the rider's weight in each car. The trains are also able to individually lock in place and rotate while on the track using of a motor located under each car. Each train has a unique color scheme and has a lap bar restraint. The trains constantly traverse the layout as the station has a moving belt platform.

=== Track ===
The roller coaster's tubular steel track, which was fabricated in Germany, is 2,100 feet (640 m) long. The track of the roller coaster is green and the supports lining the lift hill are red and yellow. The track was inspired by the S-shaped curvature of a snake. The design of the track allowed for the use of headchopper elements from nearby structures, trenches, attractions, and pathways in the surrounding area. A switch-back track is located behind the station, allowing for easy access for riders who require assistance.

== Reception ==
Prior to the roller coaster's opening, the Tampa Bay Times reported that animal activists were concerned with the prospective treatment of the snakes that would be housed in the queue because of their sensitivity to vibrations. Busch Gardens Tampa Bay officials acknowledged the concerns, and commented that they were accommodating the snakes to their new environment while watching them and other animals for their reactions to the roller coaster, as their enclosure would be host to educational purposes of the reptile species.

Upon opening, Cobra's Curse was received positively among critics and guests. Dewayne Bevil of the Orlando Sentinel compared the overall attraction to nearby roller coaster Montu and other roller coasters at the park, finding Cobra's Curse less intense than them. Bevil also wrote that it "fits a nice need, giving thrill seekers a good time without screwing with their equilibrium too much". Alex Volland from the Tampa Bay Times stated the roller coaster was "smooth and family-friendly" and that it "fills the park's need for attractions that parents and kids can experience together". Volland also stated that the queue area of the roller coaster was an "experience of its own". Marjie Lambert of the Miami Herald wrote that the roller coaster hit the mark for a family spinning roller coaster, crediting the park's creative and engineering teams for this and stating, "It's just enough to add a little spice to a mostly tame ride". Lambert concluded that the roller coaster, "With brief thrills, a little spin and a lot of fun, [family thrill ride is] an apt label". Jeff Siegal of Theme Park Insider commented that the roller coaster is "great for everyone" and that it has "a good amount of spin" that is not sickening and also has a "great amount of theming".

== See also ==
- 2016 in amusement parks
- Time Traveler (roller coaster), a similar spinning roller coaster by Mack Rides that utilizes a controlled spinning train
