= Cheetah Hunt =

Amusement ride in Tampa, Florida

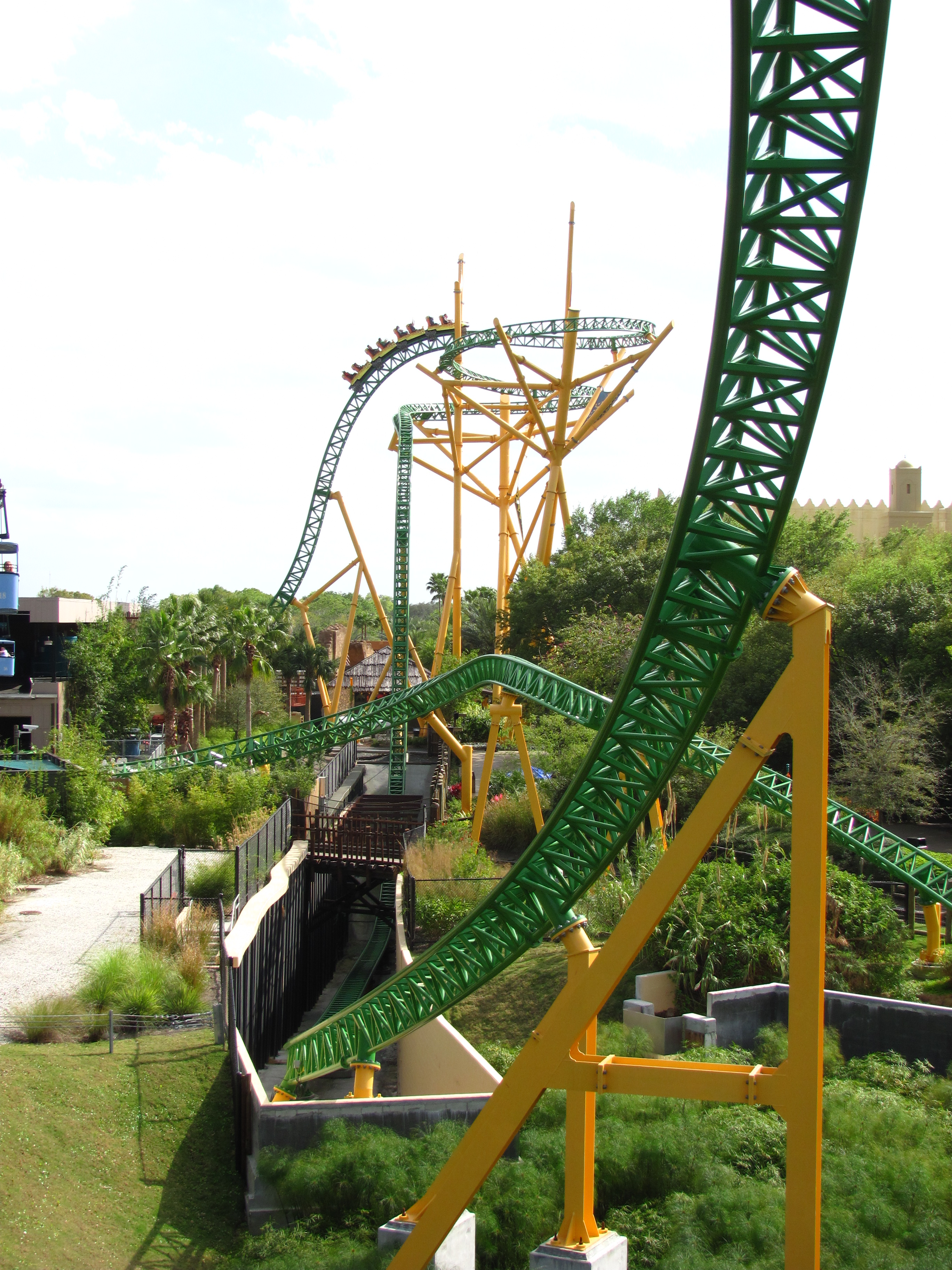
- An overview of part of Cheetah Hunt

Busch Gardens Tampa Bay
- Location: Busch Gardens Tampa Bay
- Park section: Edge of Africa
- Coordinates: 28°2′3″N 82°25′12″W
- Status: Operating
- Opening date: May 27, 2011

General statistics
- Type: Steel – Launched
- Manufacturer: Intamin
- Designer: PGAV Destinations
- Model: Blitz Coaster
- Lift/launch system: LSM launch
- Height: 102 ft (31 m)
- Drop: 130 ft (40 m)
- Length: 4,429 ft (1,350 m)
- Speed: 60 mph (97 km/h)
- Inversions: 1
- G-force: 4
- Trains: 5 trains with 4 cars; riders arranged 2 across in 2 rows for a total of 16 riders per train
- Launches: 1. 30 mph (48 km/h) in 1.8 seconds; 2. 60 mph (97 km/h) in 2.4 seconds; 3. 40 mph (64 km/h) in 2.1 seconds
- Website: buschgardens.com/tampa/roller-coasters/cheetah-hunt/
- Quick Queue available
- Cheetah Hunt at RCDB

Video

Cheetah Hunt is a steel launched roller coaster at Busch Gardens Tampa Bay in Tampa, Florida. The roller coaster was manufactured by Intamin and designed in collaboration with Mark Rose. Cheetah Hunt opened to the public on May 27, 2011, alongside a cheetah exhibit called Cheetah Run. Cheetah Hunt features three linear synchronous motor (LSM) launches and a single inversion. The roller coaster reaches a height of 102 feet (31 m), with a maximum speed of 60 miles per hour (97 km/h) and a total track length of 4,429 feet (1,350 m).

Cheetah Hunt is located in the Edge of Africa section of the park and navigates through the Serengeti Plain section. The Cheetah Run exhibit replaced the Budweiser Clydesdales stable area with an 11,000-square-foot (1,000 m^{2}) space and a 220-foot (67 m) sprint track. The roller coaster utilizes the former monorail station and Rhino Rally water section for its track. Upon opening, Cheetah Hunt received positive acclaim from the public, and ranked as the 2nd Best New Ride of 2011 by the Golden Ticket Awards.

== History ==
The roller coaster, later to be known as Cheetah Hunt, took seven years from conceptualization to completion. Cheetah Hunt was designed by Mark Rose, vice president of design and engineering at Busch Gardens Tampa Bay. Rose was inspired by a scene in the Star Wars film Return of the Jedi where the protagonists navigated the forests of Endor on speeder bikes. The attraction was also inspired by SeaWorld Orlando's roller coaster Manta with its combination of animal habitat and attraction. Rose initially thought of using a lift hill to reach the speed he wanted, but after realizing the height of the lift would be too tall, he incorporated the design to include a linear synchronous motor (LSM) system.

Bolliger & Mabillard, among other manufacturers, were considered for the latter attraction, with Intamin ultimately being chosen because of the manufacturer's technology development and the park's expectations. In the early planning and construction stages, the roller coaster was initially called "Cheetaka", as a trademark was filed on April 18, 2010, for the name by SeaWorld Parks & Entertainment, parent company of Busch Gardens Tampa Bay. After the park realized that the name was too hard to pronounce and didn't describe the ride, the trademark was abandoned.

Construction walls and survey stakes were observed in April 2010 within the Edge of Africa section, with the Serengeti Express closed to reposition railroad track. Trenches were beginning to be dug out in May, and by June, the transportation gondola, Skyride, was closed for the rumored attraction. During that month, the park launched a teaser campaign revealing details of the attraction. The campaign featured a website that showcased videos describing the attraction's main characteristics, updates from park officials, and cutscenes of the ride's point-of-view shot video from June to August. The park released a photo on its social media account of the roller coaster's track on September 10.

The construction of the foundations was completed in October 2010. The day prior to the announcement of the ride on October 12, a second trademark was filed under the name of "Cheetah Hunt". Cheetah Hunt was officially announced on October 13, alongside a new "Cheetah Run" habitat. Temporary pathways were erected during the construction of Cheetah Hunt behind the former Budweiser Clydesdales stables to reroute foot traffic. By November, vertical construction began and some supports for the ride were already in place. By mid-December, the supports for the 102-foot-tall (31 m) figure 8 element were complete with some pieces of track also installed, including the first launch section being complete.

The park announced on February 17 that the attraction would open in late May. The roller coaster's trains arrived on February 28. Track work for the roller coaster was completed on March 14. It was observed that the park was completing "walk-through tests" on the track, a measure to ensure the trains could safely clear obstacles, in late March. Testing began for the roller coaster with water dummies in late April. Cheetah Hunt opened to the public on May 27. Another roller coaster in the park, Cheetah Chase, was renamed Sand Serpent to reduce confusion between the two roller coasters.

== Ride experience ==
The ride begins with a 30-mile-per-hour (48 km/h) linear synchronous motor (LSM) launch out of the station and around a wide left turn followed by a gradual dip before approaching the second launch. The second launch accelerates riders to their top speed of 60 miles per hour (97 km/h) before climbing a 102-foot (31 m) figure-eight element (also known as a Windcatcher Tower). Riders weave through a series of helixes before dropping 130 feet (40 m) into a trench, then proceed over a direction-changing airtime hill crossing over the Skyride, before completing the ride's only inversion, a heartline roll. Upon exiting the barrel-roll and its subsequent brake run, the ride remains low to the ground and goes through a series of short banked turns through a rock fixture simulating several "near misses". This leads the ride into its third and final launch, which accelerates riders to a speed of 40 miles per hour (64 km/h) to navigate its way back to the station. During the journey back, there are more airtime and direction-changing hills before the final brake run.

== Characteristics ==
Cheetah Hunt was originally termed within the Crown Colony Plaza area of the park, now the Edge of Africa section. The roller coaster is inspired by the general species of cheetah. The themed area features a mixture of concrete and driftwood cheetah statues and a large rock-shaped cheetah located within the queue area. The themed land surrounding both roller coaster and exhibit uses a mix of architectural styles inspired by three of the park's themed lands: Africa, Egypt, and Morocco. The roller coaster's queue area is themed to a collapsed temple. Cheetah Hunt covers 13 acres (5.3 ha) of land within Busch Gardens Tampa Bay.

=== Cheetah Run ===
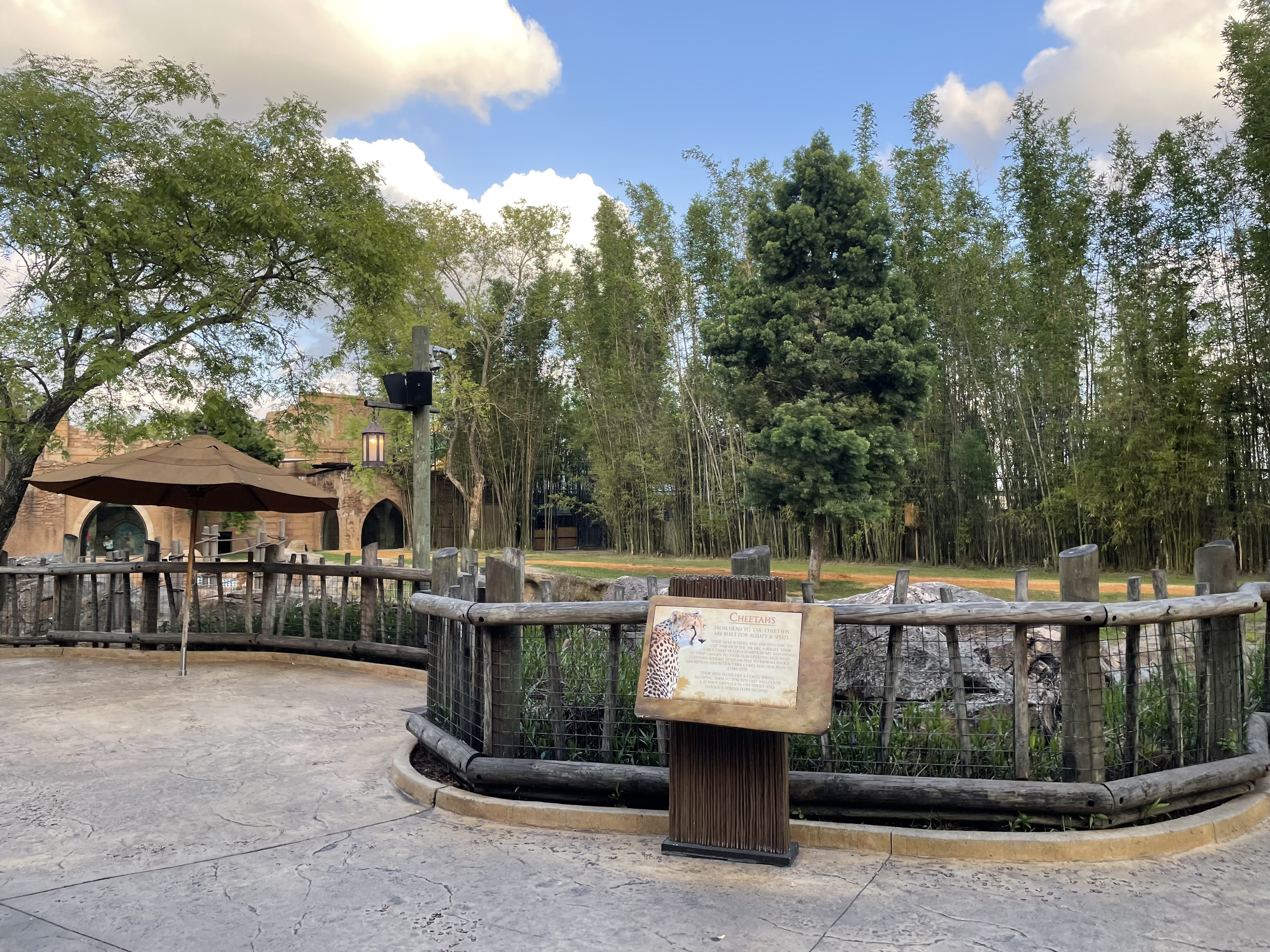
Cheetah Run enclosure

To go alongside Cheetah Hunt, the park opened an animal exhibit called Cheetah Run that replaced the Budweiser Clydesdales interaction area. The exhibit is located adjacent to the roller coaster's main launch sequence. The exhibit features glass-paneled viewing areas which allow visitors to watch cheetahs sprint across a 220-foot (67 m) dirt track and educational touch screen panels. Cheetah Run encompasses an area of 11,000 square feet (1,000 m^{2}) and houses rockwork, a waterfall, and grassland among areas of a ruined temple. The cheetahs are housed within the old stable building.

In February 2011, five cheetahs arrived on site in preparation for the opening of the exhibit. The cheetahs originated from the White Oak Conservation Center located near Jacksonville, Florida, and South Africa. During construction of the habitat, the cheetahs were accommodated to various sounds that would surround their enclosure. Cheetah Run opened with the roller coaster on May 27, 2011, with 14 cheetahs.

=== Track ===
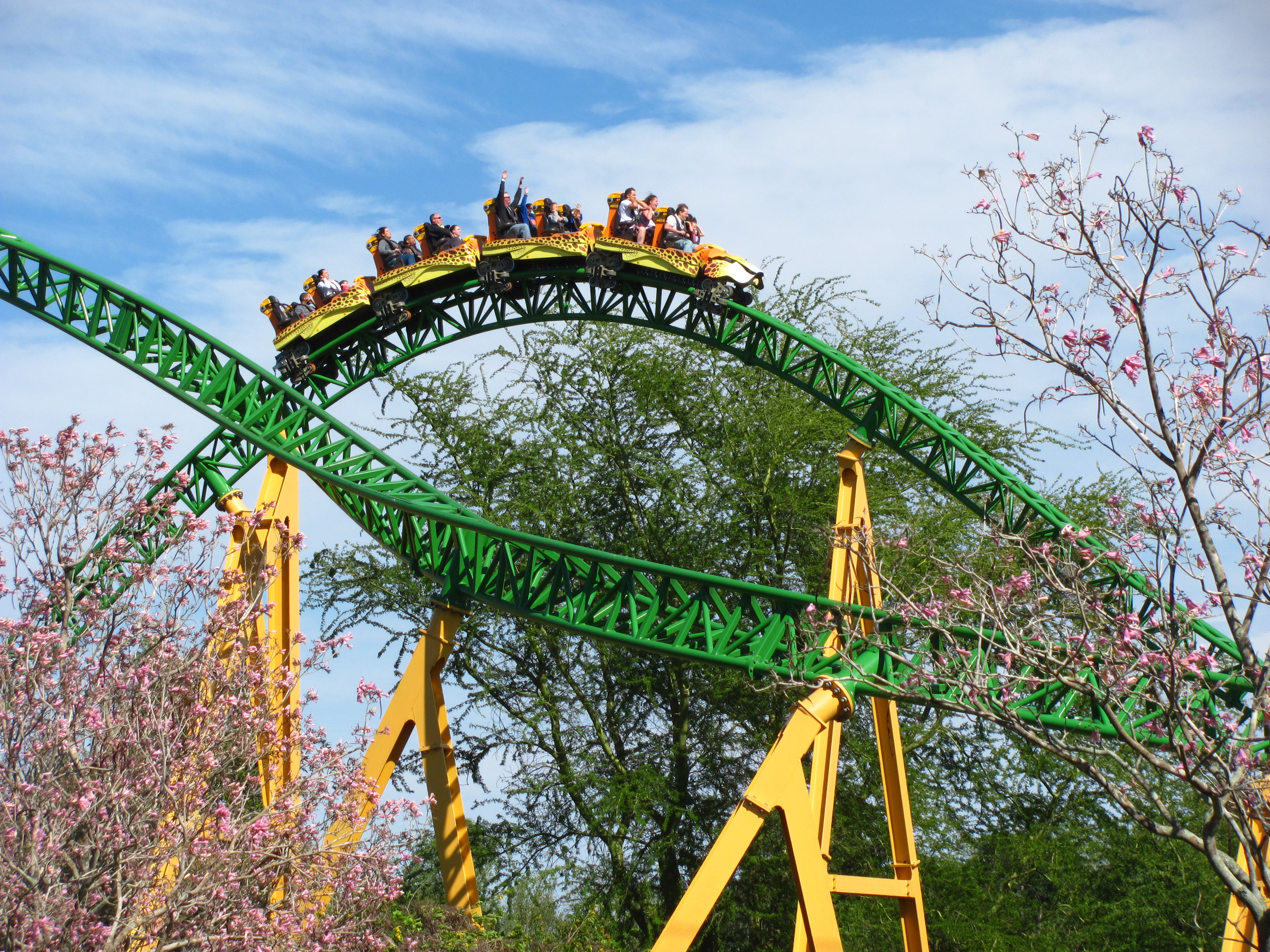
Cheetah Hunt as it traverses its layout

Cheetah Hunt is an Intamin steel launched roller coaster manufactured by Intamin's United States distributor, Intaride LLC. The track is colored green with the supports colored gold to reflect the habitat of the cheetahs in the section of the park. The ride's station is located in the former monorail station that was decommissioned in the 1990s and is housed within the same building that is occupied by the Skyride. The station features a two-train loading system. Cheetah Hunt is one of two roller coasters that feature a Windcatcher Tower element.

The track of the roller coaster extends into the Serengeti Plain section of the park, and into the defunct water canyon section of Rhino Rally. Four trenches were constructed for Cheetah Hunt to traverse under the Serengeti Plain as well as a pedestrian bridge. In addition, the track traverses over the Skyride gondolas. The maintenance bay for the roller coaster is located on a lower level of the building. The steel track is 4,429 feet (1,350 m) long.

=== Trains ===
Each train is colored yellow with cheetah print, with the front piece of the train designed to appear as a cheetah's head. Cheetah Hunt operates with five trains, each with four cars that are arranged two across in two rows, allowing for 16 riders per train. The station allows for two trains to be loaded at the same time. Each seat has an over-the-shoulder restraint. Each train on Cheetah Hunt exerts a maximum of 4.0 g-forces to its riders.

== Incidents ==
On February 12, 2014, one of the trains, loaded with 16 passengers, stopped between the first and second launch on the roller coaster's banked crest. Park officials attempted to move the train backwards onto the launch platform but failed. The Tampa Fire Rescue Department was called thereafter to rescue the passengers with a cherry picker and a ladder during inclement weather. All passengers were rescued without injury. The roller coaster remained closed the day after the incident for inspection by park maintenance.

== Reception ==
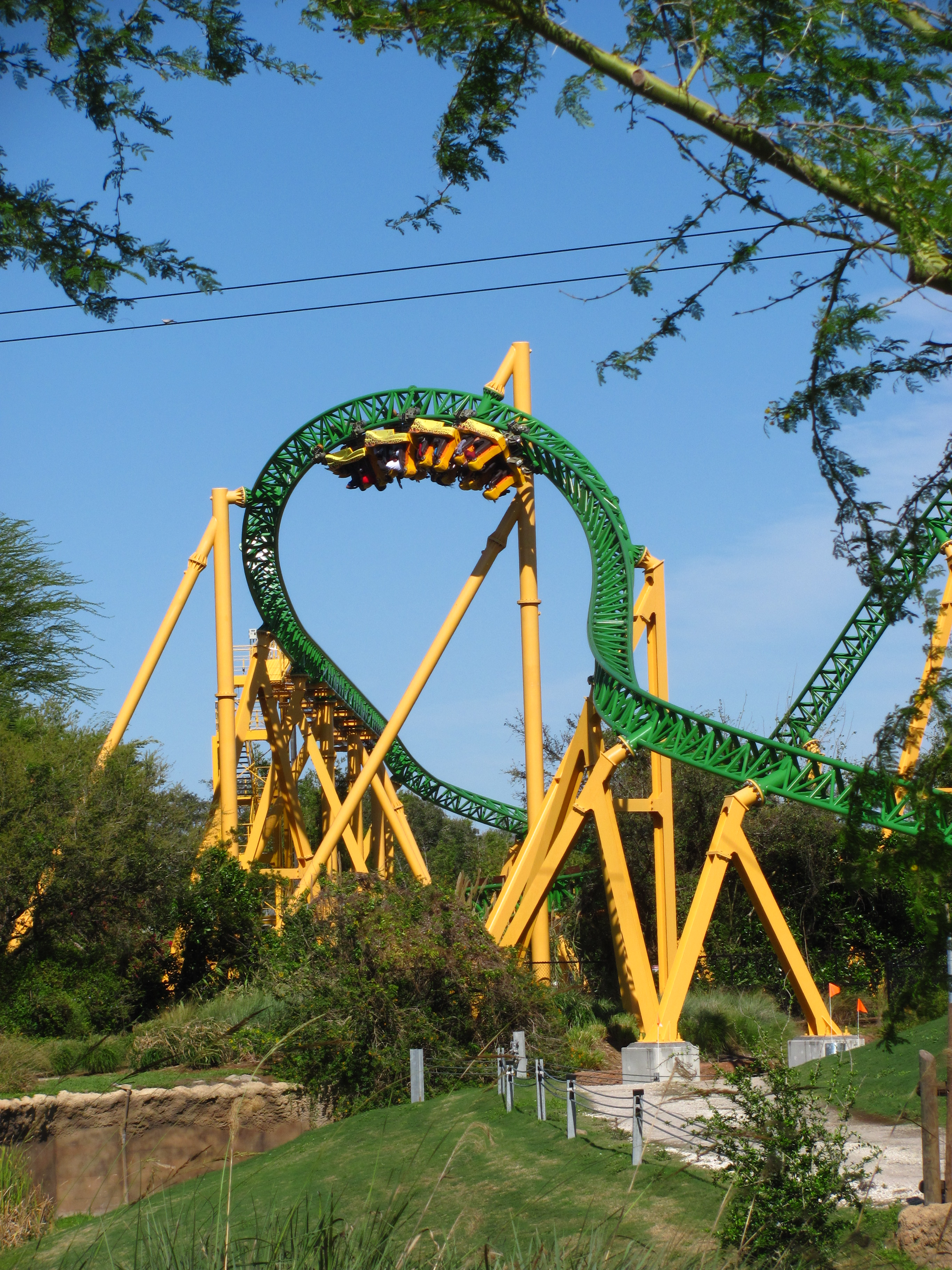
One of Cheetah Hunt's trains as it traverses through the heartline roll

After the original name was changed upon the roller coaster's announcement, some theme park enthusiasts criticized the change, saying that "Cheetah Hunt" did not fit the roller coaster and pressing Busch Gardens to revert the name back to "Cheetaka". However, Busch Gardens responded saying that the name would not be changed.

Cheetah Hunt was mostly well-received by the public and critics. Sean Daly from the Tampa Bay Times said that Cheetah Hunt is not that scary and compared it to SheiKra and Montu. He was also surprised that, despite "three head-snapping launches", the ride was "curiously slow" at times, though he still praised the final launch stating, "[It] sends you over a seemingly small parabola, a stomach-flipping surprise ending." Dewayne Bevil of the Orlando Sentinel positively highlighted the scenic tower, winding maneuvers, and low curves that were akin to slalom skiing. Bevil complimented the ride running smoothly with comfortable over-the-shoulder harnesses, overall stating it "isn't an extreme coaster, but definitely a fun one". Attractions Magazine praised the roller coaster's combination of launches, airtime, and "zig-zag motion".

=== Awards ===
Golden Ticket Awards: Best New Ride for 2011
Ranking	2

Golden Ticket Awards: Top steel Roller Coasters
Year									1998	1999
Ranking									–	–
Year	2000	2001	2002	2003	2004	2005	2006	2007	2008	2009
Ranking	–	–	–	–	–	–	–	–	–	–
Year	2010	2011	2012	2013	2014	2015	2016	2017	2018	2019
Ranking	–	–	–	–	48	37	39	29 (tied)	35	36
Year	2020	2021	2022	2023	2024	2025				
Ranking	N/A	41	–	–	–	–				

== See also ==
- 2011 in amusement parks
- iSpeed, another Intamin LSM Launch Coaster located at Mirabilandia
- Maverick, another Intamin LSM Launch Coaster located at Cedar Point
- Verbolten, a Zierer family launch roller coaster at sister park Busch Gardens Williamsburg
