= Journey to Atlantis =

Water coasters at SeaWorld parks

Journey to Atlantis is the name shared by three water roller coasters located at SeaWorld amusement parks. These attractions, while different in layout and statistics from one another, tell similar stories of a trip to the mythical land of Atlantis. Each ride combines roller coaster elements, such as chain lift hills and steep drops, with boat-based attraction elements, such as splash-down landings. All three attractions were designed by Mack Rides of Germany.

== SeaWorld Orlando ==
Journey to Atlantis
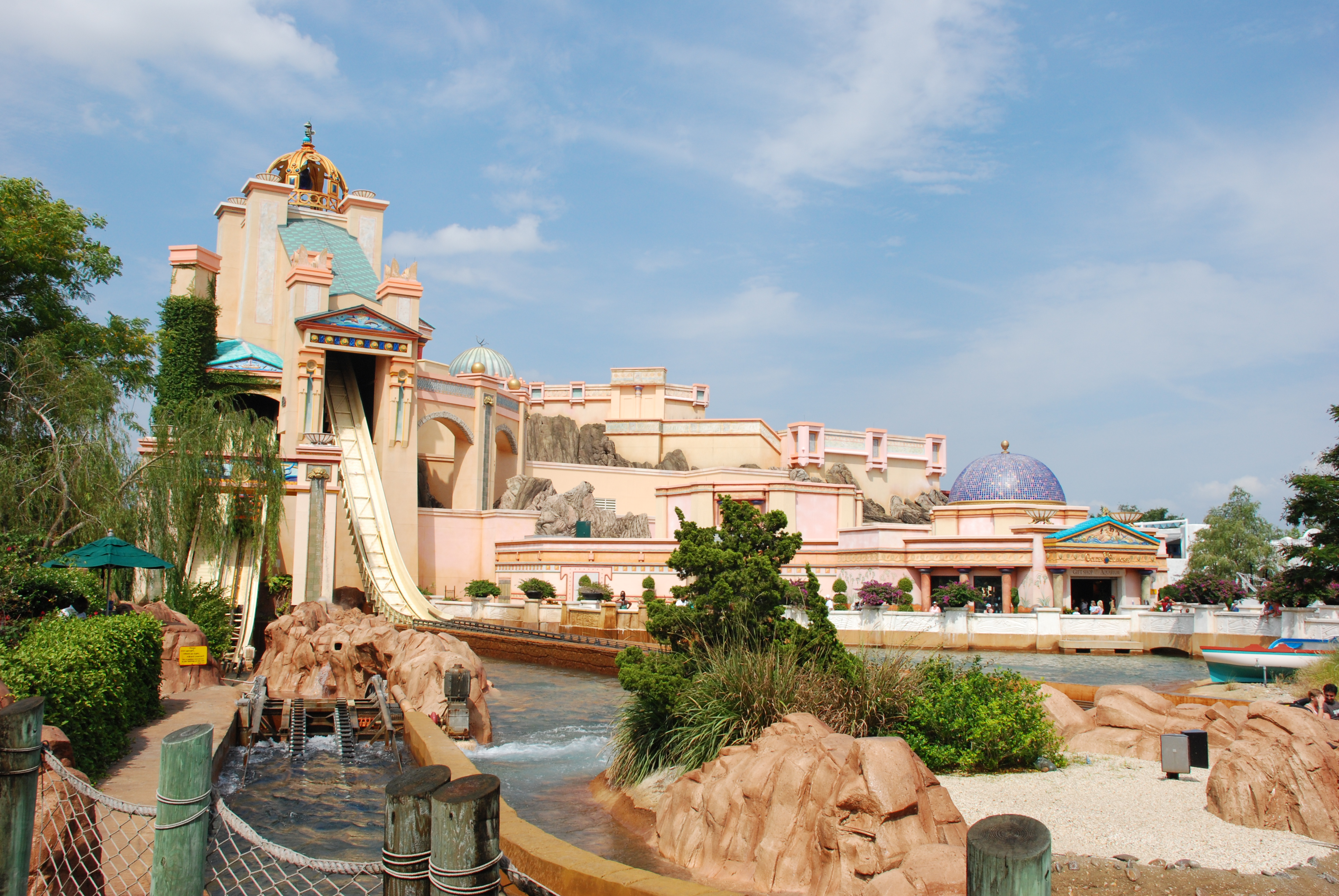

SeaWorld Orlando
- Location: SeaWorld Orlando
- Park section: Sea of Legends
- Coordinates: 28.413042°N 81.459241°W
- Status: Operating
- Opening date: April 17, 1998

General statistics
- Type: Steel
- Manufacturer: Mack Rides
- Model: Water Coaster
- Track layout: Water Coaster
- Lift/launch system: Chain lift hill
- Height: 100 ft (30 m)
- Drop: 60 ft (18 m)
- Inversions: 0
- Duration: 5:56
- Height restriction: 42 in (107 cm)
- Trains: Several trains with a single car; riders arranged 2 across in 4 rows for a total of 8 riders per train
- Animatronics: 5
- Quick Queue available
- Single rider line unavailable
- Journey to Atlantis at RCDB

The original Journey to Atlantis made its debut on April 17, 1998 at SeaWorld Orlando. It is one of the eight roller coasters at the park. Along with Wild Arctic, it was one of the park's only thrill rides until the arrival of Kraken in 2000.

Journey to Atlantis features a small aquarium exhibit known as Jewel of the Sea in its gift shop exit area.

During its seasonal maintenance in March 2017, SeaWorld Orlando greatly altered the ride's theme: all audio and lighting effects featuring Allura the Evil Mermaid and Hermes the Fiber-Optic Seahorse were removed. The musical score and sound effects that once narrated the ride were removed as well, and the ride's score was replaced with a continuous loop of Rick McKee's original score, borrowed from the park's former A'lure – Call of the Ocean live show.

== SeaWorld San Diego ==
Journey to Atlantis
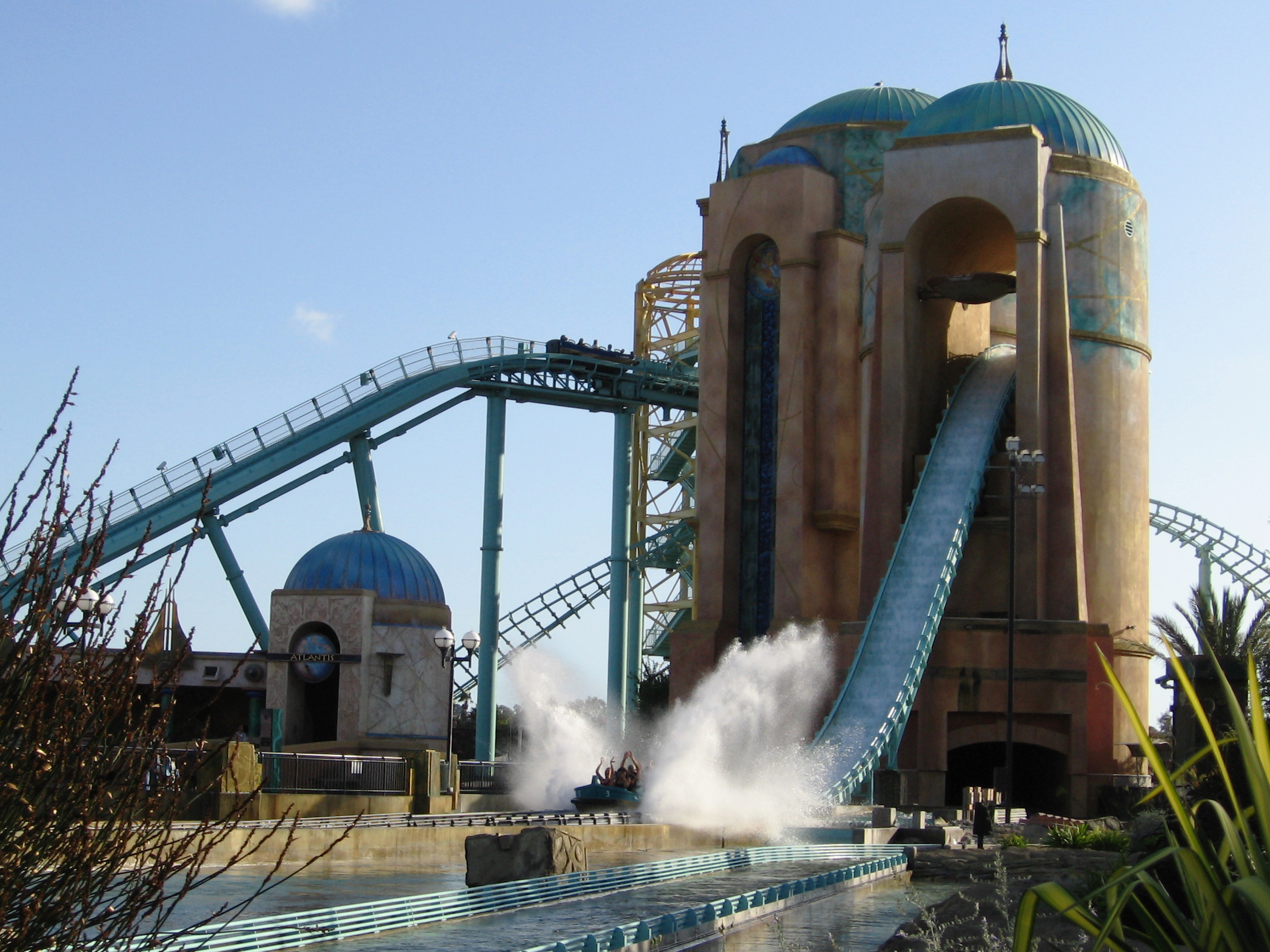

SeaWorld San Diego
- Location: SeaWorld San Diego
- Coordinates: 32°45′50″N 117°13′24″W
- Status: Operating
- Opening date: May 29, 2004
- Cost: $18,555,020

General statistics
- Type: Steel
- Manufacturer: Mack Rides
- Designer: Mack Rides
- Model: Water Coaster
- Lift/launch system: Chain lift hill and elevator lift system
- Height: 95 ft (29 m)
- Drop: 70 ft (21 m)
- Speed: 42 mph (68 km/h)
- Inversions: 0
- Duration: 5:25
- Capacity: 1900 riders per hour
- G-force: 3.0
- Height restriction: 42 in (107 cm)
- Trains: Several trains with a single car; riders arranged 2 across in 4 rows for a total of 8 riders per train
- Quick Queue available
- Single rider line available
- Journey to Atlantis at RCDB

The second Journey to Atlantis opened on May 29, 2004 at SeaWorld San Diego. This version lacks the large interior scenes that the Orlando version includes, but includes more roller coaster elements. In November 2024, SeaWorld San Diego announced that Journey to Atlantis would be receiving refurbishments in 2025.

== SeaWorld San Antonio ==
Journey to Atlantis
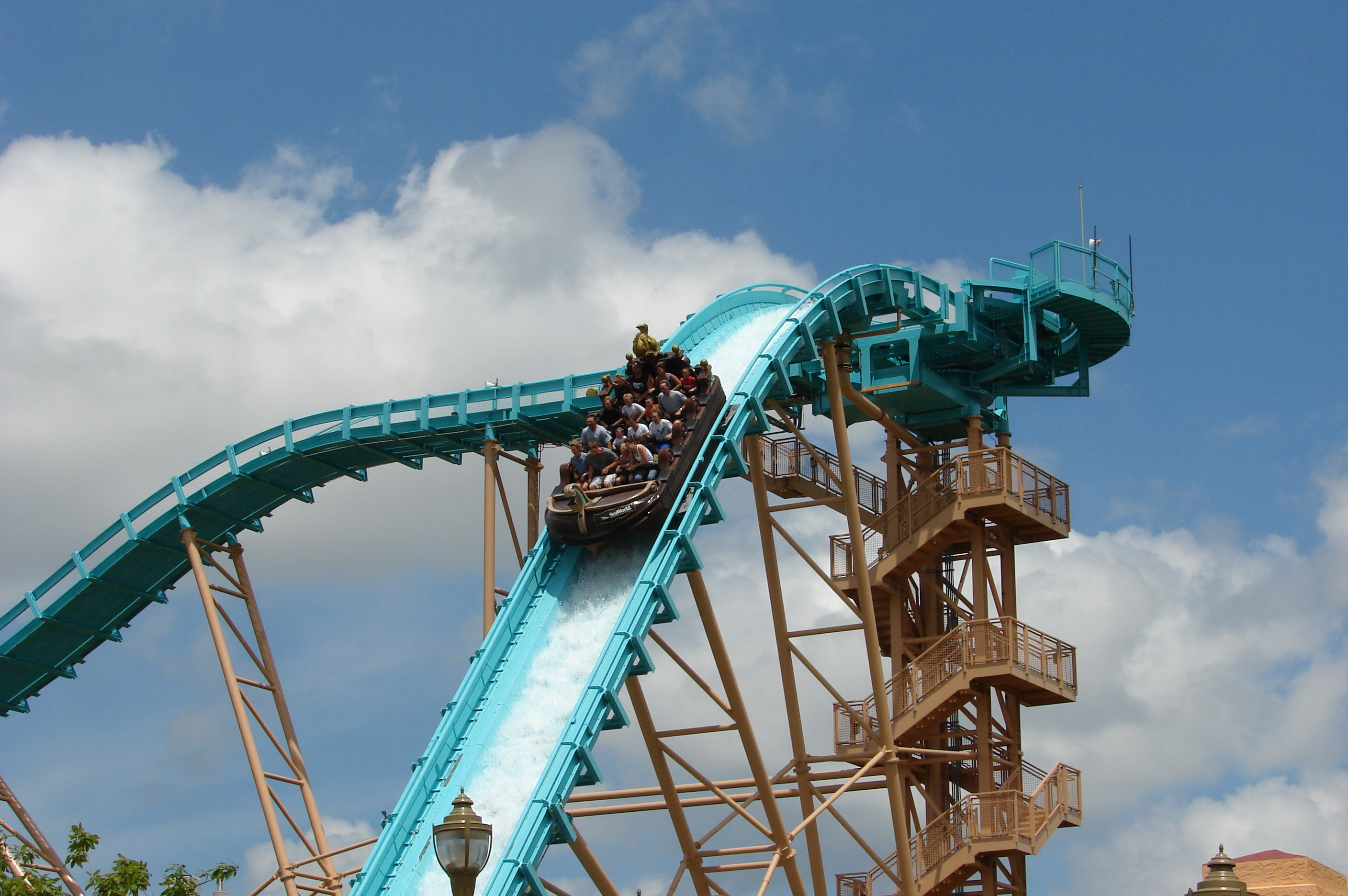

SeaWorld San Antonio
- Location: SeaWorld San Antonio
- Coordinates: 29.454944°N 98.700423°W
- Status: Operating
- Opening date: May 11, 2007

General statistics
- Type: Steel
- Manufacturer: Mack Rides
- Model: SuperSplash
- Lift/launch system: Chain lift hill
- Height: 100 ft (30 m)
- Duration: 3:30
- Height restriction: 40 in (102 cm)
- Trains: Several trains with a single car; riders arranged 4 across in 4 rows for a total of 16 riders per train
- Quick Queue available
- Journey to Atlantis at RCDB

The third Journey to Atlantis opened on May 11, 2007 at SeaWorld San Antonio. First announced in August 2006, this ride is a different model from its two predecessors. Although initial plans called for a more elaborate indoor station and "towers" to enclose the ride's two turntables, SeaWorld San Antonio opted to reduce the number of drops and turns on the ride.

== See also ==
- Storm Coaster
