= Abby's Flower Tower =

Ride at SeaWorld Orlando

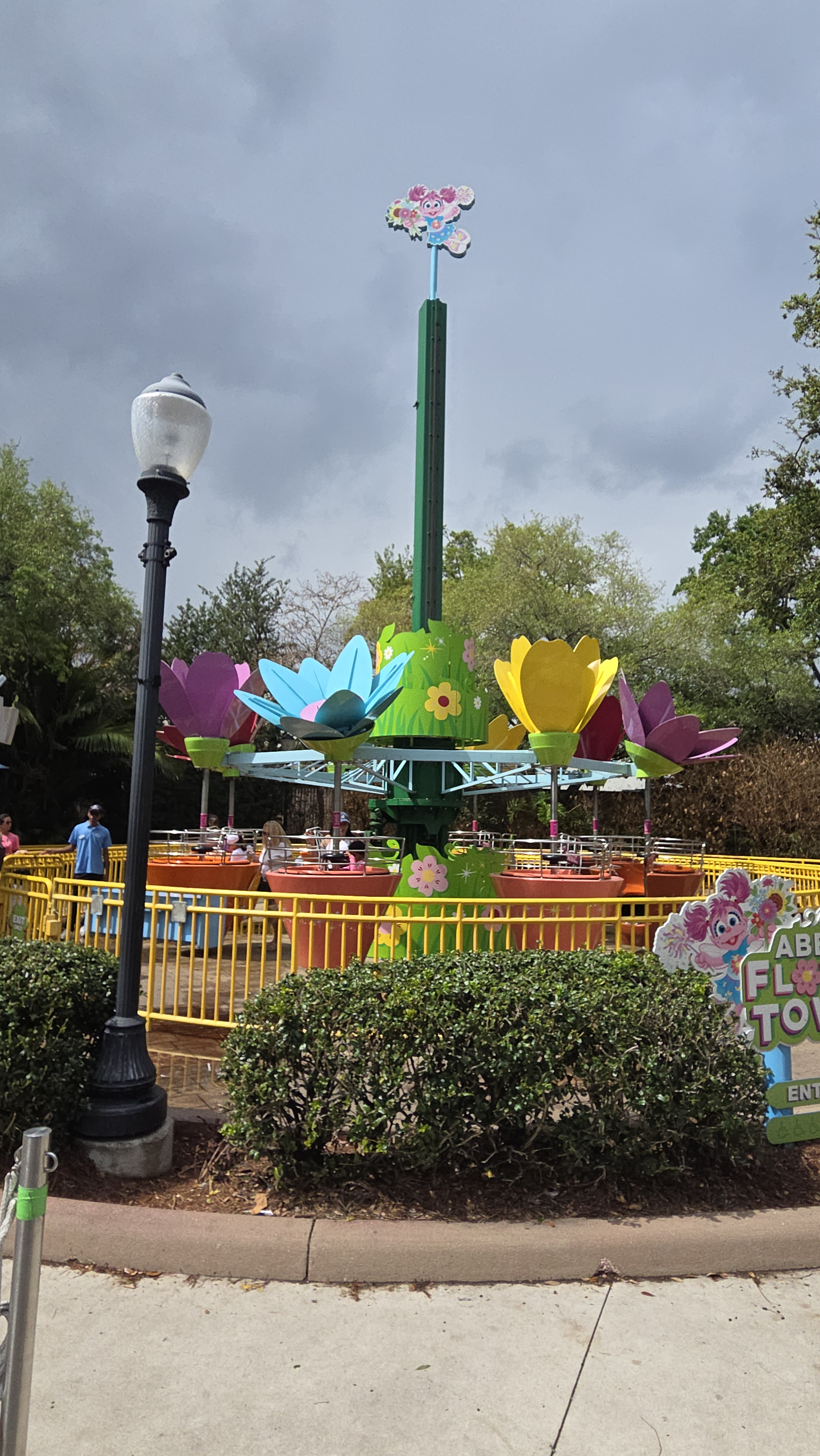
- The ride in March 2026

SeaWorld Orlando
- Status: Operating
- Opening date: 2006 (as Jazzy Jellies); March 27, 2019 (as Abby's Flower Tower)
- Closing date: April 8, 2018 (as Jazzy Jellies)

Ride statistics
- Attraction type: Spinning
- Manufacturer: Zamperla
- Vehicle type: Spinning
- Vehicles: 8

Abby's Flower Tower (formerly Jazzy Jellies) is a flower-themed spinning Balloon Race tower ride located in the Sesame Street section of SeaWorld Orlando in Orlando, Florida. Manufactured by Zamperla, the ride lifts and spins riders at heights of up to 30 feet (9.1 m) in the air.

The ride originally opened to the public in 2006 as Jazzy Jellies, and was themed to jellyfish. It closed in 2018 to undergo a retheme as part of the transition of the Shamu's Happy Harbor area to Sesame Street.

== History ==
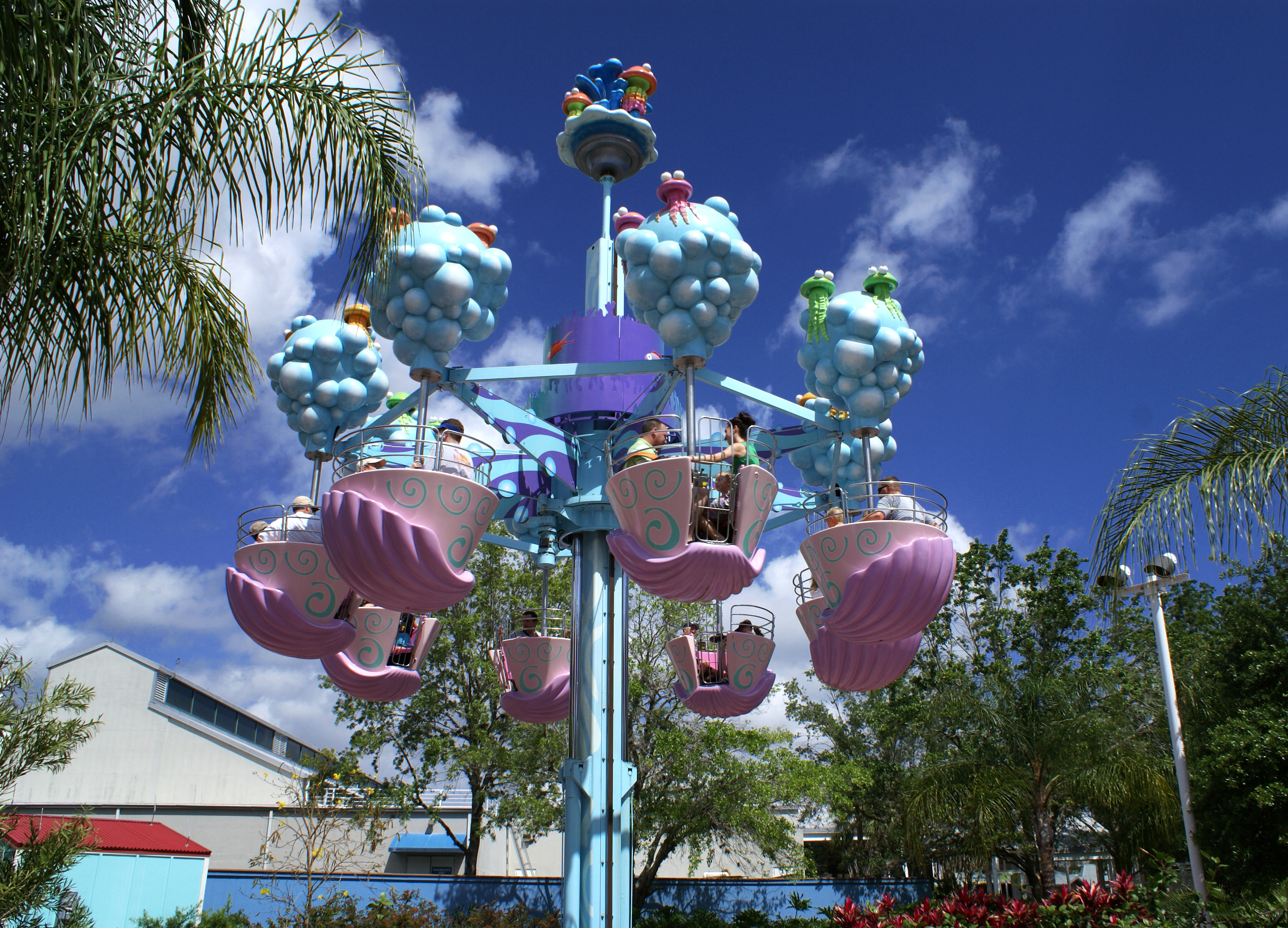
The ride in 2008, when it was known as Jazzy Jellies

In early 2006, SeaWorld Orlando announced plans to add three family rides in a new area called Shamu's Happy Harbor: Jazzy Jellies, Shamu Express (an orca-themed children's roller coaster), and Swishy Fishies (a waterspout-themed teacups ride), as well as several children's play areas.

Jazzy Jellies opened to the public at the end of 2006.

In May 2017, it was announced that Shamu's Happy Harbor would be rethemed to Sesame Street the following year.

On April 8, 2018, Shamu's Happy Harbor closed to begin its conversion. The ride reopened as Abby's Flower Tower on March 27, 2019, along with the rest of the area, which had been renamed Sesame Street.

== Attraction summary ==
Abby's Flower Tower is a spinning ride that lifts up a tower and allows for individual spinning of rider vehicles through the rider's control of a wheel in the middle of each gondola. Each gondola spins separately around the tower as well. There are eight flower pot-themed gondolas for riders, which lift to heights of 30 feet in the air. A ride cycle lasts about one minute. Riders must be at least 42 inches tall or accompanied by a supervising companion at least 14 years old to ride.
