= Infinity Falls =

River rapids ride at SeaWorld Orlando

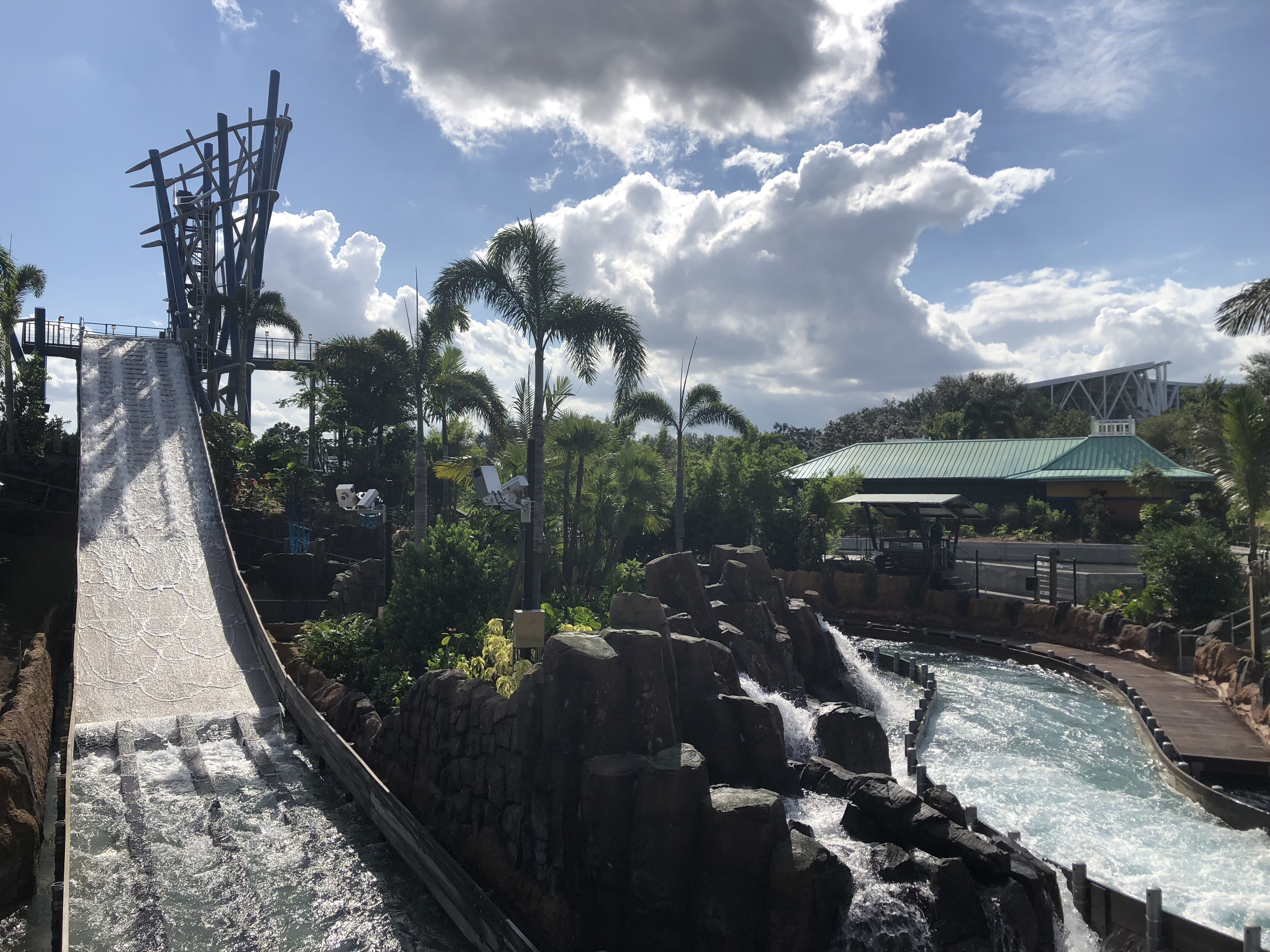
- Infinity Falls drop

SeaWorld Orlando
- Area: Sea of Fun
- Coordinates: 28.4078788°N 81.462298°W
- Status: Operating
- Soft opening date: September 28, 2018
- Opening date: October 4, 2018
- Replaced: Sea Gardens

General statistics
- Manufacturer: Intamin
- Model: River raft ride
- Height: 30 ft (9.1 m)
- Drop: 40 ft (12 m)
- Length: 1,520 ft (460 m)
- Boats: 14 boats. Riders are arranged 4 across in 2 rows for a total of 8 riders per boat.
- Height restriction: 42–77 in (107–196 cm)
- Website: Official website
- Quick Queue available

Infinity Falls is a river rapids ride located at SeaWorld Orlando in Orlando, Florida. Manufactured by Intamin, the ride opened on October 4, 2018, and holds the record for tallest drop on a river rapids ride.

== History ==
On April 13, 2017, SeaWorld Orlando announced Infinity Falls to open in 2018, with park officials comparing the ride to class IV river rapids experiences. On August 10, 2017, SeaWorld Orlando filed a notice of commencement and groundbreaking work began. Permits filed in Orange County, Florida on October 12, 2017 showed further details of construction, with PCL Construction overseeing the work site. The rider rafts were unveiled at the International Association of Amusement Parks and Attractions (IAAPA) Expo in October 2017.

The ride was completely installed by June 20, 2018, but testing and finishing touches were yet to be completed. In July 2018, a promotion was offered by the park to passholders for first access to the attraction. On July 18, 2018, the ride's tower was topped off, and in the same month the park allowed guests to submit names for the rider rafts. By August 2018, it was reported that the ride's delay in opening was attributed to slow testing and poor weather, among several other conditions. On September 19, 2018, the construction walls surrounding the area were removed. Though the ride was still testing, a media day was announced a few days later. Employee testing began on September 27, 2018, and the ride soft opened on September 28, 2018, with an official opening set for October 2018. Infinity Falls officially opened on October 4, 2018.

Upon opening, Infinity Falls took the record for the tallest drop on a river rapids ride at 40 feet, which was previously held by River Quest at Phantasialand with a drop of 36 feet.

== Ride experience ==
The area is themed to the conservation of water. As guests traverse the ride's queue, they are introduced to a story. The story pushes the idea that guests are explorers and scientists, part of the organization "S.E.A. Collective", settled in a wetland camp along a river in a rainforest. A bridge connects the pathway to the area, with totems on either side depicting several animals. Moreover, the connected area has upcharge water cannons that individuals can use to soak people on the ride.

The course takes about 5 minutes to traverse.

== Characteristics ==
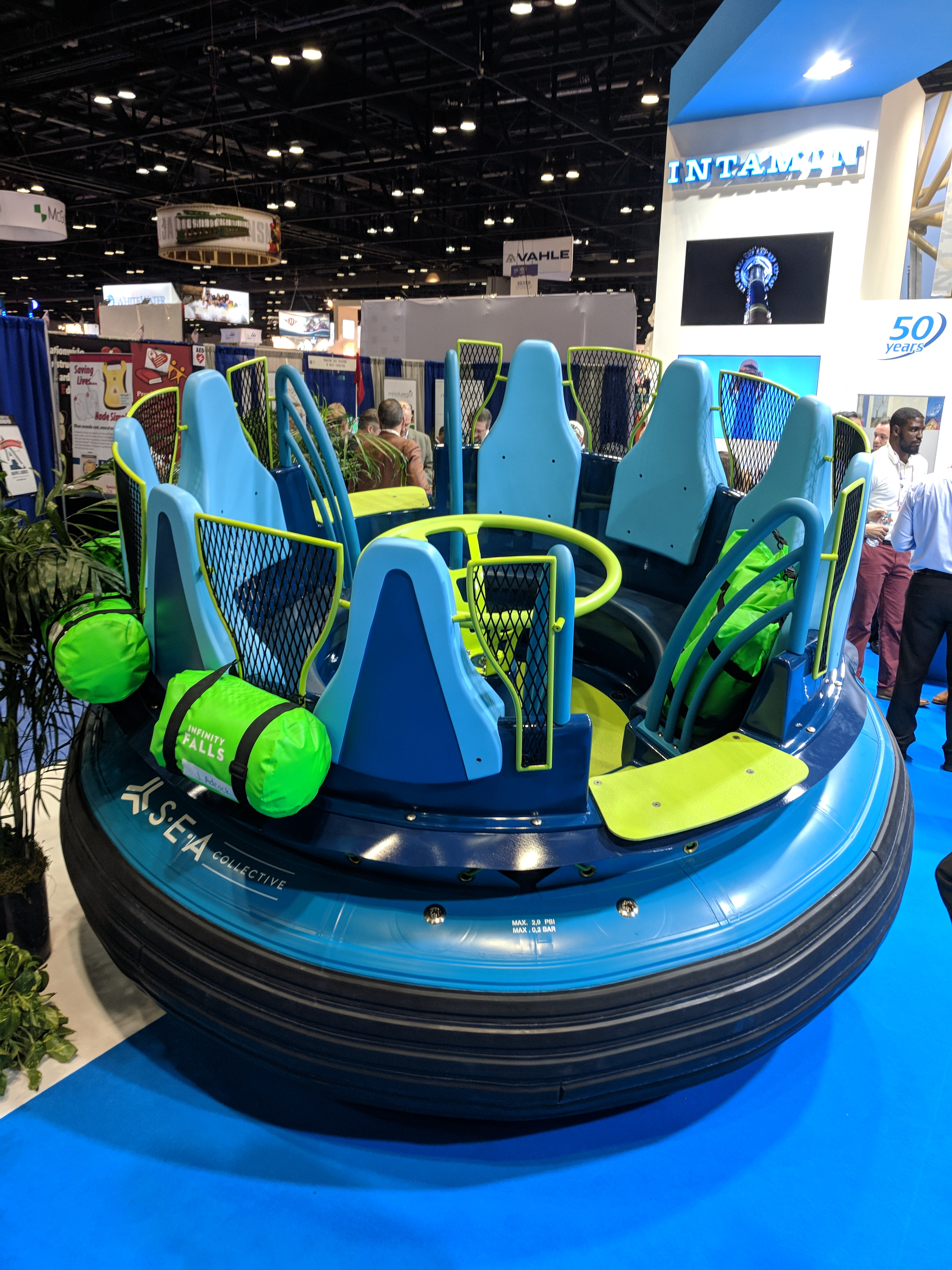
A raft for the ride shown at the Intamin booth at IAAPA Expo in 2017

Infinity Falls is contained within a 2.5 acres (1.0 ha) space located within the Sea of Fun section of the park. It takes five minutes to traverse through the layout trough of 2,100 feet (640 m). Four pumps of 300 horsepower (220,000 W) altogether pump 900,000 U.S. gallons (3,400,000 L) of water.

=== Raft names ===
In addition to being numbered, each raft on Infinity Falls has its own name, most being plays on words related to the ride experience.

1. Winter Blue
2. River Race
3. Flying Colors
4. Blue Paradise
5. Aqua Falls
6. Discovery
7. River Falls
8. Amazon Drop
9. H2O
10. Everfalls
11. Marine Falls
12. Expedition
13. Rafty McRaftFace
14. Sea Señora
15. A Little Nauti
