= Milton Shedd =

American co-founder of SeaWorld (1922–2002)

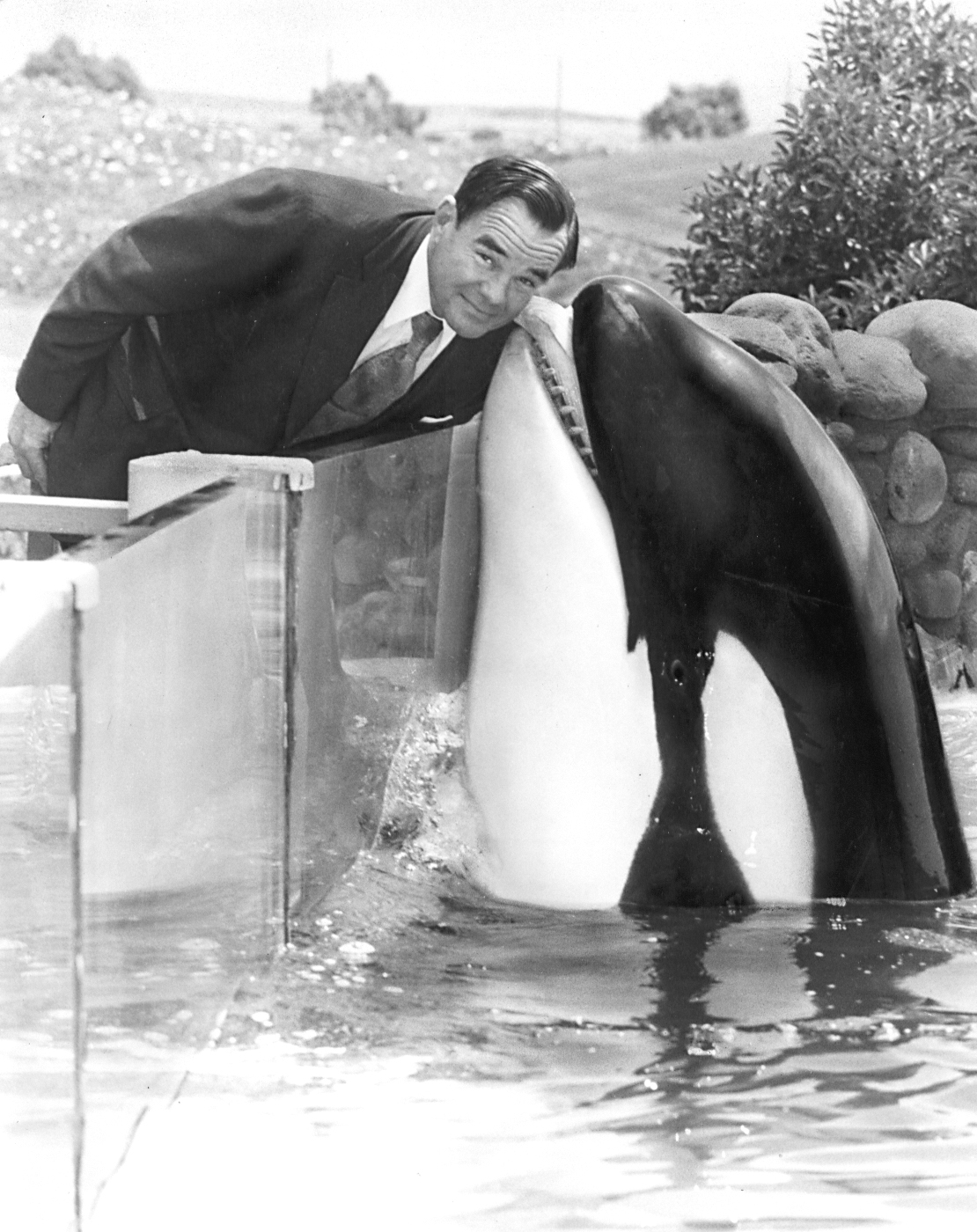
- Milton Shedd with Shamu
- Born: September 26, 1922; El Paso, Texas
- Died: May 24, 2002 (aged 79); Los Angeles, California, US
- Education: University of California, Los Angeles
- Known for: Co-founder of SeaWorld

Milton ‘Milt’ C. Shedd (September 26, 1922 – May 24, 2002) was an American businessman, philanthropist, conservationist, angler, and co-founder of SeaWorld.

== Early life and military service ==
Shedd was born in El Paso, Texas and grew up in Los Angeles, California. Shedd earned a degree in banking and finance from University of California, Los Angeles (UCLA), where he played baseball and football.

Shedd served as an Army officer in the Pacific during World War II where he earned a Silver Star, a Bronze Star, and a Purple Heart.

== SeaWorld ==
In 1964, Shedd and three of his fellow UCLA graduates Ken Norris, David Demott and George Millay founded SeaWorld San Diego. The 22-acre (8.9 ha) park opened on March 21, 1964, with a few dolphins, sea lions, and six attractions. Shedd and other key investors raised $1.5 million (equivalent to $15.6 million in 2025) to open the park.

Shedd served as president and chairman of SeaWorld for 20 years.

Shedd was often referred to by the media as the “Walt Disney of the Sea.”

SeaWord Ohio, opened in 1970, and the Orlando park opened in 1973.

== Axelson Fishing Tackle Company ==
In 1973, Shedd and his wife, Peggie purchased the Axelson Fishing Tackle Company (sometimes known as AFTCO), founded by J.C. Axelson in 1958. Once purchased, the name changed to the America Fishing Tackle Company.

In the 1970s, Shedd along with fellow UCLA alumni and president of Jas. D. Easton, Inc., James L. Easton, developed the company's aluminum rod butt, later named the Unibutt. Shedd and wife Peggie purchased the naming rights to the Unibutt.

In 1989, the company started the Bluewater Wear sports apparel clothing line.

== Philanthropy and conservation ==
In 1963, Shedd founded the non-profit research institution Mission Bay Research Foundation to finance marine research. In 1977, the Foundation was renamed the Hubbs-Sea World Research Institute to honor fishery biologists Carl and Laura Hubbs and their contributions to marine science.

Shedd established the Marine Science Center at UCLA to train teachers to instruct their students about marine life.

Throughout his life, Shedd supported conservation efforts including the elimination of shark longlining off California and restoring the state’s white seabass. Shedd helped create and fund a $4.8 million, 10-acre (4.0 ha) white seabass fish hatchery in Carlsbad, California that opened in October 1995.

== Personal life ==
Shedd is considered a pioneer of live-bait casting for marlin. In 2000, Sport Fishing Magazine credited Shedd and friends with a new and successful method of fishing in 1952: the use of live bait. That same year, Shedd had 10-foot-long custom casting rods made that soon became known throughout Southern California as "Miltie Sticks."

Among the awards Shedd earned for his oceanic endeavors were the lifetime achievement award from the Audubon Society’s Living Oceans Program and the Professional Achievement Award from UCLA. In 2006, Shedd was posthumously inducted into the IGFA Hall of Fame.

Milton Shedd was married to Peggie, and they had three children, Carol, Steve, and Bill. At the time of his passing in 2002, Shedd had nine grandchildren and one great-grandson. Shedd died of cancer at his home in Newport Beach, California in 2002 at the age of 79.
