= SeaWorld Orlando =

Animal theme park in Orlando, Florida

- Previously known as Sea World of Florida

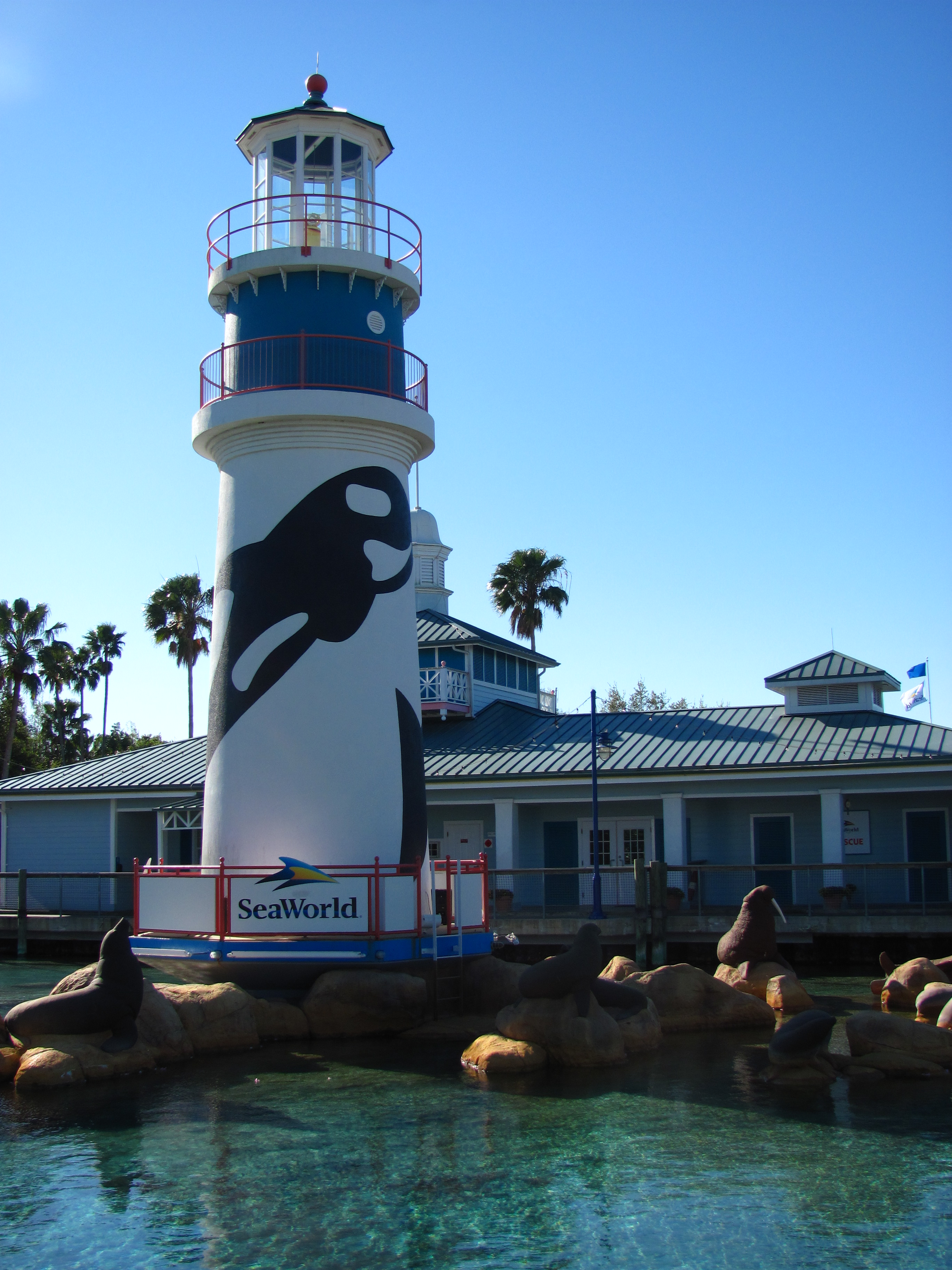
- Lighthouse in the Port of Entry section near the park entrance
- Interactive map of SeaWorld Orlando
- Location: 7007 SeaWorld Drive, Orlando, Florida, United States
- Coordinates: 28°24′39″N 81°27′45″W
- Status: Operating
- Opened: December 15, 1973; 52 years ago
- Owner: United Parks & Resorts
- Operated by: United Parks & Resorts
- Theme: Conservation, the ocean, and aquatic life
- Slogan: "Coaster capital of Orlando!"
- Operating season: Year-round
- Attendance: ▼4.454 million (2022)
- Area: 200 acres (81 ha)

Attractions
- Total: 18
- Roller coasters: 8
- Water rides: 2
- Shows: 5 year-round, 6 seasonal
- Website: seaworld.com/orlando/

SeaWorld Orlando is an animal theme park located just outside Orlando, Florida. Although separately gated, it is often promoted with neighboring parks Discovery Cove and Aquatica as well as Busch Gardens Tampa Bay, all of which are owned and operated by United Parks & Resorts. In 2022, SeaWorld Orlando hosted an estimated 4.45 million guests, ranking it the 10th-most visited amusement park in the United States. SeaWorld Orlando was also featured in the 1983 film Jaws 3-D.

== History ==
SeaWorld Orlando opened on December 15, 1973, as the third park in the SeaWorld chain, and just two years after Walt Disney World Resort's Magic Kingdom debuted. This made Central Florida a multi-park vacation destination. In its earlier years, the park relied more heavily on animal shows to attract visitors, and did not have many rides. SeaWorld was sold in 1976 to Harcourt Brace Jovanovich, and again to Anheuser-Busch, owners of Busch Gardens, in 1989.

Busch was experienced in theme parks and began to develop SeaWorld Orlando in a competitive and aggressive manner, changing it from show-focused to ride-focused. The park installed a simulator ride in 1992 called Mission: Bermuda Triangle (later rethemed to Wild Arctic). The nation's first water coaster, Journey to Atlantis, was installed in 1998. Kraken, a Bolliger & Mabillard floorless roller coaster, was added to the park in 2000. In the 2000s, Busch Entertainment opened two parks adjacent to SeaWorld Orlando: Discovery Cove, an animal park, opened in 2000, followed by Aquatica, a water park, in 2008. The flying coaster Manta, opened at the park in 2009 and won the Theme Park Insider Award as the best new attraction of the year.

In 2008 AB InBev purchased Anheuser-Busch and sold off Busch's parks to private equity firm Blackstone Inc. As a result of this selloff, the Hospitality House and Beer School were closed, and the Clydesdale Hamlet horse area was removed from the park. In 2013, Blackstone sold 37% of SEAS in an initial public offering.

On February 24, 2010, during a "Dine with Shamu" show, the orca Tilikum pulled trainer Dawn Brancheau into the water and killed her. An autopsy confirmed that Brancheau died from blunt force trauma and drowning; injuries included her scalp being removed and her left arm being severed below the shoulder. In August 2010, the United States Department of Labor's Occupational Safety and Health Administration cited SeaWorld of Florida LLC for three safety violations related to the incident. The total penalty was $75,000, and SeaWorld was mandated to install protective barriers between trainers and whales for future shows.

In 2012, SeaWorld Orlando introduced the Turtle Trek exhibit, which featured a 360-degree three-dimensional movie theater. In 2013, the Antarctica: Empire of the Penguin area debuted, including the country's first trackless dark ride alongside a renovated penguin exhibit. The dark ride would operate until 2020. Also in 2013, the film Blackfish was released, bringing to light concerns about the morality of the SeaWorld park chain's captive orcas. The SeaWorld chain claimed the film to be inaccurate, but it suffered lost revenue and attendance in the years immediately after the film's release.

In 2016, the hypercoaster Mako opened to positive reception. In 2019, the park rethemed the "Sea of Fun" area into "Sesame Street Land", themed to the popular children's television series Sesame Street.

In March 2020, the park temporarily ceased operations due to the COVID-19 pandemic. It reopened three months later.

Ice Breaker, a launched coaster manufactured by Premier Rides, opened in 2022 following several years of delays related to the COVID-19 pandemic. Pipeline: The Surf Coaster, a stand-up coaster, opened in 2023. A launched family roller coaster called Penguin Trek opened in 2024, replacing the former Antarctica: Empire of the Penguin ride.

In March 2025, SeaWorld Orlando was fined $16,550 by the United States Department of Labor after a killer whale injured an employee in September 2024. In September 2025, the park announced the addition of SEAQuest: Legends of the Deep, a suspended dark ride. It was originally planned for a 2026 opening date, but has since been pushed back to 2027. In March 2026, the park was sued for mishandling the Sesame Street brand in its themed children's area.

== Park layout ==
In 2014, as part of the SeaWorld company's 50th anniversary, SeaWorld Orlando was separated into different themed areas, called "seas".

- Port of Entry: The main entrance of the park, featuring tropical landscaping and a large artificial freshwater marina with a Shamu-themed lighthouse.
- Sea of Delight: Sea of Delight includes The Waterfront, an area dating back to 2003 which resembles a seaside Mediterranean village. The park's Sky Tower ride is located here. The only land animal show to have been performed at the park, Pets Ahoy, was also held here in the Seaport Theater. Outside of The Waterfront is where the Sea Lion and Otter Stadium viewing area can be found.
- Sea of Fun: Infinity Falls, a river rapids ride installed in 2018, is the main attraction in this area, which holds a loose rainforest theme. Waterway Grill is also housed here.
- Sea of Ice: Sea of Ice was originally named Antarctica, and is themed to the Antarctic continent. Penguin Trek, which replaced Antarctica: Empire of the Penguin, is the main attraction in this area, alongside several penguin exhibits.
- Sea of Legends: Journey to Atlantis, a water coaster, and Kraken, a floorless coaster, are located in the Sea of Legends.
- Sea of Mystery: Sea of Mystery houses the Shark Encounter exhibit and the Shark's Underwater Grill (known altogether as Shark Wreck Reef), as well as the Nautilus Theater, which is used for seasonal shows and events. Mako, a Bolliger & Mabillard steel hypercoaster opened in the area on June 10, 2016. The Flamingo Paddle Boats are also available in this area.
- Sea of Power: Sea of Power is host area of SeaWorld's orca shows. The Shamu Stadium is located in the center, with the Wild Arctic indoor pavilion next door. Wild Arctic is an indoor animal exhibit hosting beluga whales, Pacific walruses, harbor seals, and formerly polar bears. Shamu Stadium currently hosts Orca Encounter as its main show, with Shamu Celebration: Light up the Night and Shamu Christmas Miracles showing seasonally. Also found in Sea of Power are Ice Breaker and Pipeline: The Surf Coaster.
- Sea of Shallows: This area showcases most of the shallow water sea animal exhibits, as well as the Dolphin Theater. The Manta roller coaster travels through this section, and the former Turtle Trek was housed here. Key West at SeaWorld is located in the Sea of Shallows, designed to mimic the appearance of the city of Key West with architecture and landscaping reminiscent of the area. Animal exhibits in this portion of the park include lesser devil rays, cownose rays, southern stingrays, green sea turtles, hawksbill sea turtles, loggerhead sea turtles, bottlenose dolphins, greater flamingos, West Indian manatees, American alligators, and brown pelicans. In addition to native species, invasive fish found in Florida such as the alligator gar, redtail catfish, and black pacu can also be viewed here. The stingray and dolphin habitats offer opportunities for guests to feed the animals.
- Sesame Street: Formerly known as Shamu's Happy Harbor from 2006 to 2018, Sesame Street is a children's area located adjacent to Shamu Stadium and features family activities, rides for small children, and a water play area. It was rethemed to the educational children's television program Sesame Street in 2019.

== Attractions ==
SeaWorld Orlando has many live shows and attractions including rides and animal exhibits. Many of these attractions, such as Manta and Penguin Trek, combine the two, with animal exhibits being featured in the rides' queues and exit areas.

=== Roller coasters ===
Name	Opened	Description	Location
Journey to Atlantis	1998	A steel water roller coaster with dark ride elements, themed to the mythical lost city of Atlantis. The queue also features several fish and aquarium exhibits. Built by Mack Rides.	Sea of Legends
Kraken (formerly Kraken Unleashed)	2000	A steel floorless roller coaster themed to the legend of the Kraken sea monster, standing 153 feet (47 m) high and featuring seven inversions. Known as Kraken Unleashed in 2017 and 2018, and featured VR headsets during this time. Built by Bolliger & Mabillard.	Sea of Legends
Super Grover's Box Car Derby (formerly Shamu Express)	2006	A steel children's roller coaster themed to Super Grover from Sesame Street. Known as Shamu Express from 2006 to 2018. Did not operate during the 2018 season, and was rethemed to Super Grover in 2019. Built by Zierer.	Sesame Street
Manta	2009	A steel flying roller coaster. Riders are held parallel to the ground and the sky in "flying" and "lying" positions, respectively, while riding. The ride is 140 feet (43 m) tall, and features top speeds of 56 miles per hour (90 km/h) with 4 inversions. Several animal exhibits can be viewed in the ride's queue. Built by Bolliger & Mabillard.	Sea of Shallows
Mako	2016	A steel hyper roller coaster named after the fastest species of shark. Standing 200 feet (61 m) tall and reaching of 73 miles per hour (117 km/h), Mako is the tallest and fastest roller coaster in Orlando. Built by Bolliger & Mabillard.	Sea of Mystery
Ice Breaker	2022	A steel multi-launched roller coaster. The 93-foot (28 m) tall ride features a 100° drop, the steepest drop of any roller coaster in Florida. The ride launches passengers backwards up a slight incline, forwards, and backwards again, building speed with magnetic launch systems, before finally gathering enough speed to launch forwards a final time, traveling over a top hat and into the rest of the layout. Built by Premier Rides.	Sea of Power
Pipeline: The Surf Coaster	2023	A steel launched stand-up roller coaster. Pipeline: The Surf Coaster was the first of a new generation of stand-up coaster models known as Surf Coasters. It stands 110 feet (34 m) tall, and features speeds of 60 miles per hour (97 km/h) and one inversion. Unlike typical stand-up coasters, whose seats remain in place throughout the ride, Pipeline: The Surf Coaster features hydraulic seating elements, giving riders the sensation of riding a wave as the seats move up and down on the train through elements. Built by Bolliger & Mabillard.	Sea of Power/Port of Entry
Penguin Trek	2024	A steel multi-launched roller coaster with dark ride elements, featuring speeds of up to 45 miles per hour (72 km/h). The ride has a preshow section and two launches, as well as a heavily themed queue. Several penguin exhibits can be viewed in an area called Antarctica Realm as one exits the ride. Built by Bolliger & Mabillard.	Sea of Ice

=== Rides ===
Name	Opened	Description	Location
Sky Tower	1974	A 400-foot (120 m) tall rotating gyro tower, the park's first ride, and the tallest ride at the park. An additional fee is required to ride.	Sea of Delight
Flamingo Paddle Boats	1978	Flamingo-themed boats which riders can paddle around the park's main lake. An additional fee is required to ride.	Sea of Mystery
Infinity Falls	2018	A river rapids ride featuring a vertical elevator lift and the world's tallest drop on a ride of its kind. Built by Intamin.	Sea of Fun
Expedition Odyssey: Fire and Ice	2025	A flying theater that utilizes sounds, temperature, and smells to immerse riders in an arctic landscape. Took the place of the old Wild Arctic building. Home to an animal experience called Expedition Odyssey Animal Habitat. Built by Mack Rides.	Sea of Power
SEAQuest: Legends of the Deep	Under construction, expected 2027 opening	A suspended dark ride. Built by Vekoma.	Sea of Power

=== Children's rides ===
Name	Opened	Description	Location
Abby's Flower Tower (formerly Jazzy Jellies)	2006	A Balloon Race ride themed to Abby Cadabby from Sesame Street. Previously themed to jellyfish from 2006 to 2018. Rethemed to Sesame Street in 2019.	Sesame Street
Cookie Drop! (formerly Flying Fiddler)	2007	A drop tower ride themed to Cookie Monster from Sesame Street. Previously themed to a giant fiddler crab from 2007 to 2018. Rethemed to Sesame Street in 2019.	Sesame Street
Slimey's Slider (formerly Ocean Commotion)	2007	A Rockin' Tug ride themed to Slimey the Worm from Sesame Street. Previous theme was held from 2007 to 2018. Rethemed to Sesame Street in 2019. Built by Zamperla.	Sesame Street
Sunny Day Carousel (formerly Sea Carousel)	2007	A carousel themed to Sesame Street with colorful Muppet versions of horses. Previously themed to sea creatures with marine mammals and fish. Rethemed and incorporated into the Sesame Street area in 2021.	Sesame Street
Elmo's Choo Choo Train (formerly Seven Seas Railway)	2012	A miniature train ride themed to Elmo from Sesame Street. Previously themed to aquatic animals and sea creatures from 2012 to 2018. Rethemed to Sesame Street in 2019.	Sesame Street

=== Attractions ===
Name	Opened	Description	Location
Rosita's Harmony Hills	2019	A children's play area themed to Rosita from Sesame Street	Sesame Street
Rubber Duckie Water Works	2019	A children's water play area themed to Ernie from Sesame Street	Sesame Street

=== Live entertainment and animal presentations ===
Name	Opened	Description	Location
Dolphin Stadium	1973	The 2,000,000 US gallons (7,600,000 L) Dolphin Stadium, which was originally the Shamu Stadium, hosts the Dolphin Adventures and Dolphins: Touch the Sky educational shows. Dolphin Stadium features dolphins. It previously incorporated macaws, marabou storks, and Andean condors in Blue Horizons, a show that debuted on May 29, 2005 and lasted until March 31, 2017, to be replaced with Dolphin Days on April 1, 2017. Dolphin Days lasted until late February 2021. False killer whales were also part of Dolphin Stadium until the eventual deaths of the park's two specimens. Four rescued pilot whales were also housed here until they were moved to the Shamu Stadium on April 28, 2017 to allow them more space. On September 16, 2019, three pilot whales were transferred to SeaWorld San Diego.	Sea of Shallows
Bayside Stadium	1983	A stage used for SeaWorld's numerous concert series and other special events, as well as the official viewing area for the summer seasonal Electric Ocean fireworks show and dance party, as well as the Winter Wonderland On Ice ice skating show during the winter. Formerly hosted water skiing shows on the park's central lagoon.	Sea of Power
Shamu Stadium	1984	The 7,000,000 US gallons (26,000,000 L) home to the park's four orcas opened in September 1984. The park's main show held here has been Orca Encounter since late 2019. The Shamu Stadium also houses the summer seasonal night show Shamu's Celebration: Light Up The Night and winter seasonal night show Shamu Christmas Miracles. It formerly held the show One Ocean. An educational presentation called Ocean Discovery was also presented on select dates in the past. Has special areas for the Dine with Orcas and Orca Underwater Viewing experiences.	Sea of Power
Sea Lion and Otter Stadium	1990	Home to Clyde and Seamore, a pair of California sea lions who star in the presentation Sea Lions: Flippers, Facts & Fun. Asian small-clawed otters and a Northern elephant seal also partake in the show. This production was formerly joined by the seasonal show Sea Lions Tonite. Sea Lion and Otter Spotlight was formerly held here as well.	Sea of Delight
Nautilus Theater	1995	Originally was home to an acrobatic show similar to Cirque du Soleil called A'lure: The Call of The Ocean, which performed until early 2015. Was also used for a summer bubble show named Pop in 2017 and 2018, and for a show called O Wondrous Night during the winter.	Sea of Mystery
Seaport Theater	1998	Formerly featured animals that have been rescued from local animal shelters in Pets Ahoy which was cut in 2020 due to budget cuts affiliated with the loss of revenue due to COVID-19. This venue was also home to Abby's Treasure Hunt and many seasonal Sesame Street shows before Sesame Street land opened.	Sea of Delight
Seafire Grill	2001	A restaurant with a theater in the style of dinner theater. This venue was home to the Makahiki Luau dancing show until its closure in September 2012.	
Ignite	2006	A seasonal firework show held over the park's central lagoon, known as Reflections until 2017, featuring fireworks, dancing fountains, and mist screens synchronized to musical soundtracks of some of the park's shows and attractions. The show was also formerly called Mistify. During the holidays, there is a Holiday Reflections fireworks show held here.	
Sesame Street Party Parade	2019	A duplicate of the existing parade at Sesame Place parks, featuring several costumed Sesame Street characters. There is an interactive show stop where guests are invited into the parade route to dance with the characters. Halloween and Christmas overlays occur during their respective seasons.	Sesame Street
SeaWorld Coral Rescue Center	2023	An indoor and outdoor exhibit featuring sea turtles, West Indian manatees, and American alligators. From 2012 to 2022, the building held the Turtle Trek attraction. In 2023, it was repurposed into the SeaWorld Coral Rescue Center, the largest public-facing facility dedicated to coral conservation in the country.	Sea of Shallows
Alligator Habitat	N/A	An outdoor habitat for juvenile American alligators adjacent to the SeaWorld Rescue Center	
Dolphin Cove	N/A	Hosts the Dolphin Encounter animal experience	
Dolphin Nursery	N/A	Home to mother dolphins and their calves	
Flamingo Cove	N/A	Home to a flamboyance of American flamingos	
Jewel of the Sea Aquarium	N/A	An indoor aquarium located in the exit for Journey to Atlantis	Sea of Legends
Manta Aquarium	N/A	An indoor manta exhibit	
Pacific Point Preserve	N/A	Home to several sea lions	
Pelican Preserve	N/A	Home to several rehabilitated white and brown pelicans	
SeaWorld Rescue Center	N/A	Home to the Manatee Rehabilitation Area	
Shark Wreck Reef	N/A	Contains a shark exhibit known as Shark Encounter, as well as a restaurant known as Shark's Underwater Grill. Located near Mako.	Sea of Mystery
Stingray Lagoon	N/A	A touch-tank experience where visitors can touch and feed cownose rays	

=== Former attractions ===
Name	Opened	Closed
World of the Sea Aquarium/Tropical Reef	1973	2008
Penguin Encounter	1987	2012
Mission: Bermuda Triangle	1992	1995
Hospitality Center	1992	2009
Clydesdale Hamlet	1992	2009
Manatees: The Last Generation?/Manatee Rescue	1993	2011
Wild Arctic	1995	2020
Big Bird's Twirl 'N' Whirl (formerly Swishy Fishies)	2006	2023
Animal Connections at SeaGarden	2010	2017
Turtle Trek	2012	2020
Antarctica: Empire of the Penguin	2013	2020
Count-Around Playground	2019	2019

== Attendance ==
Year	Attendance	Worldwide rank
2008	5,926,000	7th
2009	5,800,000	7th
2010	5,100,000	9th
2011	5,202,000	9th
2012	5,358,000	19th
2013	5,090,000	19th
2014	4,683,000	21st
2015	4,777,000	22nd
2016	4,402,000	25th
2017	3,962,000	26th
2018	4,594,000	26th
2019	4,640,000	26th
2020	1,598,000	N/A
2021	3,051,000	N/A
2022	4,450,000	10th

== See also ==
- Incidents at SeaWorld Orlando
- Florida tourism industry
