= Kenneth S. Norris =

American marine biologist

Kenneth Stafford Norris

Kenneth Stafford Norris (August 11, 1924 – August 16, 1998) was an American marine mammal biologist, conservationist, naturalist, and co-founder of SeaWorld.

Norris did pioneering work on dolphin echolocation. His conservation work included helping establish the University of California Natural Reserve System and work towards passage of the Marine Mammal Protection Act. Norris was a professor at UCLA and UC Santa Cruz.

Norris, Milton Shedd, David Demott and George Millay co-founded SeaWorld. The four graduates of UCLA originally set out to build an underwater restaurant and marine life show. When the underwater restaurant concept was deemed unfeasible, they scrapped those plans and decided to build a park instead, and SeaWorld San Diego was opened on March 21, 1964.

== Selected bibliography ==
- Norris, Kenneth Stafford (1974). The Porpoise Watcher. ISBN 9780393063851.
- Norris, Kenneth Stafford (1991). Dolphin Days: The Life & Times of the Spinner Dolphin. ISBN 9780380719655.

=== as editor ===
- Norris, Kenneth S., ed. (1966). Whales, Dolphins and Porpoises. Proceedings of the 1st International Symposium on Cetacean Research, held in August 1963 in Washington, D.C.; conducted by the American Institute of Biological Sciences. University of California Press; xv+789 pages, illus., maps, 26 cm. ASIN B0000CN4XU

== External links and further reading ==
- Kenneth S. Norris, naturalist, cetologist & conservationist, 1924-1998: an oral history biography. Interviewed by Randall Jarrell and Irene Reti. Regional History Project, University Library, UC Santa Cruz. 1999
- Marine Mammal Science, Oct. 1999, v.15(4). Special issue remembering Dr. Norris.
- Photographs of Ken Norris from the UC Santa Cruz Library's Digital Collections
