= Sunny Day Carousel =

Carousel at SeaWorld Orlando

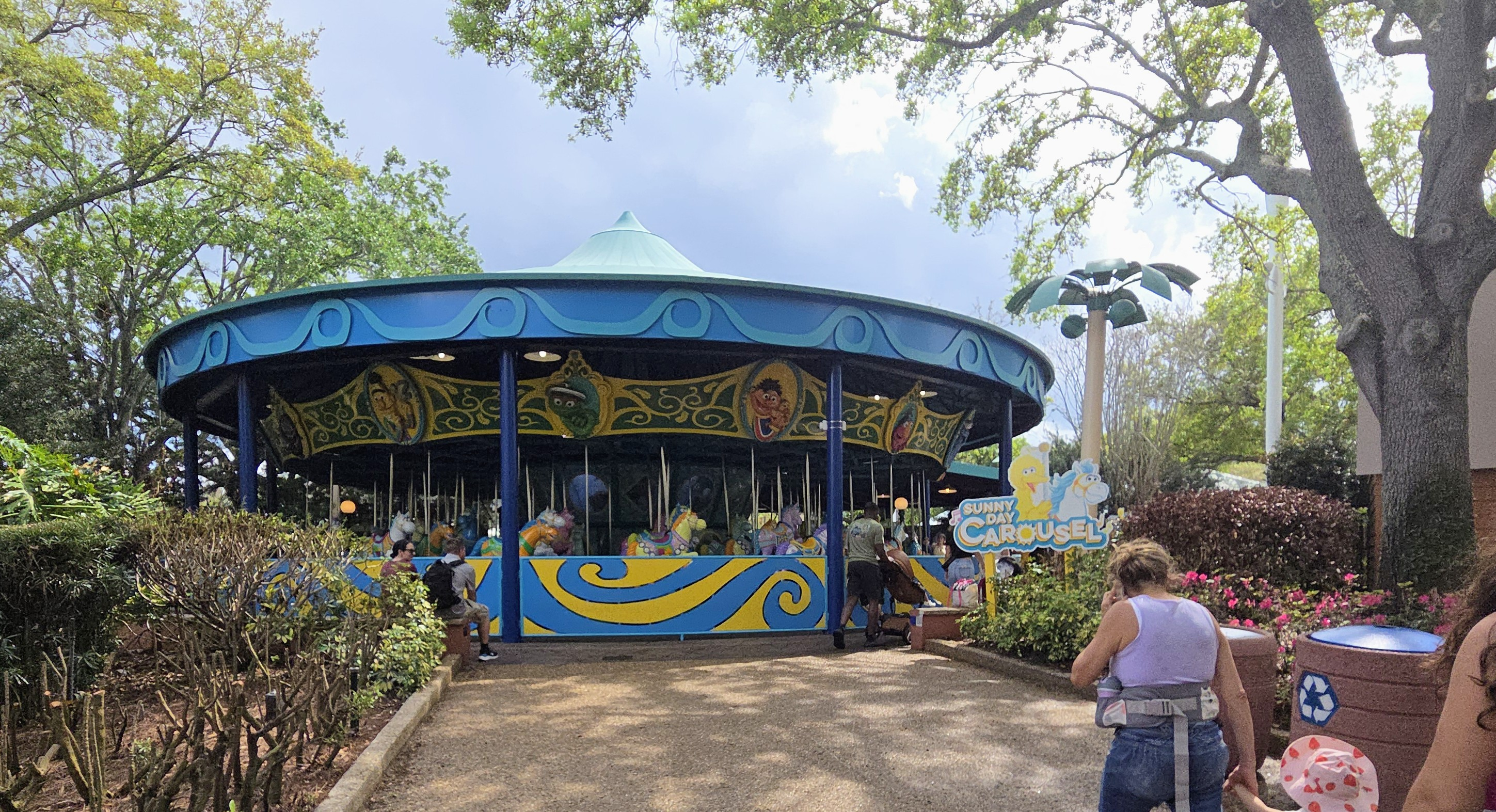
- The ride in March 2026.

SeaWorld Orlando
- Area: Sesame Street Land
- Status: Operating
- Opening date: 2007 (as Sea Carousel); November 24, 2021 (as Sunny Day Carousel)
- Closing date: 2021 (as Sea Carousel)

Ride statistics
- Attraction type: Carousel
- Manufacturer: Chance Rides
- Music: Organ
- Vehicle type: Sea animals (Sea Carousel); Horses (Sunny Day Carousel)
- Vehicles: 65
- Riders per vehicle: 1
- Duration: 2 minutes
- Wheelchair accessible

Sunny Day Carousel (formerly Sea Carousel) is a Sesame Street-themed carousel located in the Sesame Street section of SeaWorld Orlando in Orlando, Florida. Manufactured by Chance Rides, riders board Muppet-esque horses and glide up and down as the carousel revolves.

The ride originally opened to the public as Sea Carousel in 2007.

== History ==
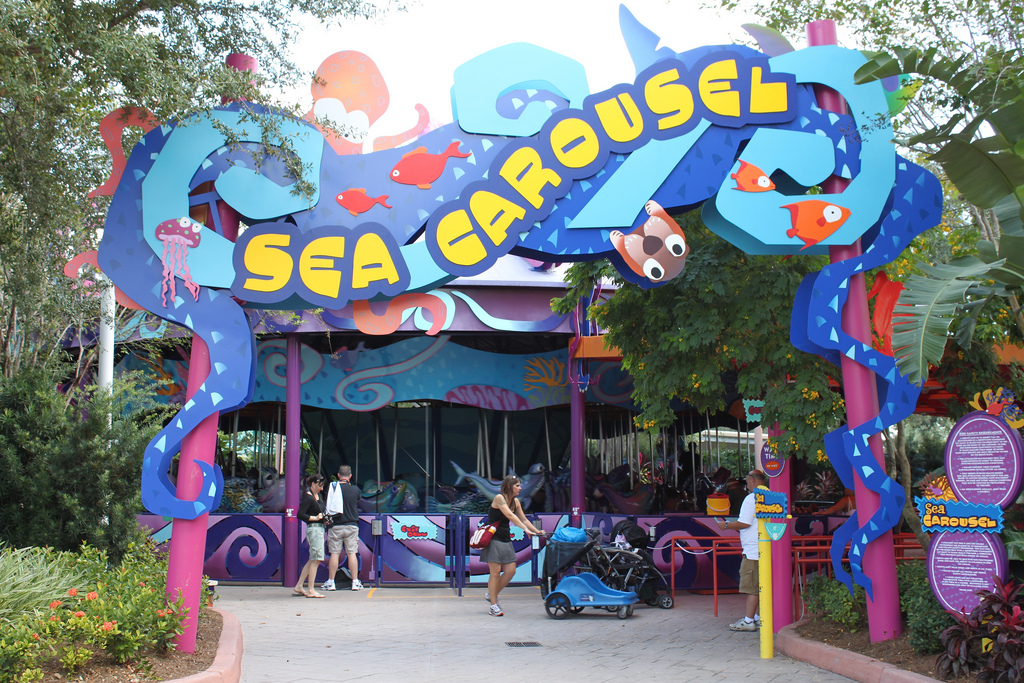
The ride as Sea Carousel

In 2006, SeaWorld Orlando added a new children's section to the park, called Shamu's Happy Harbor. The area contained small rides and play areas intended for younger children.

The following year, park authority announced plans to add a sea-based carousel in the section, which would be expanded to four acres. The carousel officially opened to the public in summer 2007. The carousel featured various sea creatures for riders to sit on.

When Shamu's Happy Harbor was rethemed to Sesame Street in 2019, Sea Carousel remained unchanged. It was not rethemed to the Sunny Day Carousel until 2021. It reopened under its new theme on November 24, 2021. The sea creatures were replaced by Muppet horses.

== Ride experience ==
Sunny Day Carousel features steeds modeled after Muppet horses. The duration of the ride is about two minutes. Riders must be at least 42 inches tall or accompanied by a supervising companion at least 14 years old to ride.
