= Kraken (roller coaster) =

Roller coaster at SeaWorld Orlando

- Previously known as Kraken Unleashed (2017–2018)

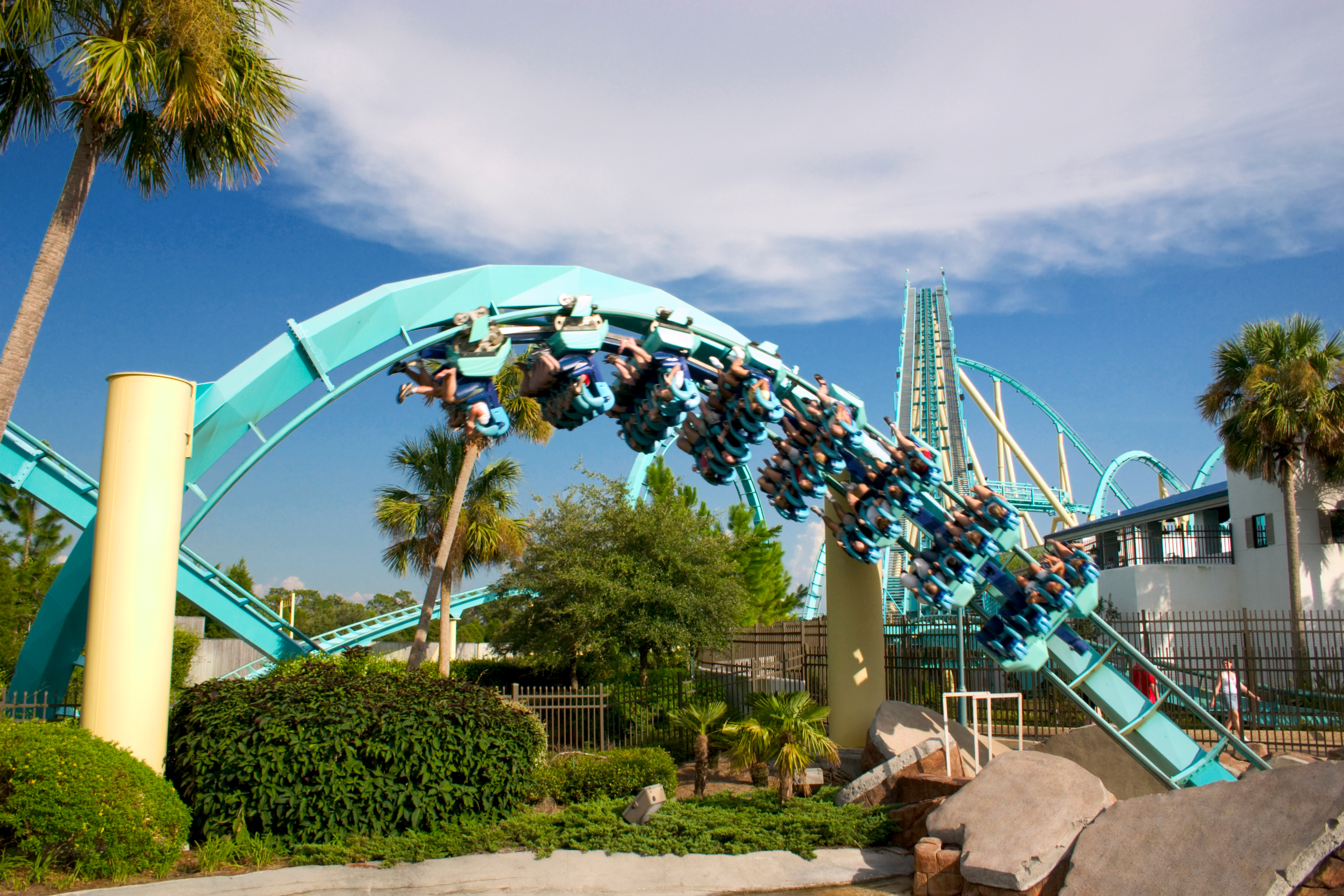
- Kraken in 2003

SeaWorld Orlando
- Location: SeaWorld Orlando
- Park section: Sea of Legends
- Coordinates: 28°24′40″N 81°27′30″W
- Status: Operating
- Soft opening date: May 27, 2000
- Opening date: June 1, 2000

General statistics
- Type: Steel – Floorless Coaster
- Manufacturer: Bolliger & Mabillard
- Designer: Werner Stengel
- Model: Custom
- Lift/launch system: Chain lift hill
- Height: 153 ft (47 m)
- Drop: 144 ft (44 m)
- Length: 4,177 ft (1,273 m)
- Speed: 65 mph (105 km/h)
- Inversions: 7
- Duration: 2:02
- Capacity: 1500 riders per hour
- Height restriction: 54 in (137 cm)
- Trains: 3 trains with 8 cars; riders arranged 4 across in a single row for a total of 32 riders per train
- Quick Queue available
- Must transfer from wheelchair
- Kraken at RCDB

Kraken is a steel roller coaster at SeaWorld Orlando in Orlando, Florida, United States. Manufactured by Bolliger & Mabillard, the ride opened as the second longest floorless coaster in the world on June 1, 2000, with a track length measuring 4,177 feet (1,273 m). It features a total of seven inversions and reaches a maximum speed of 65 mph (105 km/h). The coaster is themed to a fictional sea monster of the same name, and is located in the Sea of Legends section of the park. In late 2016, Kraken underwent a refurbishment and reopened as Kraken Unleashed in June 2017. A virtual reality experience was added to the ride, but due to technical difficulties and extensive wait times, the feature was permanently removed after only two seasons.

== History ==
=== Kraken (2000–2016, 2018-present) ===
SeaWorld Orlando announced plans to install a floorless coaster in 2000 on May 6, 1999. Kraken was originally planned to cost approximately $18–20 million. Its announcement more than one year out from its opening was an attempt by the park to drive international attendance.

Construction for the ride was well underway in January 2000. During construction, Superior Rigging & Erection was responsible for erecting the supports and track of the roller coaster.

On June 1, 2000, Kraken officially opened to the public. At the time of opening, Kraken held the record for the tallest and longest roller coaster in the state of Florida. It held the latter record until 2006 when Disney's Animal Kingdom opened the 4,424-foot-long (1,348 m) Expedition Everest.

In 2022, Kraken was repainted with seafoam green track and dark teal supports.

=== Kraken Unleashed (2017–2018) ===
On September 27, 2016, the park announced that the ride would undergo extensive refurbishment and reopen in 2017 with virtual reality headsets. It reopened as Kraken Unleashed on June 16, 2017. This update also featured an original orchestral score by Rick McKee for the VR film, as well as original music that played in the ride's area. In early 2018, the virtual reality headsets were removed from the attraction’s ride vehicles, and the ride reverted to the Kraken name due to technical difficulties with the headsets. The headsets returned to the ride in June 2018. Later in the summer of 2018, the virtual reality headsets were permanently removed from the ride due to causing slow dispatches and excessive wait times.

== Characteristics ==
=== Statistics ===
The 4,177-foot-long (1,273 m) Kraken stands 153 feet (47 m) tall. With a top speed of 65 miles per hour (105 km/h), the ride was the fastest roller coaster at SeaWorld Orlando until the opening of Mako in June 2016. The ride features seven inversions, including two vertical loops, a dive loop, a zero-g roll, a cobra roll, a corkscrew, and a flat spin.

=== Trains ===
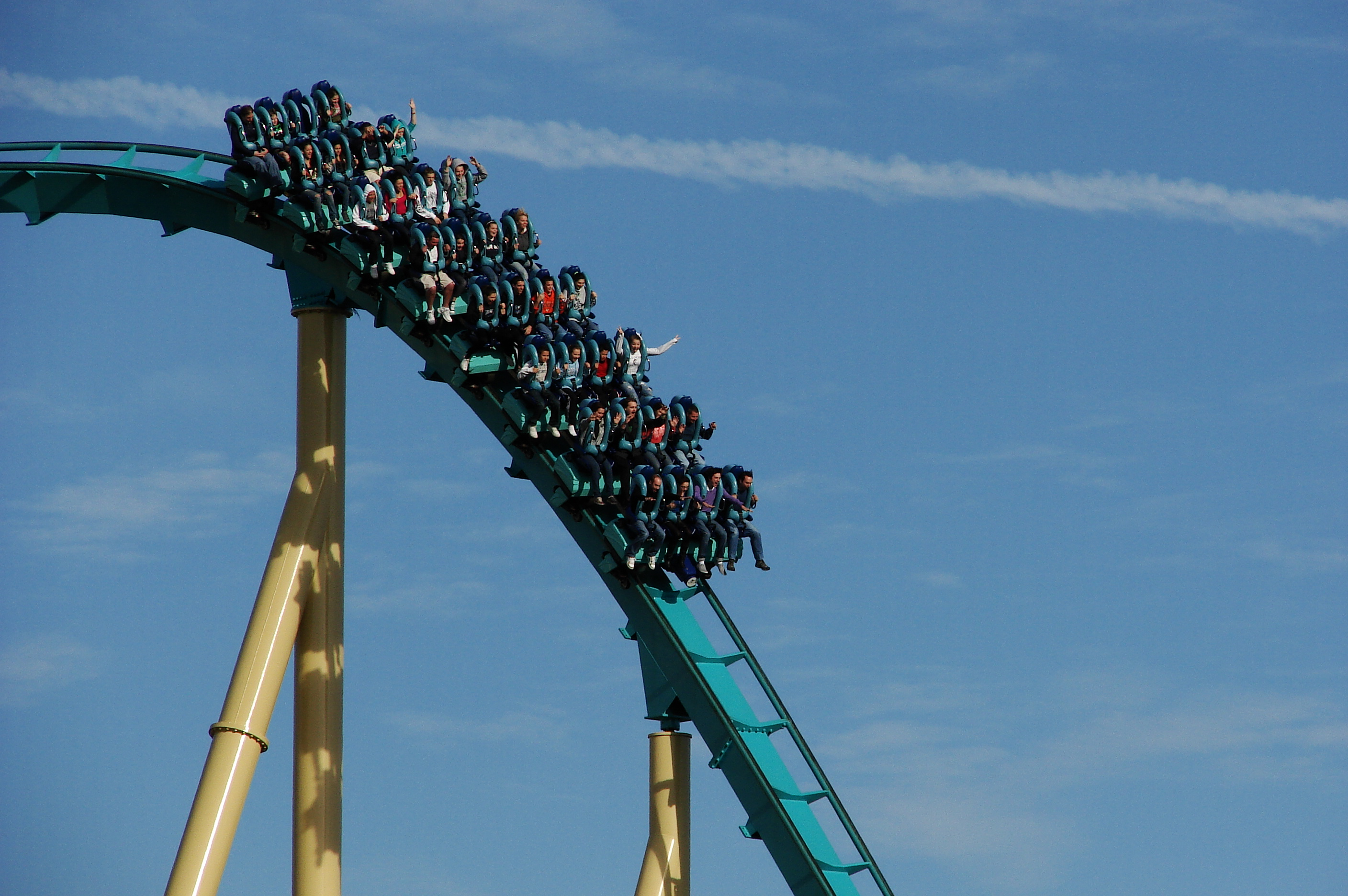
One of Kraken's trains descending the first drop in 2009

Kraken operates with three floorless trains. Each train seats 32 riders in eight rows of four. This gives the ride a theoretical hourly capacity of 1,500 riders per hour. The open-air trains feature seats which leave riders' legs dangling above the track. Riders are restrained with over-the-shoulder restraints. As the trains are floorless, the station has a retractable floor.

=== Theme ===
Kraken is themed to the mythological sea monster of the same name, kept caged by Poseidon. Much of the ride is located above water, with three sections featuring subterranean dives. The ride's station and surrounding area are themed to Kraken's lair. Eels are said to be Kraken's young and therefore feature throughout the ride's queue. A SeaWorld Orlando spokesman stated "although it's a roller coaster, the theme of the ride brings it back to the sea, and to [SeaWorld Orlando's] core".

== Ride experience ==
After riders have boarded, the station floor is retracted and the front gates of the station open. Kraken departs with a right U-turn out of the station. This leads directly to the 153-foot-tall (47 m) chain lift hill. At the top, the train descends a small pre-drop and follows a level turn to the right before dropping 144 feet (44 m) towards the ground. The ride then enters the first 128-foot-tall (39m) vertical loop, followed by a dive loop. The train traverses a zero-g roll, which is followed by a cobra roll. A banked turn to the left leads into the mid-course brake run. The exit from the mid-course brake run drops down directly into the second vertical loop. A subterranean dive into a tunnel themed to Kraken's lair is followed by a corkscrew and a flat spin. The ride concludes by entering the final brake run and returning to the station.

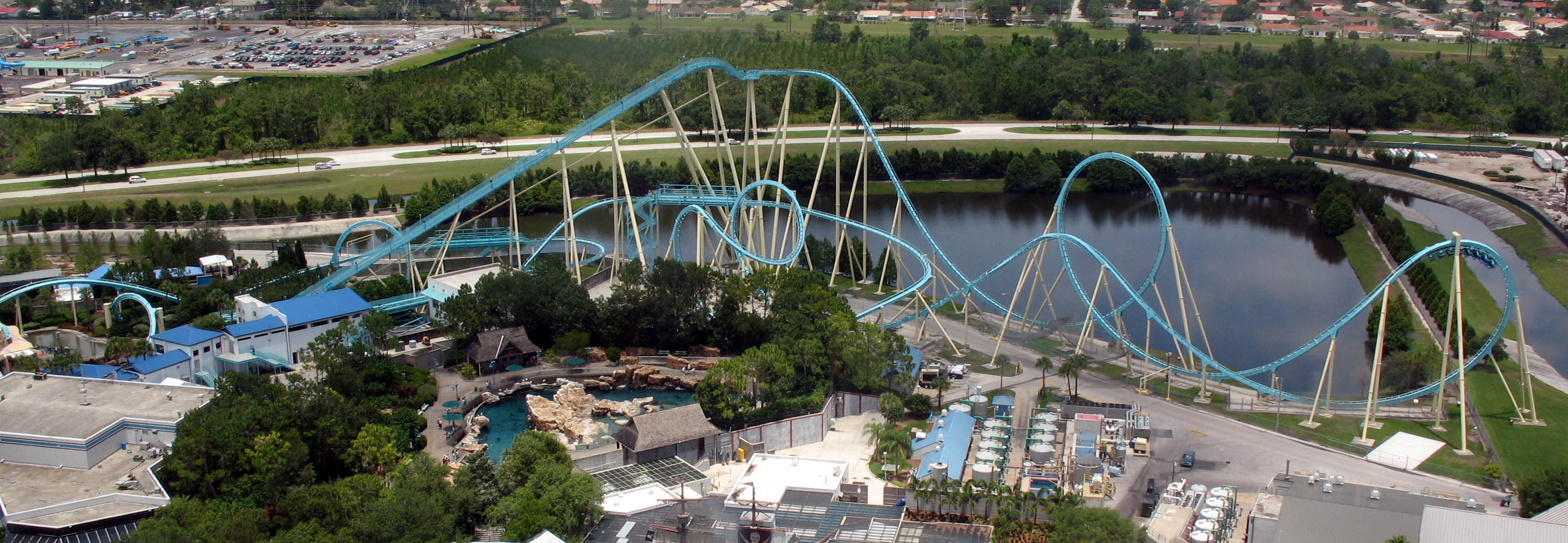
An overview of Kraken in 2007, showing the ride as it looked prior to Mako's construction on the opposite side of the lake

== Reception ==
The Orlando Sentinel commended the ride for "perfect timing and keeping folks guessing", giving the ride ratings of 4 out of 5 for both thrill and theming. Sentinel reporter Dewayne Bevil ranked the ride at number 7 in his Top 50 Orlando Theme Park Attractions list. In an interview for the Los Angeles Times, Jerry Dane of the Florida Coaster Club described the floorless experience as "you are hung out there open and free". Dane also commended the ride's ability to provide different, yet equally good experiences in a variety of seats. In 2012, Kraken was featured on the Travel Channel TV series Insane Coaster Wars, and received first place in the public-voted "Wrong Way Up" category. Theme Park Review's Robb Alvey shared the view that Kraken was better than several other rides built by Bolliger & Mabillard.

In Amusement Today's annual Golden Ticket Awards, Kraken was ranked in the top 50 steel roller coasters a few times. It debuted on the poll at position 48 in 2003, peaked at position 23 in 2004, before it fell off the poll in 2009. It briefly returned at the position of 48 in 2013, but has not ranked in the top 50 since.

Golden Ticket Awards: Top steel Roller Coasters
Year									1998	1999
Ranking									–	–
Year	2000	2001	2002	2003	2004	2005	2006	2007	2008	2009
Ranking	–	–	–	48	23	26	45	40	42	–
Year	2010	2011	2012	2013	2014	2015	2016	2017	2018	2019
Ranking	–	–	–	48 (tied)	–	–	–	–	–	–
Year	2020	2021	2022	2023	2024	2025	2026			
Ranking	N/A	–	–	–	–	–	–			
