= Ice Breaker (roller coaster) =

Roller coaster at SeaWorld Orlando

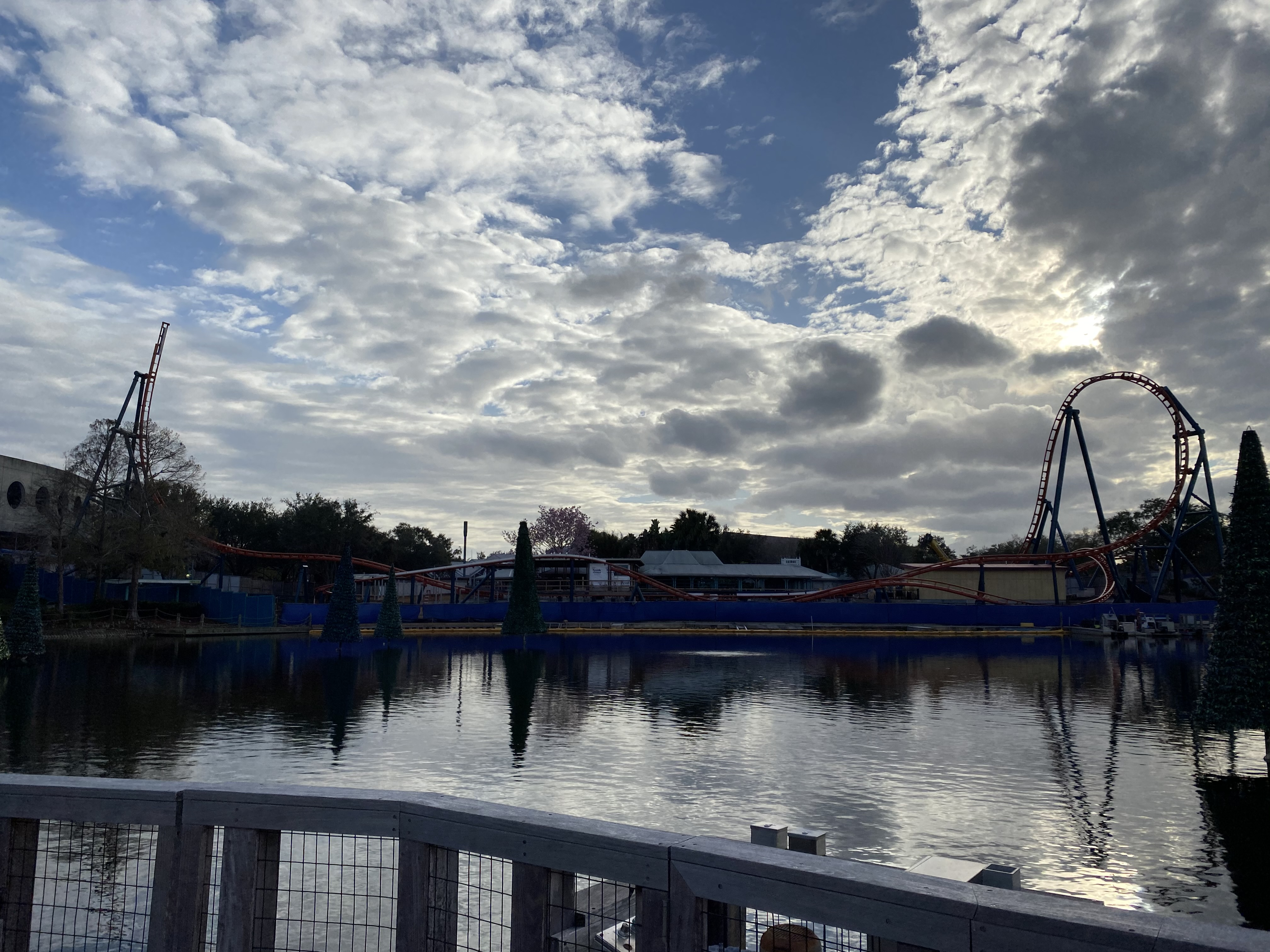
- Ice Breaker during construction in January 2020

SeaWorld Orlando
- Location: SeaWorld Orlando
- Park section: Sea of Power
- Coordinates: 28.4088°N 81.4633°W
- Status: Operating
- Opening date: February 18, 2022

General statistics
- Type: Steel – Launched
- Manufacturer: Premier Rides
- Model: Sky Rocket
- Lift/launch system: LSM
- Height: 93 ft (28 m)
- Length: 1,900 ft (580 m)
- Speed: 52 mph (84 km/h)
- Inversions: 0
- Duration: 1:20
- Max vertical angle: 100°
- Height restriction: 48 in (122 cm)
- Trains: 2 trains with 3 cars. Riders are arranged 2 across in 3 rows for a total of 18 riders per train.
- Website: Official website
- Quick Queue available
- Ice Breaker at RCDB

Ice Breaker is a launched steel roller coaster at SeaWorld Orlando in Orlando, Florida, United States. Manufactured by Premier Rides, Ice Breaker reaches a maximum height of 93 feet (28 m), maximum speeds of 52 mph (84 km/h), and a total track length of 1,900 feet (580 m). The ride was originally scheduled to open for the 2020 season, but its opening was delayed to 2022 due to the COVID-19 pandemic. The ride features the steepest drop on any roller coaster in Florida.

== History ==
In September 2019, SeaWorld Orlando revealed the name for their next new roller coaster, Ice Breaker. In November 2019, the ride's trains were revealed at the International Association of Amusement Parks and Attractions (IAAPA) Exposition. In February 2020, construction of the ride was completed. The ride was unable to open during 2020 or 2021 due to the COVID-19 pandemic.

In January 2022, it was announced that Ice Breaker would open on February 18, 2022. The height requirement was adjusted from 48 inches to 54 inches a day after opening. Following the removal of the ride's "comfort collar" restraint systems during a maintenance period, the ride reopened on March 11, 2023 with its height requirement lowered back down to 48 inches.

== Ride experience ==
After leaving the station, the ride enters a switch track, where the section of track the train sits on moves to the right while the train is on it. Next is a multi-pass launch, where the train is launched back and forth multiple times, building up speed. The train is first launched backwards at a slow speed over a small hill and towards a vertical spike. Next, the train is launched forwards over the small hill, going partially up a top hat. The train is then launched backwards once more, back over the small hill and up the 93-foot (28 m), 100° beyond-vertical spike. The train is then launched for the final time, traveling forwards over the top hat. After cresting the top hat, the train turns to the right before traversing two airtime hills. Next, the train turns up and to the right, then drops down and twists to the left. After this, the train traverses two banked turns and an airtime hill before entering the final brake run and turning into the station.
