= Penguin Trek =

Roller coaster at SeaWorld Orlando

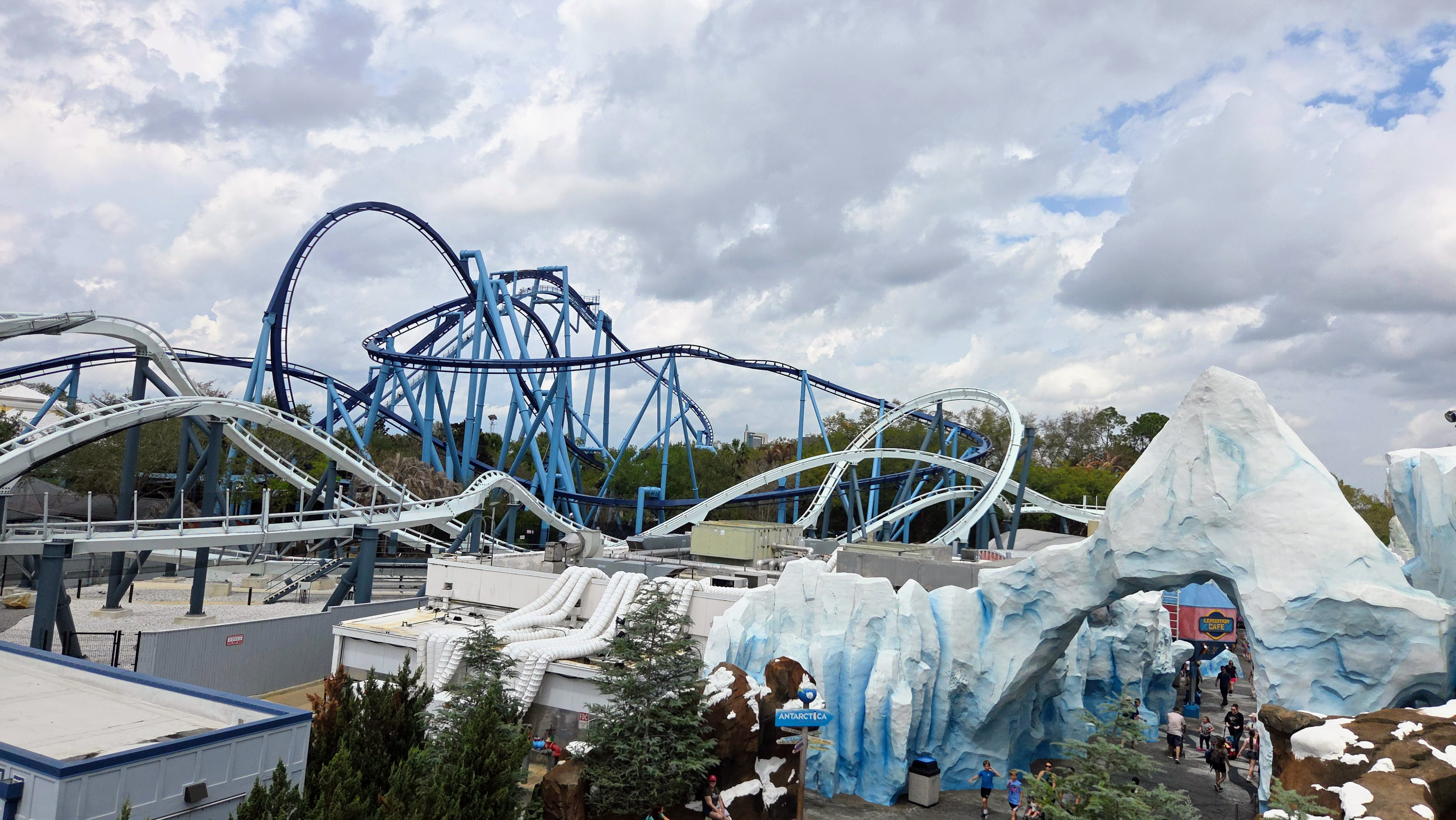
- Penguin Trek is the white coaster in the foreground

SeaWorld Orlando
- Location: SeaWorld Orlando
- Park section: Sea of Ice
- Coordinates: 28.411926°N 81.459923°W
- Status: Operating
- Soft opening date: July 2, 2024; 2 years ago
- Opening date: July 7, 2024; 2 years ago
- Replaced: Antarctica: Empire of the Penguin

General statistics
- Type: Steel – Family – Launched
- Manufacturer: Bolliger & Mabillard
- Lift/launch system: LSM launch
- Height: 65 ft (20 m)
- Length: 3,020 ft (920 m)
- Speed: 43 mph (69 km/h)
- Inversions: 0
- Height restriction: 42 in (107 cm)
- Trains: 3 trains with 9 cars. Riders are arranged 2 across in a single row for a total of 18 riders per train.
- Website: Official website
- Quick Queue Available
- Must transfer from wheelchair
- Penguin Trek at RCDB

Penguin Trek is a steel launched roller coaster located at SeaWorld Orlando in Orlando, Florida. The ride was manufactured by Bolliger & Mabillard, and opened to the public on July 2, 2024. It features both indoor and outdoor sections, providing an experience simulating an Antarctic snowmobile expedition. It is located in the Sea of Ice section of the park.

== History ==
Antarctica: Empire of the Penguin was a motion-based dark ride that operated at SeaWorld Orlando from May 2013 to March 2020, billed at the time of opening as the largest attraction of its kind at any United Parks & Resorts theme park. The ride was the first trackless dark ride, and featured several penguin exhibits within the area. The ride was temporarily closed alongside the rest of the park for several months in 2020 due to the COVID-19 pandemic, but failed to reopen with the rest of the park's attractions when pandemic-related restrictions eased. The adjacent penguin exhibits, however, did reopen.

Construction walls and survey markers first went up around the former Antarctica: Empire of the Penguin building in December 2022. SeaWorld Orlando filed further permits in February 2023, calling for building modifications as part of what was then known as Project Toboggan. Work on the attraction’s foundations commenced outdoors in July 2023, with the first pieces of coaster track arriving later that month from Clermont Steel Fabricators in Batavia, Ohio. The final track piece was officially lifted into place on January 30, 2024. Work then shifted towards construction of the sets indoors, including the queue, station, and indoor portion of the coaster.

SeaWorld Orlando officially announced Penguin Trek on September 28, 2023, later revealing one of its lead cars on display at the International Association of Amusement Parks and Attractions (IAAPA) Expo on November 14, 2023. The ride began testing for the first time at the end of April 2024, and the surrounding Antarctica-themed area was opened to the public on May 25. Penguin Trek officially held its grand opening on July 7, 2024, featuring Puck the Penguin – the mascot of the former Antarctica: Empire of the Penguin attraction – and a contingent of children from Scouts of America in attendance.

== Ride experience ==
The ride begins in an indoor Antarctic-themed section with glaciers, snow, and an LED screen display of penguins before launching into the outdoors, utilizing a linear synchronous motor (LSM) launch in a wide right turn. A series of twists and turns including a banked turn lead to another LSM launch. This second launch leads to a overbanked turn. The ride takes a left turn over an airtime hill and then a wide left turn before reaching its final brake run and returning to the station. Riders have compared the ride experience to that of sledding and bobsledding due to the ride’s use of airtime hills and turns.
