= Mako (roller coaster) =

Roller coaster at SeaWorld Orlando

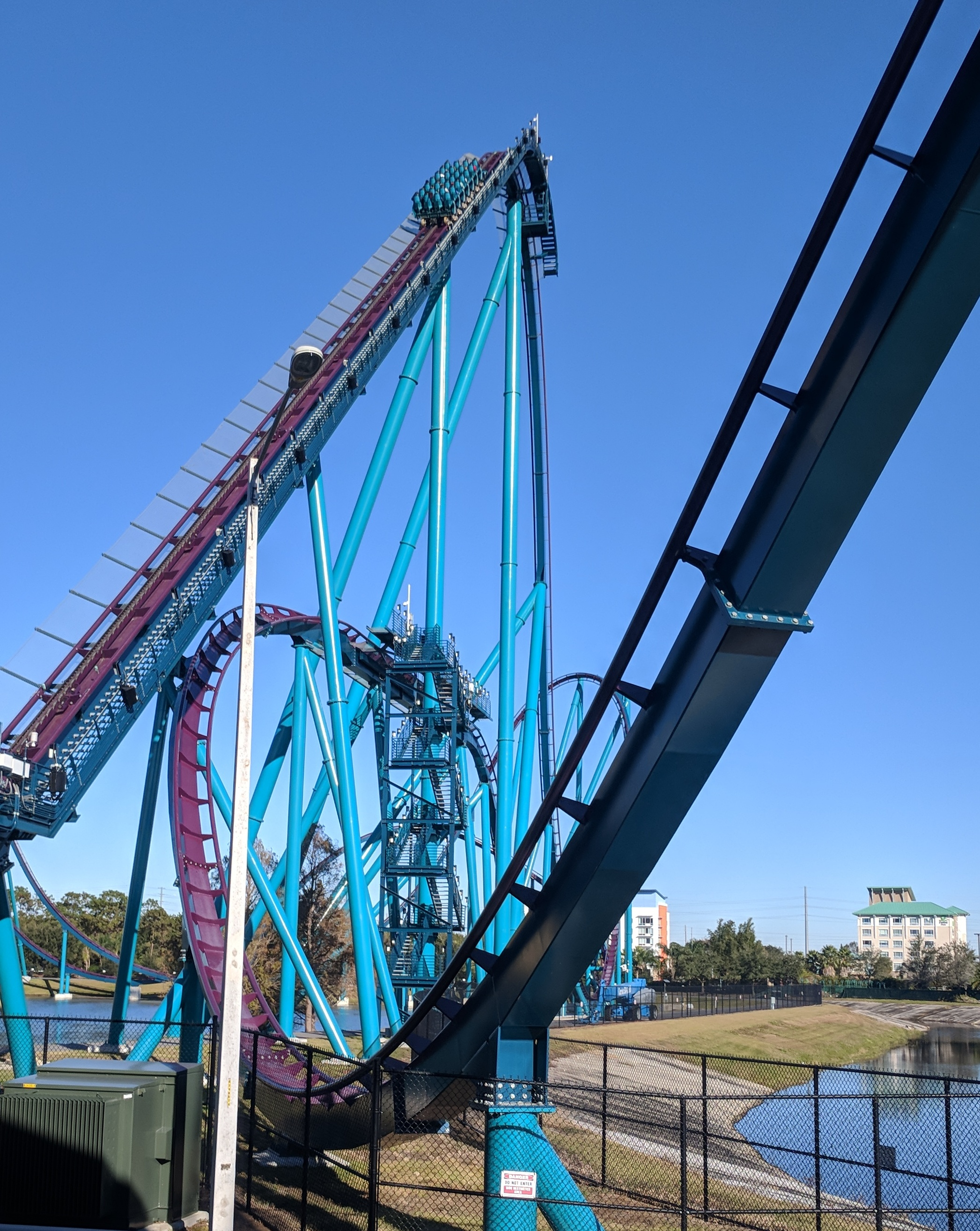
- Lift hill of Mako

SeaWorld Orlando
- Location: SeaWorld Orlando
- Park section: Sea of Mystery
- Coordinates: 28.40955°N 81.45915°W
- Status: Operating
- Soft opening date: June 2, 2016
- Opening date: June 10, 2016

General statistics
- Type: Steel
- Manufacturer: Bolliger & Mabillard
- Model: Hyper Coaster
- Track layout: Out-and-back
- Lift/launch system: Chain lift hill
- Height: 200 ft (61 m)
- Drop: 200 ft (61 m)
- Length: 4,760 ft (1,450 m)
- Speed: 73 mph (117 km/h)
- Inversions: 0
- Height restriction: 54 in (137 cm)
- Trains: 3 trains with 7 cars; riders arranged 4 across in a single row for a total of 28 riders per train
- Music: Rick McKee
- Quick Queue available
- Mako at RCDB

Video

Mako is a steel roller coaster located at SeaWorld Orlando in Orlando, Florida. Manufactured by Bolliger & Mabillard (B&M), the hypercoaster opened to the public on June 10, 2016. Mako is named after the mako shark and is located in the Sea of Mystery section of the park. It reaches a height of 200 feet (61 m), maximum speeds of 73 mph (117 km/h), and features a track length of 4,760 feet (1,450 m).

The roller coaster was marketed as the tallest, fastest, and longest roller coaster in Orlando, and has been well-received, ranking every year since its opening in the top 50 of the annual Golden Ticket Awards publication from Amusement Today. It attained its highest ranking of 15 in 2019. The ride is one of eight roller coasters at SeaWorld Orlando, and was the first to be added since Manta opened in 2009.

== History ==
In April 2015, SeaWorld Orlando officials began teasing an upcoming announcement for a new thrill ride at the park. At the time, the only detail publicly known was that the roller coaster would be 200 feet in height and would become the longest, tallest, and fastest roller coaster in Orlando. On May 13, 2015, SeaWorld filed a trademark for the names "Mako" and "Reef Hunter". On May 27, 2015, SeaWorld officially announced the addition of Mako, themed to the mako shark, the fastest species of shark in the ocean. Alongside the announcement, a simulated point-of-view was released depicting the ride's intended layout along the park's lagoon.

On August 17, 2015, the first pieces of track began to ship from B&M's steel fabrication plant in Ohio, and started to arrive on site in Orlando two days later. On January 6, 2016, the roller coaster's lift hill was topped off. The first car of the train arrived on site and was revealed on February 16, 2016, with the lead car resembling the face of a mako shark. On March 15, 2016, the last piece of track was put into place.

In April 2016, SeaWorld began showing a presentation called "Mako Rising" previewing the upcoming roller coaster in their Nautilis Theater. When testing began, the park released an on-ride point-of-view video. Mako's soft opening was on June 2, 2016, with the official media day to introduce the roller coaster being hosted on June 9, 2016. Its official opening to the public was on June 10, 2016. In addition to the ride's opening, a seasonal event named "Summer of Mako" was hosted from June to August 2016 throughout the park and its sister water park Aquatica Orlando.

== Ride experience ==
=== Entrance and queue area ===
The roller coaster is themed to the mako shark. Similarly the 2-acre (0.81 ha) park area around it, entitled "Shark Wreck Reef", is themed to sharks. The area features recycled art, a mural created by Guy Harvey, and educational pieces about human and shark interactions.

As guests traverse the queue area, various educational displays and an additional Guy Harvey exhibit can be seen. The queue of the ride consists of a wooden pier, where the riders are situated under while waiting. The theme of Mako's station is a shipwreck. Different sections of an original musical score are played throughout the queue and loading station, as well as the plaza area beneath the coaster. SeaWorld Orlando commissioned the 32-minute score, which was composed and produced by Rick McKee. Before the ride's train dispatches, a panel located above riders shows scenes of shadowy figures of a group of sharks migrating forward with accommodating visuals and sound.

=== Layout ===
After leaving the station, the train makes a small right turn to a 200-foot (61 m) lift hill to begin its ascent. After reaching the top, it enters a 200-foot (61 m) drop, in which the train reaches a top speed of 73 miles per hour (117 km/h). The train traverses a tall, overbanked turn, hugging the side of the lake, before coasting over an airtime hill. After the hill, the track turns around in a hammerhead turn. Traveling over another camelback hill, the train goes over a series of airtime hills as the track travels back along the lake before entering the mid-course brake run. Dropping out of the mid-course brake run, the track makes a small left turn under the lift hill and goes into another airtime hill. It makes a banked turn to the right and goes into another banked turn to the left over a part of the park's lagoon before entering the final brake run and returning to the station.

== Characteristics ==
=== Track ===
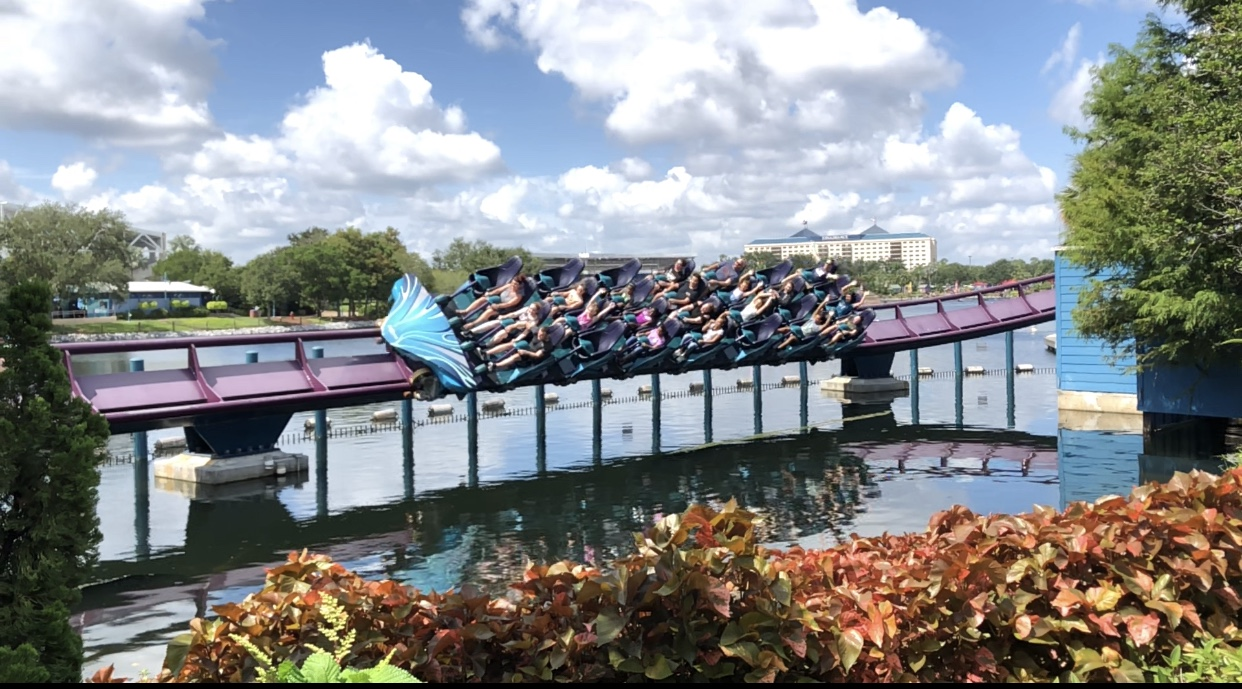
Mako's train as it traverses through the final turn over the lagoon

Mako is 4,760 feet (1,450 m) long and the lift is approximately 200 feet (61 m) high. The steel box track pieces were shipped on flatbed trucks from Clermont Steel Fabricators in Batavia, Ohio to Orlando, Florida, where they were assembled. The track of the roller coaster is purple with blue supports. The roller coaster has nine airtime moments, and a third of the layout is over water.

=== Trains ===
Mako operates with three lead and fiberglass trains, each containing seven cars. The ride features individual lap bar restraints and each car seats four riders in a single row for a total of 28 riders per train. The trains were designed with the physiology of a mako shark in mind, featuring a face on the front and gills on both sides. They run on polyurethane wheels which help to reduce friction on the track.

== Reception ==
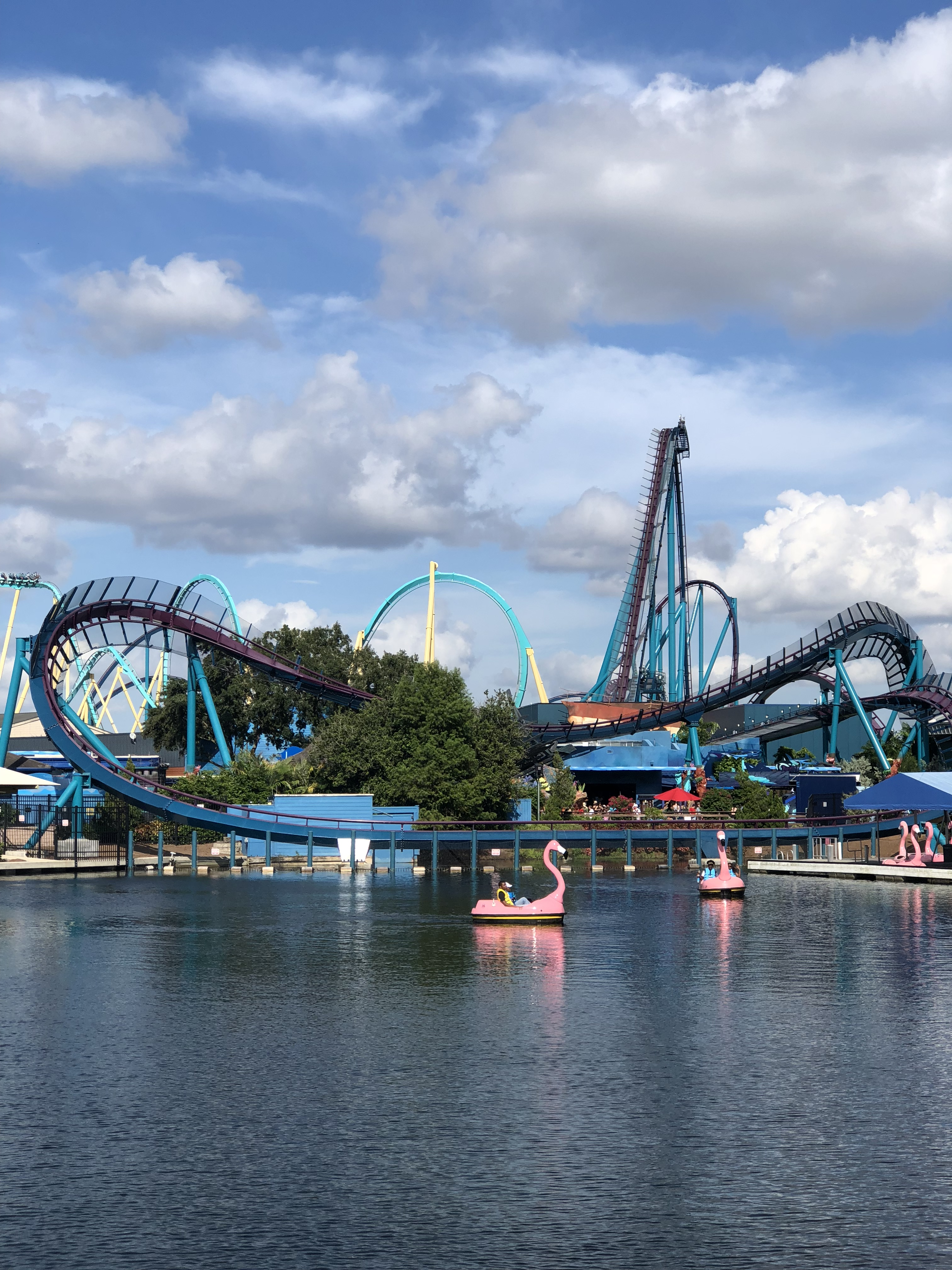
View of Mako from across park's lake showing the lift hill and finale

Mako has been positively received among guests and critics. Dewayne Bevil of the Orlando Sentinel described the ride as "breathtaking" and stated "SeaWorld has delivered on its marketing promise with the fastest, tallest, longest coaster in the Orlando market". Marjie Lambert from the Miami Herald commented that the ride was like a "retro coaster" and mentioned "its design is reminiscent of old wooden coasters where the track couldn’t be shaped into the pretzels and upside down loops that are so popular in today’s steel coasters". Sharon Wynne from the Tampa Bay Times suggested "it will likely to take two or three more trips on this coaster to appreciate all its tricks", and coaster enthusiast Jim Terry acclaimed it as the best roller coaster in Florida.

Arthur Levine of USA Today remarked that "it's more than enough to get pulses racing and senses heightened, but not so much as to cause tunnel vision, grayouts, or other unpleasant side effects". Elle Gordon of the Irish Independent likened the "weightless airtime" as a highlight of her park visit and added it was well worth a night time ride. Russell Meyer of Theme Park Insider observed the theming of the roller coaster and its surrounding area was "excellently done", noting the accommodating effects and music to be a "nice touch".

=== Awards ===
Golden Ticket Awards: Best New Ride for 2016
Ranking	3

Golden Ticket Awards: Top steel Roller Coasters
Year									1998	1999
Ranking									–	–
Year	2000	2001	2002	2003	2004	2005	2006	2007	2008	2009
Ranking	–	–	–	–	–	–	–	–	–	–
Year	2010	2011	2012	2013	2014	2015	2016	2017	2018	2019
Ranking	–	–	–	–	–	–	35	31	17	15
Year	2020	2021	2022	2023	2024	2025	2026			
Ranking	N/A	17	16	17	19	22	28			

== See also ==
- 2016 in amusement parks
