= Aquatica (water parks) =

Chain of water parks

- Industry: Water parks
- Founded: Orlando, Florida (March 1, 2008; 18 years ago)
- Number of locations: 2
- Area served: United States
- Owner: United Parks & Resorts
- Website: Aquatica Orlando; Aquatica San Antonio

Aquatica is a chain of water parks owned and operated by United Parks & Resorts. Aquatica parks serve as companions to United's SeaWorld parks, containing a mixture of animal habitats and water-based attractions.

The chain consists of two parks in Orlando, Florida and San Antonio, Texas, which are sister parks to SeaWorld Orlando and SeaWorld San Antonio, respectively. A third park in Chula Vista, California, which was a sister to SeaWorld San Diego, was closed in 2021 and converted into Sesame Place San Diego.

== History ==
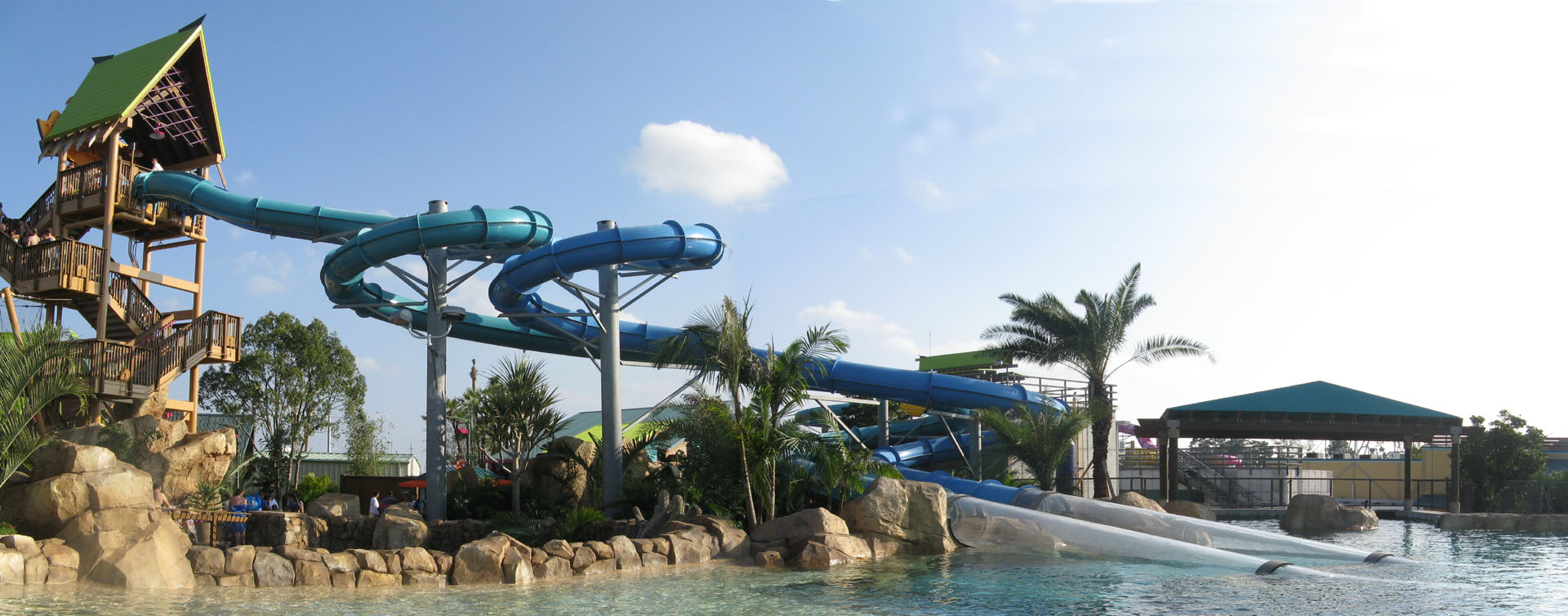
Aquatica Orlando's Dolphin Plunge (now Reef Plunge) water slides

SeaWorld Orlando originally announced plans to build a water park on July 15, 2005. The announcement stated that it would be a "natural" park and revealed the park's iconic Dolphin Plunge (now Reef Plunge) water slides. On March 5, 2007, SeaWorld held a press conference officially announcing Aquatica. It was expected the 59-acre (24 ha) park would cost US$50 million to build. Construction continued in earnest throughout 2007 and into early 2008. Previews for employees and holders of park annual passes were held in February. On March 1, 2008, the park opened to guests for the first time, with the official grand opening held on April 4, 2008. In its debut year, the park hosted approximately 950,000 guests, making it the fourth-most visited water park in the United States and eighth-most visited in the world. The park was an immediate success, reaching its opening-year attendance goal in just six months.

In early 2011, rumors speculated about Aquatica coming to SeaWorld San Antonio in the future. According to the park president, SeaWorld San Antonio would become a multi-day experience. SeaWorld officially announced plans to build a water park on May 24, 2011. The announcement called it, "a whimsical waterpark with up-close animal experiences, high-speed thrills and relaxing, sandy beaches". The water park replaced Lost Lagoon that opened in the early 1990s. Lost Lagoon closed on Labor Day weekend 2011. During October 2011 the construction of the new water park started with excavation for the new entrance, the new sandy beaches and the structure for the new Wahalla Wave water slide. In early November 2011 the new water slides arrived in pieces at Sea World San Antonio's parking lot, waiting to get assembled. Aquatica San Antonio officially opened on May 19, 2012.

On November 20, 2012, Cedar Fair announced it had sold its San Diego Soak City park to SeaWorld Parks & Entertainment. The water park originally opened on May 31, 1997, under the name White Water Canyon. At the time it featured 16 water slides and a wave pool. In December 1999, Cedar Fair purchased the park for $11.5 million and renamed it Knott's Soak City U.S.A. The water park had opened with a new beach theme in May 2000. The acquisition by SeaWorld Parks & Entertainment saw the park transformed into a 32-acre (13 ha) water park named Aquatica San Diego. The refurbished park reopened on June 1, 2013.

In mid-March 2020, all Aquatica parks were shut down caused by the COVID-19 pandemic. By June 2021 all of the parks had fully reopened to visitors.

On September 12, 2021, Aquatica San Diego closed for its final season. The park was rethemed and transformed into Sesame Place San Diego during Fall and Winter 2021. The park opened with the new theme in March 2022.

== Aquatica Orlando ==
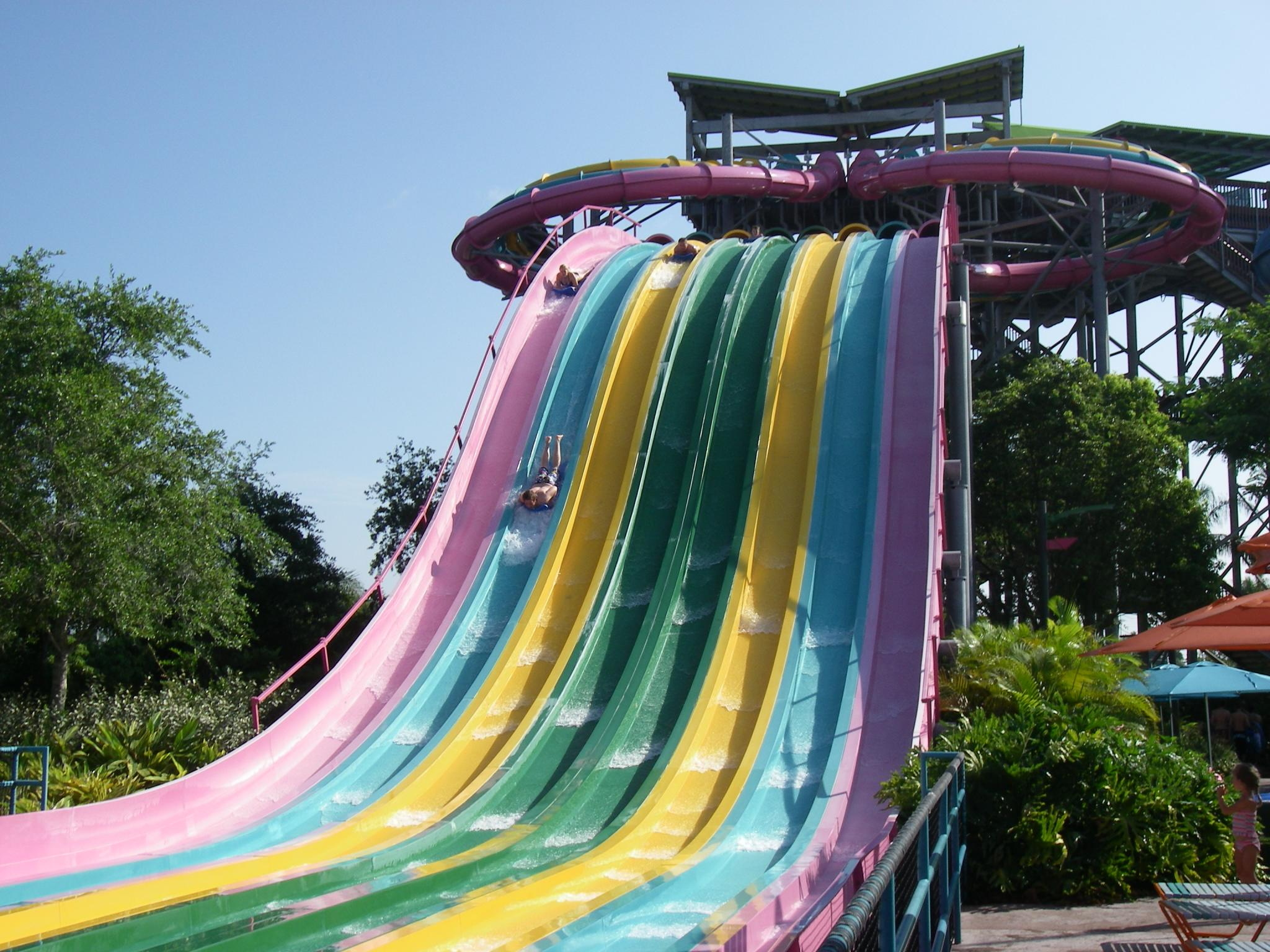
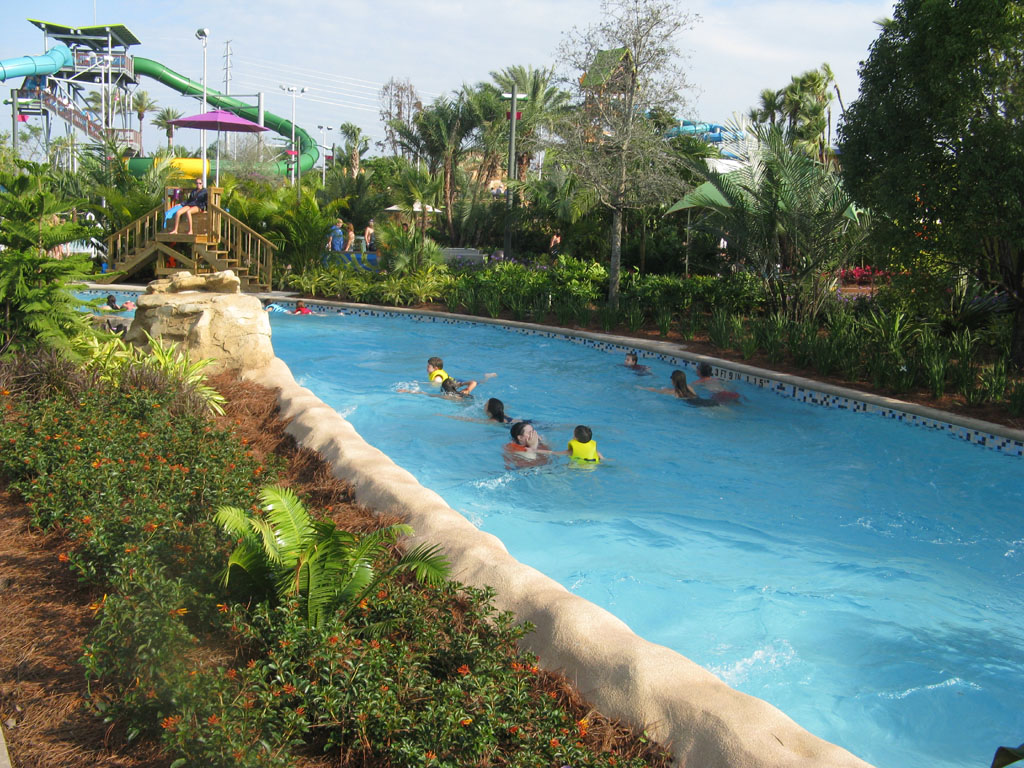
Aquatica Orlando's Taumata Racer (left) and Roa's Rapids (right)

Aquatica Orlando is located in Orlando, Florida. It is a sister park of SeaWorld Orlando and Discovery Cove. The park opened on March 1, 2008, and is themed to the southern Pacific, and features Australian and New Zealand based animal mascots including Roa (a kiwi), Kata (a kookaburra), Wai (a Commerson's dolphin), Ihu (a gecko), Papa (a royal spoonbill), Wae Wae (a takahe), and Motu (a turtle). The park features a wide array of attractions for all ages and swimming abilities, some of which pass by or through animal habitats. The park has two wave pools which share an extensive, 80,000-square-foot (7,400 m^{2}) man made white-sand beach area equipped with deck chairs, sun beds and umbrellas.

Body/matt slides

- Reef Plunge – formerly known as Dolphin Plunge, these two enclosed WhiteWater body slides pass through a pool containing a pod of Commerson's dolphins. The dolphins in this attraction were originally from SeaWorld San Diego. Their names are Pepe, Ross, Ringer and Juan. Ringer was announced pregnant in early May and gave birth on May 20, 2017 but the calf died a few minutes after birth. In 2022, the attraction was transformed into Reef Plunge, retrofitting the slide with translucent shape effects and runout lanes as well as adding more types of sea animals into the existing tank.
- Ihu's Breakaway Falls - consists of three drop slides and one speed slide. Each one goes through many helixes. The slides are approximately 80 feet tall and drop riders at an 80-degree angle. All four slides were manufactured by ProSlide and opened in 2014.
- Taumata Racer – an eight-lane, WhiteWater West "Whizzard" racing slide with guests sliding down on mats through enclosed and open sections. Opened along with the park in 2008.

Tube slides

- Whanau Way – A tower with four WhiteWater West double-raft slides. (1 or 2 riders)
- Tassie's Underwater Twist – A pair of WhiteWater West Super Bowls. The slides are a funnel-like and can be ridden in single or double rafts. This ride can only be accessed through Loggerhead Lane. Opened along with the park as Tassie Twisters in 2008 before being transformed to its current state in 2024.
- Riptide Race – A 68-foot (21 m) tall dueling tube slide where riders race against each other in one of two 650-foot (200 m) slides. It is a part of the Proslide Technology Dueling Pipeline variant, and was originally slated to open for the 2020 season, becoming delayed due to the COVID-19 pandemic. It is located near Banana Beach Cookout. Opened in 2021.
- Omaka Rocka – Tubes each carrying one rider descend into one of two slides with segments that look like a tornado funnel laying on its side. Opened in late 2011.

Multi-person family raft slides (round rafts)

- Walhalla Wave (2017) - A raft slide with enclosed, pitch-dark segments. (2 - 4 riders) (2 riders required)
- Ray Rush – A colorful WhiteWater West raft slide featuring a flat master blaster section, a spherical Aquasphere oscillation chamber, and a signature Manta halfpipe element. Opened in spring 2018.
- KareKare Curl (2019) - A Proslide Technology TornadoWAVE 60 wall slide, which propels riders up a curved wall. (2 riders required). Opened in summer 2019.

Lazy rivers

- Roa's Rapids – a faster, aggressive version of the lazy river with geysers, speed zones and center islands.
- Loggerhead Lane – a traditional lazy river that passes through a grotto of cichlids and the Commerson's dolphin exhibit.

Wave pools

- Cutback Cove – the deeper of the two wave pools (6 1/2 feet deep), Cutback Cove is a narrower pool than Big Surf Shores and can sometimes carry slightly larger waves as a result.
- Big Surf Shores – a somewhat wider pool than Cutback, Big Surf is oftentimes closed in the slower seasons, or halfway open depending on the number of guests in the park.

Children's areas

- Turi's Kid Cove – a water adventure attraction filled with watering palms, tipping buckets, spraying jets, water bobbles, and more. The original attraction, Kata’s Kookaburra Cove, opened with the park in 2008. In late 2022 the area underwent a serious renovation and opened as Turi’s Kid Cove in spring 2023.
- Walkabout Waters – a WhiteWater West Giant Rainfortress with slides, ladders and dumping water buckets. Opened with the park in 2008.

Former Attractions

- HooRoo Run - A WhiteWater West family multi-person raft slide consisting of a triple-humped drop. This slide closed in 2017 and was replaced by Ray Rush which opened in 2018.
- Kata's Kookaburra Cove – designed for younger children, with smaller slides and play features. This area closed in 2022 and was replaced by Turi's Kid Cove which opened in 2023 and features the Tamariki Twirl water slide.

== Aquatica San Antonio ==
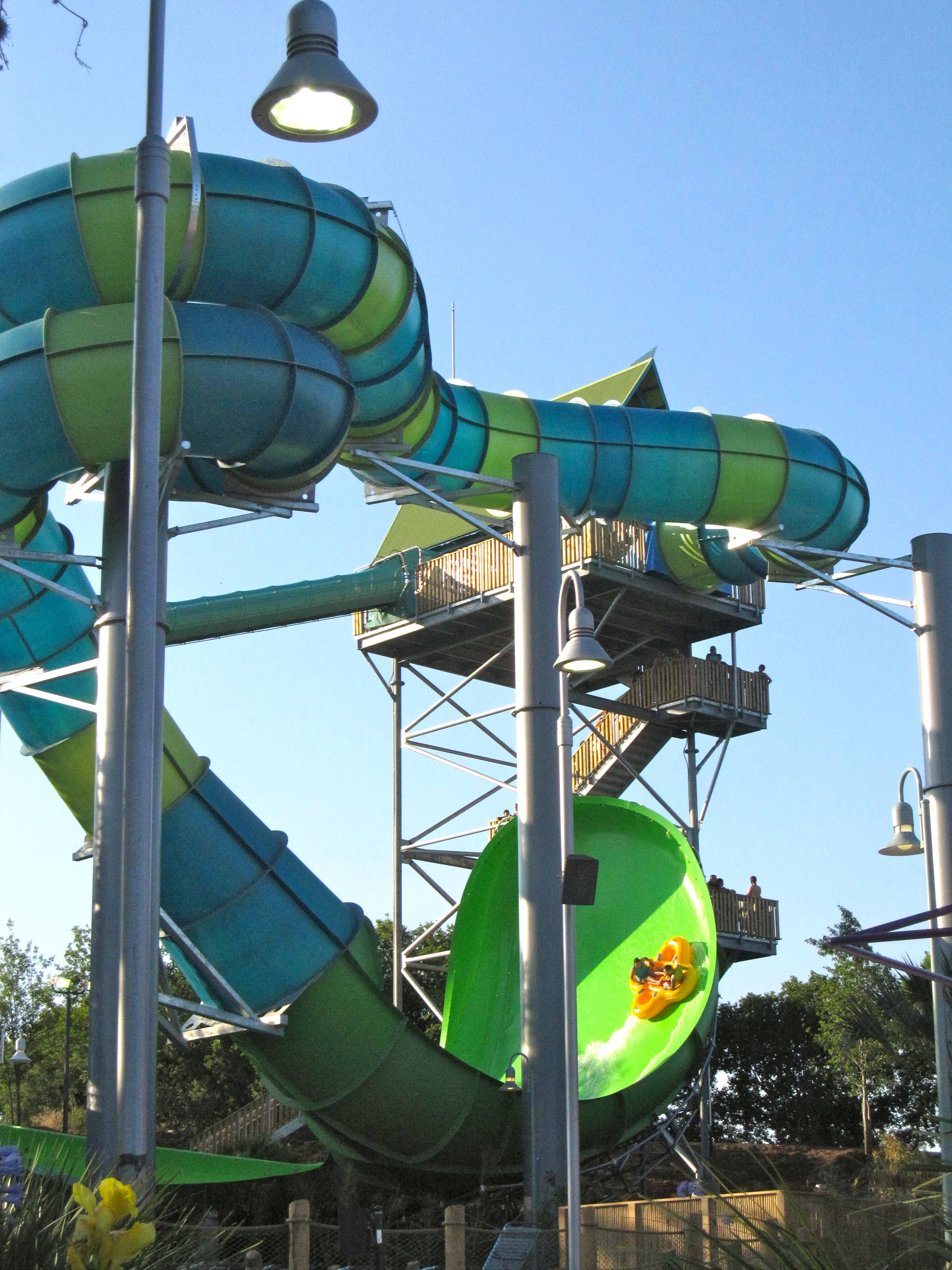
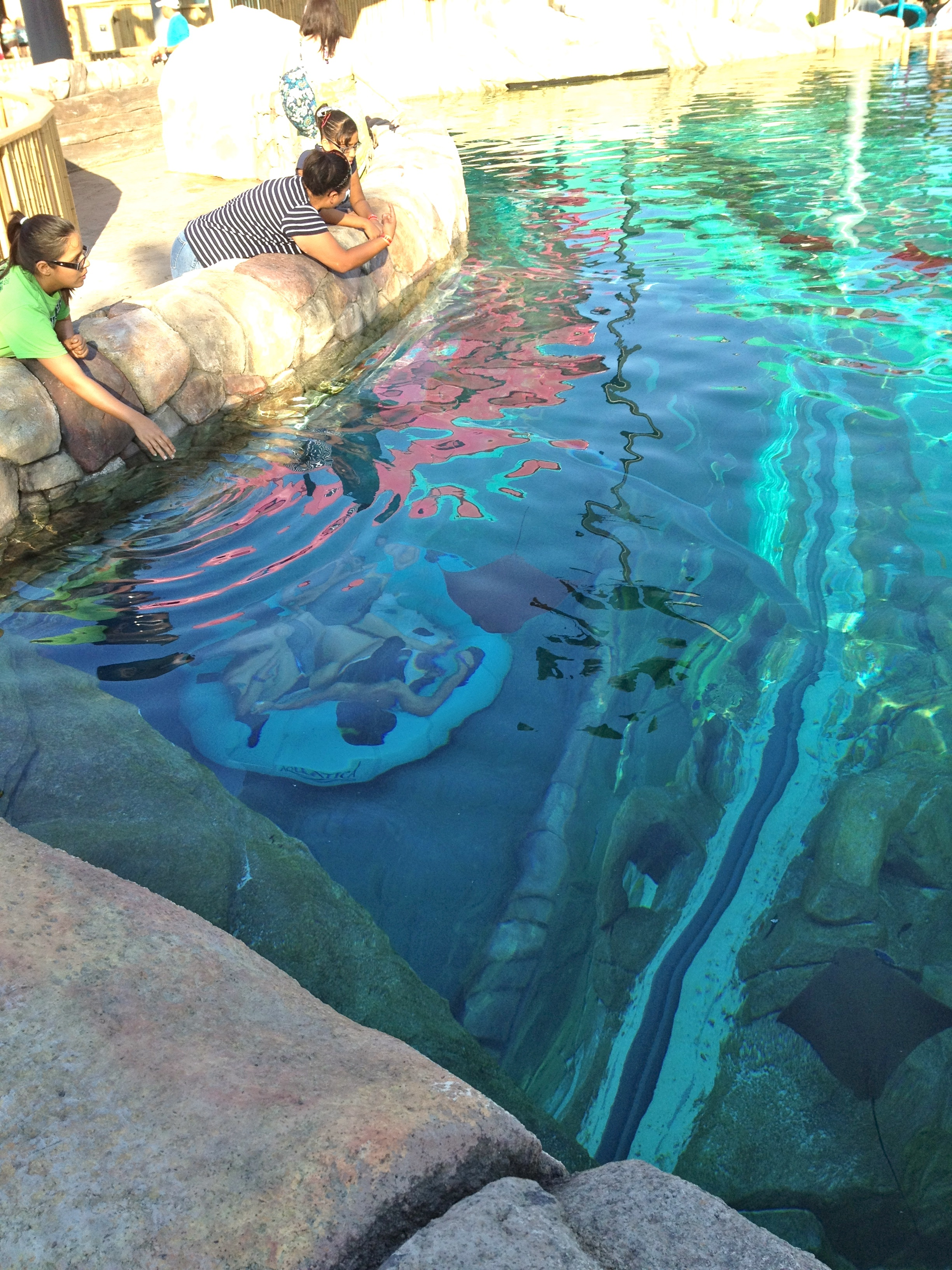
Aquatica San Antonio's ProSlide Tornado Wave (left) and Stingray Falls (right)

Aquatica San Antonio is located in San Antonio, Texas. The water park opened on May 19, 2012, and is a companion to SeaWorld San Antonio. It features a wide array of attractions for all ages and swimming abilities, one of which of passes under an animal habitat.

Current Attractions

- Stingray Falls – First kind in the world – A family raft ride that takes riders through twist and turns, and then goes through an underwater grotto with stingrays and tropical fish. It is a ProSlide "MAMMOTH" slide
- Walhalla Wave – A Proslide Technology TornadoWAVE
- HooRoo Run – Named for the Australian "goodbye" greeting.
- Taumata Racer
- Kiwi Curl
- Tonga Twister – New for 2020 WhiteWater West body slides.
- Cutback Cove Slides
- Walkabout Waters - a WhiteWater West Giant Rainfortress.
- Ke-Re Reef
- Zippity Zappity
- Whanau Way
- Loggerhead Lane
- Big Surf Shores
- Ihu's Breakaway Falls – New for 2019, using Proslide Technology drop pod slides, advertised as the tallest in the state of Texas.
- Riptide Race - New for 2022, advertised as the world’s tallest “dueling racer” slide. It is a part of the Proslide Technology Dueling Pipeline variant.

Former Attractions

- Roa’s Aviary - An aviary opened in 2014 which was located in the middle of Loggerhead Lane (similar to Tassie's Twister in Orlando). The aviary had a waterfall entrance to prevent birds from getting out. The 34,000 square foot facility featured multiple species of birds. The birds were removed from the facility after the 2018 season and it was converted into a private cabana area.
- Woohoo Falls – Originally opened in 1993 when the park was part of SeaWorld and known as Lost Lagoon, scrapped following the 2019 season for Tonga Twister

== Aquatica San Diego ==
In November 2012, Cedar Fair sold Knott's Soak City San Diego in Chula Vista, California to SeaWorld Parks and Entertainment. Under the new ownership, the park was rebranded and reopened as Aquatica San Diego on June 1, 2013.

Originally scheduled for 2021, Aquatica San Diego was rebranded as Sesame Place San Diego in 2022. The Sesame Street-themed park features tame roller coasters, carousels and other family-friendly rides, the street made famous on TV, a parade, live shows and character interactions, among other things. The new park incorporates many of the existing water attractions into the new park, particularly those that are appropriate for younger children. Aquatica San Diego closed for its final season on September 12, 2021.

== See also ==
- Adventure Island
- Discovery Cove
- SeaWorld
- Water Country USA
- Incidents at SeaWorld parks
