= Sesame Street 4-D Movie Magic =

Theme park attraction

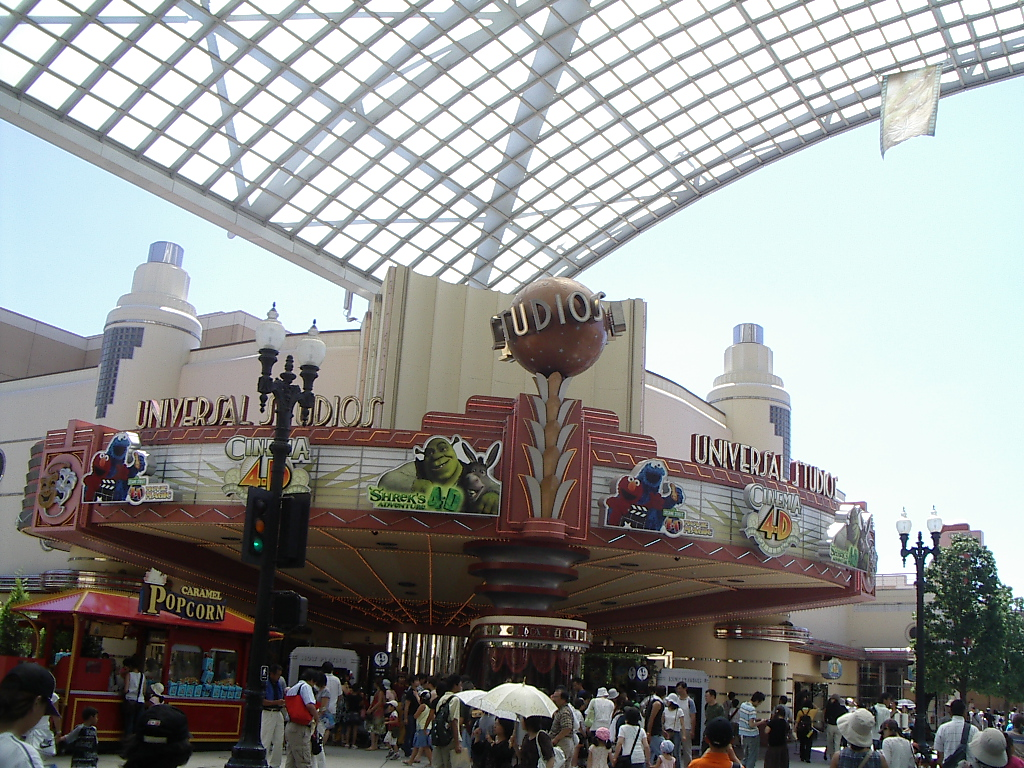
- Entrance at Universal Studios Japan.

Universal Studios Japan
- Area: Hollywood
- Status: Operating
- Opening date: April 26, 2003
- Replaced: Motion Picture Magic

Busch Gardens Williamsburg
- Area: England
- Status: Removed
- Opening date: Spring 2009
- Closing date: 2009
- Replaced: Pirates 4-D (2006 - 2009)
- Replaced by: Pirates 4-D (2011 - 2013)

Busch Gardens Tampa Bay
- Area: Timbuktu
- Status: Removed
- Opening date: March 27, 2010
- Closing date: 2013
- Replaced: Pirates 4-D (2006 - 2010)
- Replaced by: Pirates 4-D (2010 - 2013)

SeaWorld San Diego
- Status: Removed
- Opening date: 2008
- Closing date: 2010
- Replaced: R.L. Stine's Haunted Lighthouse 4-D (2003 - 2007)
- Replaced by: Madagascar Live! Operation: Vacation

SeaWorld San Antonio
- Status: Removed
- Opening date: 2011
- Closing date: 2012
- Replaced: Pirates 4-D (2006 - 2011)
- Replaced by: Pets Ahoy

Ride statistics
- Attraction type: 4-D film
- Theme: Sesame Street
- Quick Queue Premier Formerly available at SeaWorld San Diego

Sesame Street 4-D Movie Magic (known as Sesame Street Presents Lights Camera Imagination! 4-D at SeaWorld and Busch Gardens Williamsburg parks, and Sesame Street Film Festival 4-D at Busch Gardens Tampa) is a 4D film theme park attraction at located at Universal Studios Japan, and formerly SeaWorld San Diego, SeaWorld San Antonio, Busch Gardens Williamsburg, and Busch Gardens Tampa Bay. The attraction, which was made to run at Universal Studios Japan, was later acquired by SeaWorld Parks and Entertainment to run at their Busch Gardens and SeaWorld theme parks. In addition, Busch Gardens parks also include multiple other Sesame Street themed attractions, as part of their Sesame Street Forest of Fun/Sesame Street Safari of Fun park areas. The attraction contained 4-D effects to go along with the film which included spraying water, bursts of air, leg ticklers and fans.

On August 5, 2010, Busch Gardens Tampa Bay announced that Pirates 4-D would return to the Timbuktu Theater. There were three showings of the Sesame Street 4-D Film Festival film followed by three showings of the Pirates film.

== Differences ==
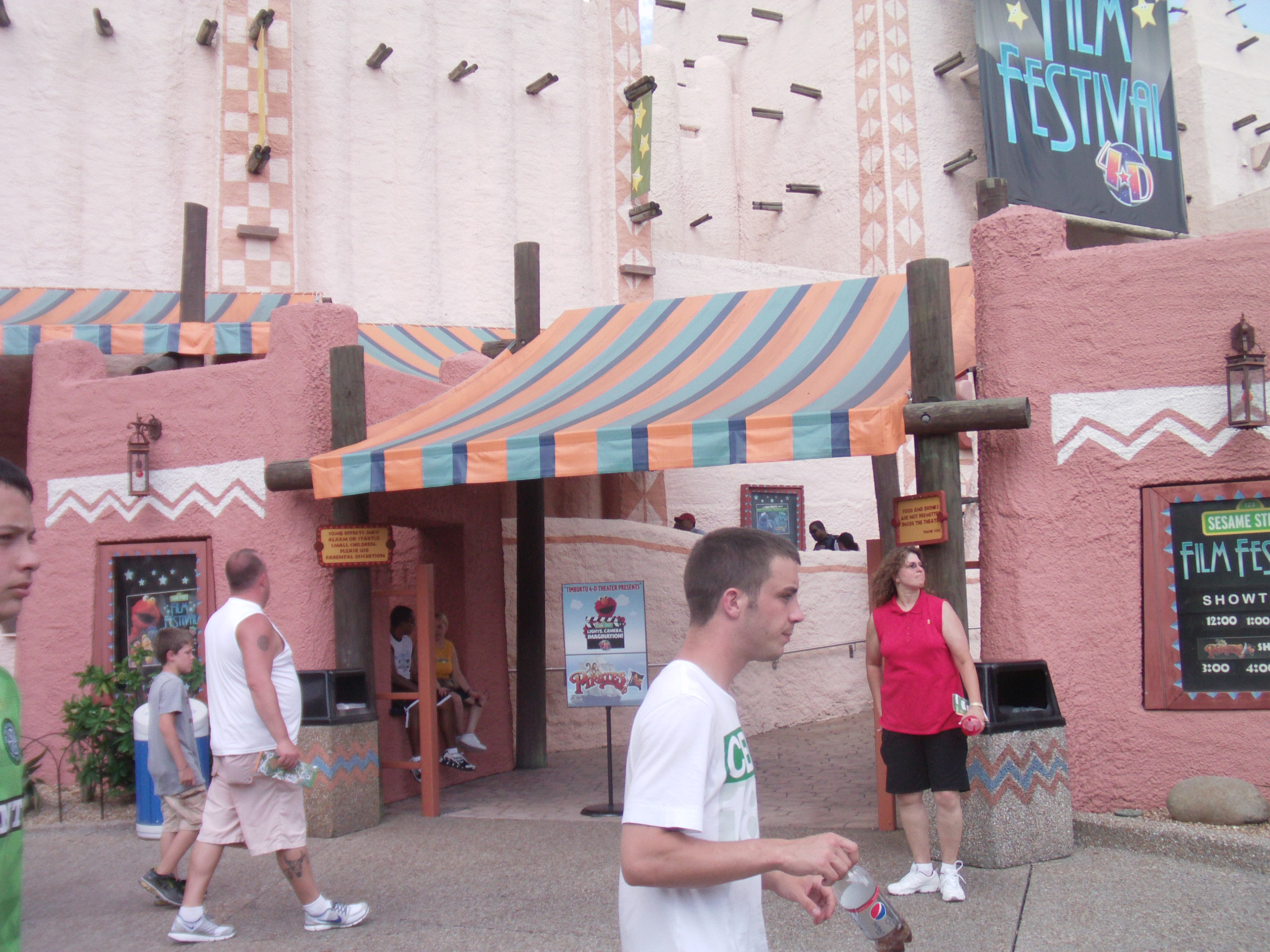
Entrance to Sesame Street Film Festival 4-D at Busch Gardens Tampa Bay.

There are multiple differences between the SeaWorld version of the film versus the original Universal version. This is due to the film having been created for Universal Studios Japan, and so, there are changes in the structure of the Busch Gardens and SeaWorld theaters from the Universal Studios one. This resulted in the experience having to be slightly changed as well, most notably re-dubbing from Japanese to English for the American audiences.

In the SeaWorld films, there is no pre-show, and instead, the preshow to the film is merged into the actual film, resulting in the guests having to wait through the first seven minutes until putting on the glasses before the 3-D effects start. Also at the SeaWorld attractions, the postshow with Elmo being interviewed does not play, but a commercial for SeaWorld Parks and Entertainment's own Sesame Place park instead plays on the theater screen while guests exit, and brochures for Sesame Place are on display at the theater exit.

== Summary ==
Once the guests are inside the ride, a curtain opens and it shows the Sesame Street sign. Then, Big Bird, who is wearing 4-D glasses of his own, appears and compliments the audience on their 4-D glasses. Afterwards, he announces the sponsors, 4 and D, which are presented by the Twiddlebugs. The scene quickly changes to the Around the Corner area of Sesame Street, where Big Bird walks out of the subway station and sings, "Welcome to Sesame Street".

Following the song, Big Bird feels so happy, but suddenly, he notices Bert, Ernie, Grover, Telly, Zoe, and Cookie Monster feeling all sad. He asks them what's wrong and Grover says that everyone was going to present their home movies to everyone, but the projector broke.

Elmo then zooms down the street with his tricycle but crashes it into Oscar's trash can. Much to his dismay, Oscar yells, "Hey! What's all the racket? Keep it down!" Then, Elmo remembers that creating movies needs imagination. Therefore, he decides to let everyone show what they did in their movies by using their imaginations. This delights everyone, except Oscar, who tells Elmo to "SCRAM!".

One by one, each character does their imaginative interpretation of their home movies via 4-D effects. Oscar finally gives in and does his interpretation of his own movie, which happens to be trash all over Sesame Street. Then, a chorus line of stinky socks sings, "I Love Trash".

Suddenly, a thunderstorm hits, drenching all the props. Elmo feels very disappointed that his imaginative movie did not go according to as planned, but Big Bird suggests to him that he should change the movie by using his own imagination. Feeling better about himself, Elmo requests help from the audience by imagining that it's a sunny day. Then, the street changes to a birthday party scene where Elmo sings and flies away on a bunch of balloons and sings.

Everyone else also chips in with the movie, making it a big success. Elmo thanks the audience for their help and remembers "Elmo Loves You" very much and everyone says goodbye. Then, Oscar, gets a bouquet of flowers but feels displeased about it. He angrily closes his trash can lid as a "The End" sign appears. Finally, the Twiddlebugs say goodbye as well and fly away.

== English Voice ==
- Kevin Clash as Elmo
- Caroll Spinney as Oscar and Big Bird (voices only)
- John Tartaglia as Ernie, Anything Muppets and Oscar (puppetry only)
- Fran Brill as Prairie Dawn and Zoe
- Martin P. Robinson as Telly and Anything Muppets
- Eric Jacobson as Grover and Bert
- David Rudman as Cookie Monster and Two-Headed Monster (right head)
- Jerry Nelson as Count von Count and Anything Muppets
- Joey Mazzarino as Telly's Stunt Chicken and Two-Headed Monster (left head)
- Stephanie D'Abruzzo as Anything Muppets and Singing Dirty Sock
- Jennifer Barnhart as Anything Muppets
- Matt Vogel as Singer, Anything Muppets and Big Bird (puppetry and singing voice)
- John Rust as Singing Dirty Sock and Slobbering Dog

== Japanese Voice ==
- Elmo, Bert, Grover: Kōji Ochiai
- Big Bird, Ernie: Mitsuaki Madono
- Cookie Monster, Oscar the Grouch, Count von Count: Tōru Ōkawa
- Telly Monster: Tesshō Genda
- Prairie Dawn, Zoe: Sakiko Tamagawa
- Rosita: Roko Takizawa

== See also ==
- Universal Studios Japan
- SeaWorld San Diego
- Busch Gardens Williamsburg
- Busch Gardens Tampa Bay
- Grover's Alpine Express
- Air Grover
