= Eric McMillan =

Canadian designer

- Born: April 13, 1942 (age 84); Sheffield, England
- Occupation: Architect
- Projects: Ontario Place, Sesame Place, and Parc de la Villette

Eric McMillan (born 13 April 1942) is a Canadian designer who began his career designing exhibitions. In 1972 he started designing play areas and elements that encourage children to learn through play. The concepts were composed of a great variety of materials. He has been referred to as "the father of soft play".

== Early life ==
McMillan was born in Sheffield in northern England in 1942, during an air-raid, to a working-class mother. He was still-born, but was revived by the midwife who dipped him alternately in buckets of cold and warm water.

At the age of five, he moved to North Manchester, where he was cared for by the wife of his blind grandfather.

Requiring glasses that he refused to wear or order to fight off bullying, he attended nine schools between five and fifteen, leaving from St Boniface's RC School in Higher Broughton, at the age of 15, barely literate.

As a child, he played in the wrecks of houses and building sites in the shadow of Strangeways, Manchester. Play was unconstrained freedom.

He enrolled for an apprenticeship as a house painter, and at the college of art encountered students doing more creative courses.

== Career ==
In 1968, he moved from the Canadian Government Exhibition Commission in Ottawa to Toronto to join the design team planning Ontario Place. When Ontario Place opened in 1971, the section of the exhibition he had designed called "Explosions" was the most successful exhibit in that first season. In consequence of this success, he was appointed chief designer for the whole project. The following year saw the opening of the "Children’s Village" land play area and from that project grew his reputation as a designer of children's play attractions. The opening of the "Water Play" area in 1973 secured that reputation. His work introduced ideas like the ball crawl (also known as ball pit), net climb, punch bag forest, birdie glide, roller slide, cave crawl, together toys, foam swamp, water bicycle cannons, balancing buoys, rubber band bounce, and a whole range of interactive play elements. He was inducted into the International Association of Amusement Parks and Attractions (IAAPA) Hall of Fame in 1997.

=== Partnership ===
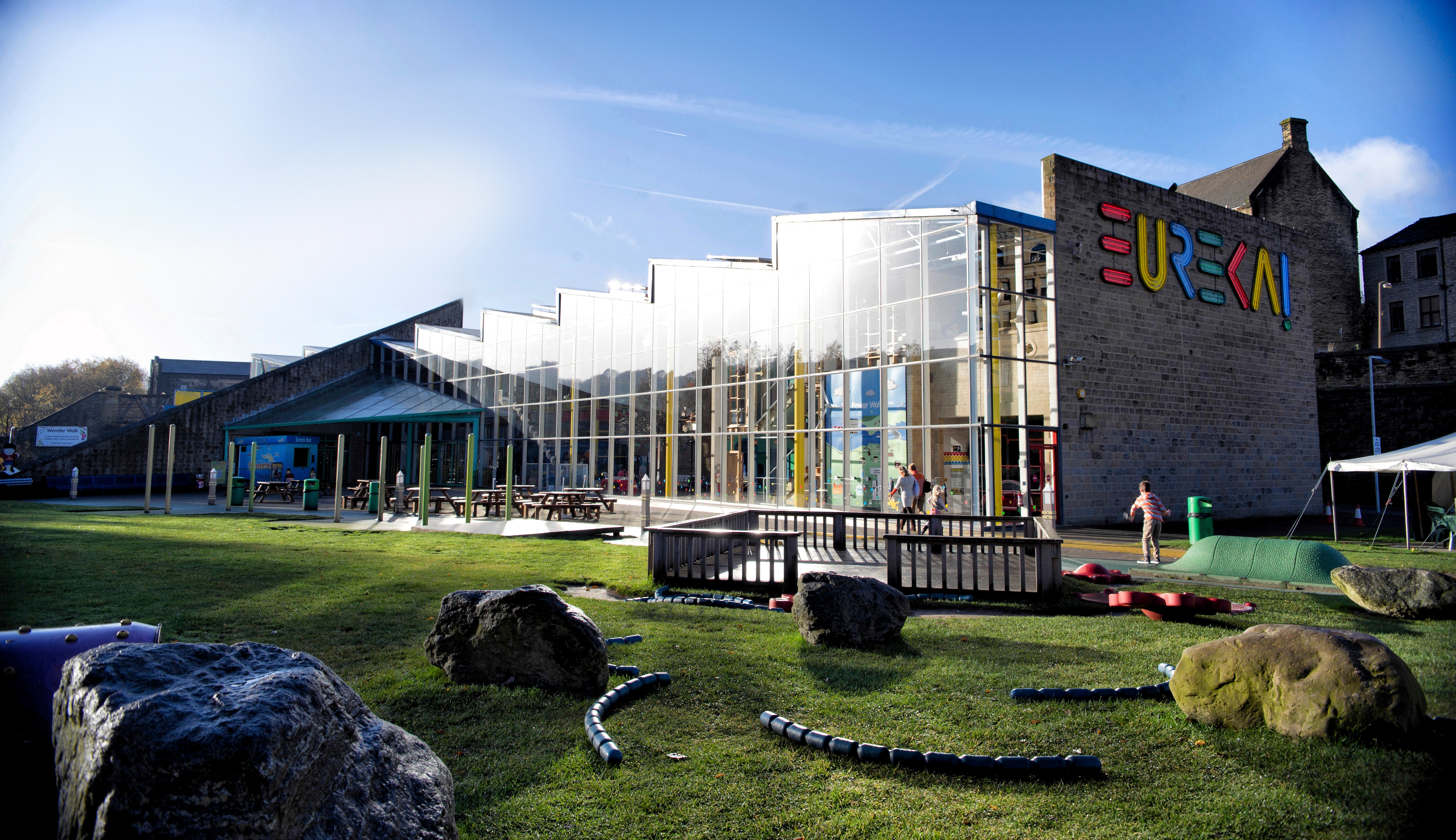
Eureka! The National Children's Museum in Halifax, England

In 1975, together with partners Rosemarie Duell and Len Rydahl, he formed a design partnership and went on to design play attractions around the world. "Cap'n Kids World" at SeaWorld Ohio was the first project built in the U.S. in 1975. His list of projects include: "Sesame Place" in Langhorne, Pennsylvania; "Parc de la Villette" in Paris, France; "Space Science Park" at Space Camp in Huntsville, Alabama; "Boston Children’s Museum Ocean Filter Attraction" in Boston, Massachusetts; "Founders Heritage Park in Nelson, New Zealand; "Eureka! The National Children's Museum" in Halifax, England; and many other projects including his work at Expo 86. He was once described by Time Magazine as "The next Walt Disney."

== Notable projects ==
- The Children's Village and Water Attraction at Ontario Place in Toronto, Canada (1972)
- Cap'n Kids World at SeaWorld Ohio in Aurora, Ohio (1975)
- Cap'n Kids World at SeaWorld San Diego in San Diego, California (1976)
- Old Chicago in Bolingbrook, Illinois (1977)
- Whale of a Time World at Marine World/Africa USA in Redwood Shores, California (1979)
- Sesame Place in Langhorne, Pennsylvania (1980)
- Parc de la Villette in Paris, France (1984)
- Space Science Park at Space Camp in Huntsville, Alabama (1984)
- Boston Children's Museum Ocean Filter Attraction in Boston, Massachusetts (1987)
- Founders Heritage Park in Nelson, New Zealand (1987)
- Eureka! The National Children's Museum in Halifax, England (1988)
