= Super Grover's Box Car Derby =

Ride at SeaWorld parks

SeaWorld San Antonio
- Coordinates: 29.4584°N 98.6998°W
- Status: Removed
- Opening date: April 4, 2004 (as Shamu Express); 2019 (as Super Grover's Box Car Derby)
- Closing date: January 6, 2019 (as Shamu Express); 2024 (as Super Grover's Box Car Derby)

SeaWorld Orlando
- Park section: Sesame Street Land
- Coordinates: 28.4071°N 81.4631°W
- Status: Operating
- Opening date: May 7, 2006 (as Shamu Express); March 27, 2019 (as Super Grover's Box Car Derby)
- Closing date: April 8, 2018 (as Shamu Express)

Sesame Place (San Diego)
- Coordinates: 32.5886°N 117.0112°W
- Status: Operating
- Opening date: March 26, 2022

General statistics
- Type: Steel
- Manufacturer: Zierer
- Designer: Ing.-Büro Stengel GmbH
- Length: 800 ft (240 m)
- Speed: 28 mph (45 km/h)
- Inversions: 0
- Trains: Single train with 14 cars. Riders are arranged 2 across in a single row for a total of 28 riders per train.
- Single rider line Available

Super Grover's Box Car Derby is the name for three similar steel roller coasters at SeaWorld San Antonio and SeaWorld Orlando in the Sesame Street sections of each park, a kid-oriented section, with one newly-built model being located at Sesame Place San Diego. The trains were originally designed to resemble the mascot, Shamu.

The Orlando version closed on April 8, 2018, for the retheme of Shamu's Happy Harbor to a Sesame Street themed area. The San Antonio version closed on January 6, 2019 for a retheme. Both versions reopened later in 2019 as Super Grover's Box Car Derby. The San Antonio closed on 2024 and is now demolished. Another clone of the ride is located at Sesame Place San Diego and opened with the park in March 2022.
