= Pirates 4-D =

1999 film

SeaWorld Ohio
- Status: Removed
- Opening date: 10 May 1997
- Closing date: 2000 (Park sold to Six Flags 2001–2003)

Busch Gardens Williamsburg
- Area: England
- Status: Removed
- Opening date: Spring 2006; 16 July 2011 The Original; Reopen 17 December 2011
- Closing date: March 2009; 2013
- Replaced: R.L. Stine’s Haunted Lighthouse 4-D (2003–2006)
- Replaced by: London Rocks

Thorpe Park
- Status: Removed
- Opening date: 20 March 1999
- Closing date: 2007
- Replaced by: Time Voyagers

Busch Gardens Tampa Bay
- Area: Timbuktu
- Status: Removed
- Opening date: 1. Spring 2006; 2. 5 August 2010
- Closing date: 1. March 2010; 2. 7 July 2013
- Replaced: R.L. Stine's Haunted Lighthouse 4-D (2003–2006)
- Replaced by: Opening Night Critters

SeaWorld San Diego
- Status: Removed
- Opening date: May 2000
- Closing date: 2003
- Replaced by: R.L. Stine’s Haunted Lighthouse 4-D (2003–2007)

SeaWorld San Antonio
- Status: Removed
- Opening date: May 2006
- Closing date: 2011
- Replaced by: Sesame Street 4-D Movie Magic

Six Flags New Orleans
- Status: Removed
- Opening date: May 2000
- Closing date: 2003
- Replaced by: SpongeBob SquarePants 4-D (2003–2005)

Noah's Ark Water Park
- Status: Removed
- Opening date: 2011
- Closing date: 2015
- Replaced: SpongeBob SquarePants 4-D (2007-2010)
- Replaced by: Ice Age 4-D (2015-2016); The LEGO Movie: The 4-D Experience (2017)

Luxor Hotel
- Status: Removed
- Opening date: 2007
- Closing date: 2009

Ride statistics
- Attraction type: 4-D Film
- Theme: Pirates
- Duration: 15 minutes and 17 minutes
- Producer: Renaissance Entertainment
- Distributor: Iwerks Entertainment
- Starring: Leslie Nielsen; Eric Idle; Adam Wylie; Rodney Dangerfield
- Assistive listening available

Pirates 4D (also known as Pirates 3D) was an attraction film designed to be shown in a specially-built or remodeled theater space in a theme park, featuring in-theater special effects, sometimes referred to as a 4D film.

The film itself is a dual strip 70mm 3D film short, featuring Leslie Nielsen and Eric Idle, written by Idle and directed by longtime theme park film director Keith Melton. It was produced by Renaissance Entertainment and Busch Entertainment Corporation, and distributed by Iwerks Entertainment. It was released in 1999, and first shown at Sea World Ohio (then owned by Busch), at two Busch Gardens parks, and at Thorpe Park in England, then owned by The Tussauds Group, which was the earliest overseas venue.

== Venues ==
The film was produced exclusively for theme park usage. It was formerly shown at Sea World Ohio in Aurora, Ohio, Busch Gardens Williamsburg, in Williamsburg, Virginia, Busch Gardens Tampa Bay in Tampa, Florida, Thorpe Park in Chertsey, Surrey, England, SeaWorld San Diego in San Diego, California, SeaWorld San Antonio in San Antonio, Texas, Hansa Park in Sierksdorf, Germany, Aquapulco Piratenwelt of the Eurothermen Resort Bad Schallerbach in Austria, Mirabilandia in Italy, Six Flags New Orleans in New Orleans, Louisiana, Noah's Ark Water Park in Wisconsin Dells, Wisconsin, Enchanted Kingdom in the Philippines, the Luxor Casino in Las Vegas, Nevada and Phantasialand in Brühl, Germany. It is still open at 4D AdventureLand on Sentosa Island, Singapore, as of 2025.

The show at Busch Gardens Tampa Bay was closed in March 2010 to make way for Sesame Street Film Festival 4-D, but due to guest demand, the attraction returned on August 5, 2010 and featured three showings a day after three showings of the "Sesame Street" film. On 7 July 2013, Busch Gardens Tampa announced that Pirates 4-D had closed again in Timbuktu (now Pantopia) along with Timbuktu Theater to make way for a new show and Pantopia Theater.

== Synopsis ==
Davie (Adam Wylie), a cabin boy who was betrayed and marooned by the nasty Captain Lucky (Leslie Nielsen) on Pirate Island, escapes the captain's trap and sets up booby traps with the help of a monkey named Chester to catch Lucky and his crew when he returns to the island to recover a treasure he buried there. The captain, with a French pirate named Pierre (Eric Idle) as his first mate, returns soon after, along with his new crew. Two of the pirates are caught in a trap involving crabs. The next pirate has a bee hive dropped on his head, while the next is hit in the back by a cactus. Pierre is caught in a trap involving pigeons, which defecate on him. After the booby traps leave all the pirates behind except for the Captain and Pierre, Lucky leads Pierre into a dark cave on the island where his treasure is hidden. Upon entering the cave, Pierre encounters a giant spider and various bats, before running into the skeletons of Lucky's former crew, having been hung by shackles to the cave's walls. Lucky approaches Pierre, menacing him with "To me...or not to me". The captain finds his treasure chest, which now holds a booby trap. After the captain begins caressing the chest's treasures, the chest locks him with shackles and drags him out of the cave and into a lake, past the pigeons. Meanwhile, the pirate crew discovers Davie, and prepare to attack him, before Pierre shows up with the skeletons of Lucky's last crew. Lucky eventually escapes the shackles and begins to have a sword fight with Davie, whom he disarms. They all return to the ship, where the crew makes Lucky walk the plank, and Davie is named as the crew's new captain. As the screen begins to close to black, Lucky appears in front of it and spits out water, telling the audience "I'll be back" before the closing screen bonks him and knocks him out. The film trailer may be seen on YouTube. An additional sequence featuring Rodney Dangerfield was only included in the Busch/SeaWorld Attractions.

== Effects ==
Viewers of the film wear polarized 3D glasses in order to experience the film's 3D effects. The 4-D effects are of two general types: in-theater special effects, such as water cannons, and specialized seating, with built-in effects and audio.

The in-theater effects packages were sometimes produced by different manufacturers. Busch Entertainment Corporation (BEC) developed its own package for its initial installations, as did Thorpe Park. Later installations most likely utilized a more common package which was the early Iwerks 3D/4D FX Theatre System.

Thorpe Park's package was developed by Technology Design Associates (TDA), and integrated by Advanced Entertainment Technology (AET).

Each package differed somewhat as to which effects were included, and the specific application of each, however, there were many similarities, driven by moments built into the film. For example, at the end of the film, after Captain Lucky walks the plank, he surfaces and spits water into the camera. Simultaneously, one or more large water cannons are discharged from below the screen, sending a water spray out into the audience. The guests in the front rows were often soaked.

The specialized 4D film seating featured in-seat sound, vibrators, water squirts, bursts of air and wires which push against the viewers' feet.

== Technical information ==
The film was released as a 70 mm/5 perforation dual print polarized 3-D attraction film 17 minutes in length, and was directed by Keith Melton, and written by Eric Idle. It was in Eastman Color, and was filmed by 3-D Cinematographer Peter Anderson in a 2.1:1 aspect ratio. It featured Dolby Digital sound, although this was usually not used.

The Iwerks seating was an early version of a product now called Simex-Iwerks 4-D Seats. This early version was far less capable than the current model, with the major difference being the lack of the current motion simulator base (3 DOF) capabilities.

The BEC seats and the TDA/AET seats were quite similar. Both featured the following effects: water spray, wind effect, bats effect, seat speakers and seat vibrators. The BEC seats were installed at Busch Gardens Williamsburg, and replaced an earlier prototype at Sea World Ohio. The TDA/AET seats were used at Thorpe Park.

Besides the water cannons noted above, the in-house effects included a "bird droppings" effect, consisting of a burst of warm water sprayed on the audience from the ceiling when the birds are released on the pirates, a large smoke ring effect, discharged over the audience when the ship's cannon is shot toward the camera, and a glittering gold lighting effect around the proscenium when Lucky's treasure is revealed.

The audio for Pirates 4-D was usually stored on an outboard device, and synchronized to the film. The early SeaWorld/Busch Gardens venues used an 8 channel Tascam DA-88 Digital Audio Tape (DAT) deck, while the Thorpe Park installation used a 12 channel Alcorn McBride Digital Binloop. This was necessary because the Dolby Digital format had only six tracks available for audio, and all were used for the cinema speakers. Busch used the seventh channel for the seat speakers. Thorpe Park used four channels for the seat speakers, one for a point source speaker for Justa, its Animatronic pirate parrot, and the twelfth for the preshow.
