= Wahoo Run =

Water slide in Tampa, Florida, United States

Adventure Island (water park)
- Status: Closed
- Cost: $1.7 million
- Opening date: 2000
- Closing date: 2021

General statistics
- Type: Water slide
- Manufacturer: ProSlide Technology
- Designer: ProSlide Technology
- Model: DarkMAMMOTH
- Height: 56 ft (17 m)
- Length: 600 ft (180 m)
- Speed: 11 mph (18 km/h)

Wahoo Run was a family water slide at Adventure Island in Tampa, Florida, operated by SeaWorld Parks and Entertainment. The 600-foot-long ProSlide Mammoth River was mostly enclosed. Riders aboard three-person roundrafts pass through four waterfall curtains before ending in a splash pool. Wahoo Run was named for a game fish, the wahoo, and for the "screaming expected from riders".

In 2022, the ride reopened as Wahoo Remix; the former dark sections are illuminated with multi-color LED lights synchronized with sound elements.
