= Water Country USA =

Water park in York County, Virginia, United States

- Interactive map of Water Country USA
- Location: York County, Virginia, U.S.
- Coordinates: 37°15′45.1″N 76°38′8.2″W
- Opened: June 20, 1984; 42 years ago
- Owner: United Parks & Resorts
- Slogan: "Virginia's Largest Family Water Park!"
- Operating season: May – September

Attractions
- Water rides: 17
- Website: watercountryusa.com

Water Country USA is a water park in York County, Virginia, United States, near Williamsburg, Virginia. It is the Mid-Atlantic's largest water park, and it offers live entertainment, shops and restaurants, water rides, and other family attractions, some of which have a 1950s or 1960s surf theme. It is owned by United Parks & Resorts. The park is just a few miles away from Busch Gardens Williamsburg, with which it shares clientele. Multi-park passes are available, and a parking pass at Water Country USA is valid for same-day entry to Busch Gardens Williamsburg.

== Slides and attractions ==
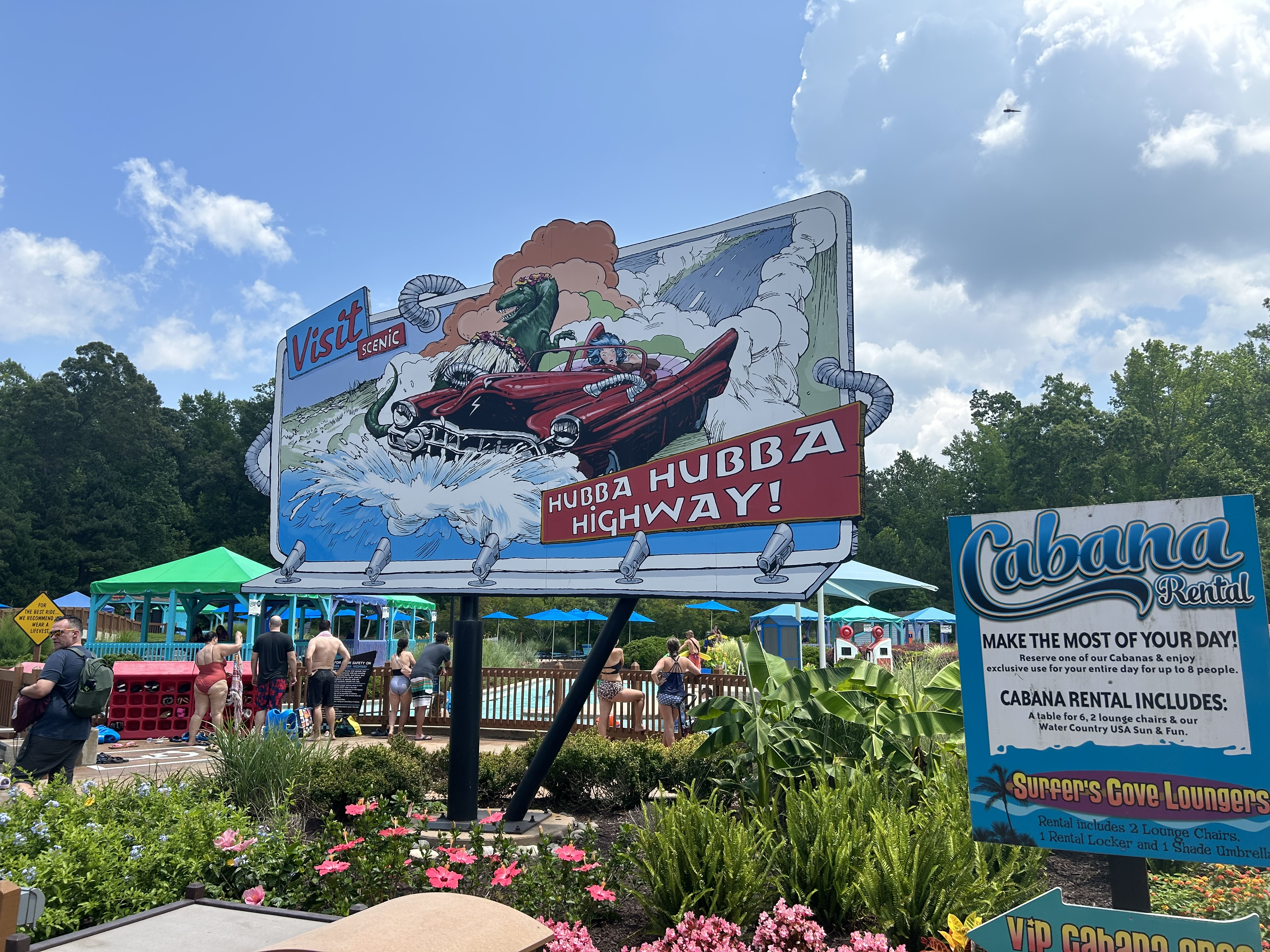
Sign for Hubba Hubba Highway in Water Country USA

- Aquazoid Amped: An 863-foot-long Proslide raft slide that is entirely enclosed. It was previously known as Aquazoid however in 2022 LED lighting, sound effects and music were added into the slide's enclosure, and its name and theme was changed to Aquazoid Amped.
- Big Daddy Falls: A Proslide raft slide that is mostly open, and features a "lazy river" section near the end of the slide that winds through and around waterfalls. This is followed by a final plunge. The whole slide is 670 feet long.
- Colossal Curl: Installed in 2014, this Proslide mega raft slide features a funnel element (Tornado 24), as well as a final element known as the TornadoWave 60 where riders soar up and down a giant wall. The slide is ridden in four-person CloverLeaf tubes.
- Cow-A-Bunga: A children's area featuring three smaller slides, one utilized with double tubes, a shallow pool and a variety of splash features.
- Cutback Water Coaster: Opened in 2019, this Proslide water coaster features five "FlyingSaucer" sections where the raft whips around a tilted saucer, giving off an advertised "drop and dive" section. The slide also features three uphill sections made possible by a water jet propulsion system. The slide is more than 850 feet long, utilizes four-person inline rafts and mimics the layout of the former Meltdown slide that it replaced.
- High Tide Harbor: A multi-level water play structure created by ProSlide with over 100 interactive water elements including buckets, 4 slides, sprayers, and cannons. Replaced H2O UFO in 2025.
- Hubba Hubba Highway: A 1500-foot-long lazy river on the eastern side of the waterpark. There are plenty of splash features guaranteed to get all riders wet. This was installed in 2003.
- Jammin' Jukebox: A slide tower hosting three body slides that were constructed in 2008. The tower formerly was occupied by the Peppermint Twist body slides.
- Jet Scream: Presumed to be one of the park's original slide complexes, Jet Scream is made up of four inner tube slides that are each more than 400 feet long and are advertised to travel at an average speed of 25 mph. These slides are mostly open but do feature a few small, enclosed sections.
- Little Bopper: A small, kid-friendly corkscrew slide that was formerly Little Twister in a different section of Adventure Isle, which would become Rock 'n' Roll Island in 2008. It is now painted yellow instead of the original pink.
- Lil' Surfers Splash Pad: A small toddler play area with some very small slides and splash elements, including fountains and spray cannons.
- Malibu Pipeline: Two Proslide inner tube slides that span more than 450 feet in length and are mostly enclosed. Both feature maximum plunge finales of 55 feet into a 3-foot-deep pool. Presumed to have opened in the late 1990s. The two slides are named "Bonzai" and "Oahu".
- Nitro Racer: A six-lane Proslide mat racer that is around 320 feet long. Sliders go down headfirst, just like any other common mat racer. This is a relatively short ride estimated to be around 4 seconds. Installed in 1998.
- Rambling River: This is a 736-foot-long lazy river that winds around the Rock'n'Roll Island (formerly Adventure Isle) section of the park. This is significantly shorter in length than the park's existing Hubba Hubba Highway.
- Riptide Race: A 520-foot dueling water slide sitting 54 feet off the ground, opened in 2023.
- Rock 'n' Roll Island; An area of the park that was formerly known as Adventure Isle, but was renovated in 2008 to what it currently is. It includes a newer trio of twisting body slides (Jammin' Jukebox), a lazy river making up the perimeter of the area (Rambling River), an advertised 11,000 square foot activity pool, a "log cross" activity and a children's slide named The Little Bopper.
- Surfer's Bay: A wave pool that is advertised as the largest in the state at 23,000 square feet, with a maximum depth of 8 feet. Every 10 minutes, the wave pool generates waves reaching 4 feet high that cycles for 8 minutes at a time. The pool likely opened with the park in 1984.
- Vanish Point: A 75-foot-tall quadruple-speed slide complex manufactured by Proslide in 2011. There are two pairs of speed slides within Vanish Point. Riders can either plunge down 300-foot-long speed slides or slide through one of two enclosed helixes that utilize Proslide's SKYBOX technology, a drop pod that launches riders into the slide via a trapdoor. The complex is located next to the Cutback Water Coaster, or at the time that it was built, Meltdown.
- Wild Thang: A 500-foot long inner tube slide that is completely open. Two person tubes are utilized on this slide.

== Defunct rides and attractions ==
- Aquazoid: An 863-foot-long Proslide raft slide that is mostly enclosed. The enclosed portions, however, are mostly pitch black. Sat idle from 2019-2021. It was renamed Aquazoid Amped for the 2022 season which added LED lighting, sound effects and music around the slide's enclosure.
- Atomic Breakers: A series of slides and splash pools. Closed and removed 2007. This ride was previously known as Runaway Rapids.
- Kritter Korral: A sea-themed toddler play area with some very small slides in the shape of sea creatures scattered throughout a 2-foot-deep pool. Replaced with Lil' Surfers Splash Pad.
- Lemon Drop: 2 short Yellow body flumes which dropped into a deep (10 ft) section of the Adventure Isle pool. Closed and removed in 2008. Early on, this ride had three tubes.
- Little Twister: A small pink children's water slide in the Adventure Isle area. Moved adjacent to the Jammin' Juke Box slide tower in the 2008 season with the change to Rock 'n' Roll Island. Renamed "Little Bopper".
- Peppermint Twist: Two steep purple-colored body slides take riders through a 180-degree curve. This ride closed following the 2007 season. The tower, however, remains intact and is used as the tower for the new Jammin' Jukebox body slides. This ride was previously known as Sonic Whip.
- Volleyball Courts: Several beach volleyball courts that took up the space where Hubba Hubba Highway is now, and before that were located across from Jet Scream where the lockers are. (Catering was where the restrooms are.)
- Meltdown: Closed at the end of 2018 season to make way for an enhanced new launched ProSlide turboslide water coaster (Cutback). Was an inline boat slide that opened in 2000 and traveled down a series of banked turns, resulting in a bobsled type experience. The new Cutback water coaster mimics the layout of Meltdown with the addition of saucers and uphill sections.
- Rampage: Two toboggan style slides that sent riders down a ramp at a 60-degree incline, building enough speed to skip the 120-foot-long shallow landing pool. This slide was formerly one of 2 of its kind in the world, following the removal of Thunderbolt at World Waterpark in 2014 and Everglides at Adventure Island in 2017. However, "Screamin Mimi" at Water World still operated. Sitting but not operating from 2019-2022. Demolished in December 2022 to make room for Riptide Race
- H2O UFO: A kids' area with splash features and slides, as well as two scaled-down Proslide tube slides. This was advertised as the largest kids' area in the waterpark before High Tide Harbor was built in 2025 to replace it.

== Shows ==
- Aquabatics! This was a diving themed show, with divers and acrobats performing many different stunts, and a final "high-dive" at the end. The dive tower was dismantled in 2015 before the season started.

== See also ==
- List of water parks
