= Discovery Cove =

Theme park in Orlando, Florida

- Interactive map of Discovery Cove
- Location: Orlando, Florida, United States
- Coordinates: 28°24′19.50″N 81°27′42″W
- Opened: July 1, 2000; 26 years ago
- Owner: United Parks & Resorts
- Operated by: United Parks & Resorts
- Website: www.discoverycove.com

Discovery Cove is a theme park owned and operated by United Parks & Resorts, and located in Orlando, Florida. It is the sister park of SeaWorld Orlando and Aquatica Orlando. Visitors to the park can interact with a range of marine animals including bottlenose dolphins.

== Attractions ==
The main experience at Discovery Cove is swimming with a dolphin, where visitors can "talk, touch, play and swim" with bottlenose dolphins.

The park contains a free-flight aviary, which contains over 250 tropical birds including parrots, toucans, and over 30 other species of exotic birds. The heated Tropical River runs through the aviary and circles the park, allowing guests to float past an assortment of the Discovery Cove's beaches, waterfalls, and rainforest landscape. The Tropical River runs into the park's freshwater resort pool.

In June 2011, the park expanded with the opening of The Grand Reef. This reef was needed due to the original reef having a persistent salt water leak, which affected the ground water, and replaced the original reef with Freshwater Oasis. The Grand Reef features a white-sand beach, palm-lined island and underwater grottos filled with moray eels, reef sharks and scores of other tropical fish. Activities range from snorkeling with eagle rays to crossing a rope bridge over a shark-filled lagoon.

In summer 2012, the park introduced the Freshwater Oasis. The area features water filled trails covered by a rainforest canopy that contains a viewing glass window featuring an exhibit for Asian small-clawed otters and an island in the center of the pool known as Primate Island containing White-headed marmosets.

== Admission ==
Three different admission options are offered by the park, including the dolphin-swim, non-dolphin-swim and "Trainer for a Day" packages. The park also sells multi-park tickets that include admission to SeaWorld Orlando, Aquatica Orlando, and Busch Gardens Tampa. Reservations for Discovery Cove are required and a maximum of 1600 guests can be present in the park at any one time. Discounts are often available for Florida residents.

== Incidents ==
In 2008, a bottlenose dolphin named Sharky (a.k.a. Natasha) at Discovery Cove died after colliding with another dolphin during aerial movement signaled by park staff. The cause of death was listed as traumatic cervical vertebral fracture. A park representative said it was an "unfortunate, random incident," and that the other dolphin survived and was being watched by veterinarians. In response, animal rights group PETA released a statement saying it is not uncommon for captive dolphins to die decades short of natural life expectancy as Sharky did, and that tragedies are "inevitable when these animals are required to perform tricks that are as unnatural to them as they are inhumane."

In 2024, a 13-year-old park guest died after being found unresponsive in a pool and transported to a hospital in critical condition. The medical examiner listed the cause of death as accidental drowning. The police said the investigation is active and ongoing.
