= Sesame Place =

Theme park chain

- Owner: United Parks & Resorts (US); Sesame Workshop (license); Tokyotokeiba Co. Ltd. (Japan)
- Operated by: United Parks & Resorts (US); Tokyotokeiba Co. Ltd. (Japan)
- Theme: Sesame Street
- Website: Sesame Place (United Parks)

Sesame Place is a theme park chain based on the children's educational television program Sesame Street. In the United States, it is owned and operated by United Parks & Resorts under an exclusive license from Sesame Workshop, the non-profit owner of Sesame Street. Sesame Place Philadelphia opened in 1980; Sesame Place San Diego opened in 2022.

== History ==
In the United States, Anheuser-Busch was the park's original owner, operating it under its United Parks & Resorts subsidiary. In 2008, Anheuser-Busch was purchased by InBev to form Anheuser-Busch InBev, which then sold its theme park division to The Blackstone Group in 2009. Under new ownership, from 2009 into 2010, children's areas in Busch Gardens and SeaWorld parks were converted to Sesame Street-themed areas. SeaWorld Orlando, however, was the lone holdout until its Shamu's Happy Harbour area was converted into, and reopened as, "Sesame Street Land" in 2019.

== Parks ==
=== Sesame Place Philadelphia ===
Sesame Place Philadelphia was the first Sesame Street theme park to be operated in the United States. It opened in 1980.

=== Sesame Place (Texas) ===
A second Sesame Place park opened in Irving, Texas in June 1982. The $10 million Texas park was located on 30.3 acres (12.26 ha) near State Highway 183, and differed from the Pennsylvania location in that most attractions were indoors. The Texas park never reopened after the fall season ended in October 1984 and was shut down permanently in January 1985 due to unprofitability and declining attendance.

=== Tokyo Sesame Place ===
A park in Tokyo, Japan titled Tokyo Sesame Place opened on October 10, 1990, and was the first Sesame Street theme park to operate outside the United States. It shared no connection with the US parks and was owned and operated by the management of the nearby Tokyo Summerland water park - Tokyotokeiba Co. Ltd.

When compared to the US parks, this park was a lot smaller with simple child-friendly attractions and playground equipment, and was mostly elevated. Attendees entered the park through a steep escalator that would reach up to Big Bird's mouth.

Tokyo Summerland announced the closure of Tokyo Sesame Place in September 2006 and closed as planned on December 31 of that year. The owners' citied changes in the business environment and restructuring for its closure. The place was originally intended to be used for future development within the Tokyo Summerland complex, but since 2024 the site has remained disused.

=== Sesame Place San Diego ===
In 2017, a fourth location was announced, to open "no later than" mid-2021. In 2019, it was announced that Aquatica San Diego near San Diego, California would be replaced by a new Sesame Place theme park by Spring 2021. However, due to the COVID-19 pandemic causing construction to pause, the park did not open until the following year in March 2022.

== Other Sesame Street-related parks and areas ==
=== Parque Plaza Sesamo ===
In 1994, a Sesame Street-themed amusement park called Parque Plaza Sesamo (based on the Mexican co-production Plaza Sésamo) was opened in Monterrey, Mexico. According to TEA's Global Attractions Attendance Report, Parque Plaza Sésamo is one of Latin America's highest ranking theme parks by attendance, with 1.2 million visitors per year.

On May 18, 2022, the park announced that it would rebrand as Parque Fiesta Aventuras for the 2022 season following a two-year period of closure. The reason for the rebranding was not disclosed by the park, but is likely that the park terminated its license to use the Plaza Sésamo branding and characters.

The park later closed for good after the 2024 season.

=== Universal Studios Japan ===
Universal Studios Japan has a Sesame Street themed section in their Universal Wonderland themed area.

=== Sésamo Aventura ===
In Salou, Spain, PortAventura Park has a Sesame Street-themed area called Sésamo Aventura, which opened in 2011.
