= Turtle: The Incredible Journey =

- Directed by: Nick Stringer
- Written by: Nick Stringer
- Produced by: Sarah Cunliffe, Downey, Sam Taylor
- Narrated by: Miranda Richardson
- Production companies: SeaWorld Pictures; MTN Movies; Tradewind Pictures; Australian Film Institute
- Distributed by: Hannover House
- Release dates: 12 September 2009 (Toronto International Film Festival); 24 June 2011 (United States)
- Running time: 81 minutes
- Countries: United Kingdom; Austria; Germany
- Box office: $258,383

Turtle: The Incredible Journey is a 2009 documentary film narrated by Miranda Richardson and directed by Nick Stringer. The film was co-produced by MTN Movies and SeaWorld Pictures and Tradewind Pictures, and distributed in the United States by Hannover House.

== Plot ==
Each season, two million loggerhead sea turtles are hatched but one in ten thousand turtles will return to lay their eggs. This documentary depicts a female loggerhead sea turtle as she follows the path of her ancestors on a journey. Embarking from a beach in Florida, she rides the Gulf Stream to the frozen north, swimming around the entire North Atlantic to Africa and then back to the beach where she was born.

== Reception ==
On the review aggregator website Rotten Tomatoes, the film holds an approval rating of 69%, based on 16 reviews, with an average rating of 5.9/10.

== Awards ==
- Australian Cinematographers Society: "Gold Award"
- Australian Cinematographers Society: "President Award"
- Hof Kinderfilmfest: "Audience Award"
