= Jim Atchison =

American business executive

- Education: University of South Florida (BA); University of Central Florida (MBA)

Jim Atchison is an American business executive. He was the president and chief executive officer of SeaWorld Parks & Entertainment, positions he had held since 2009. On December 11, 2014 he resigned. SeaWorld acknowledged in August 2014 that the film Blackfish had hurt revenues at its San Diego, California park. At the time of Atchison's resignation the company's share price had fallen 44% that year.

He previously served as president and chief operating officer of Busch Entertainment Corporation from 2007 to 2009, and as Executive Vice President and General Manager of SeaWorld Orlando from 2003 to 2007.

In 2018, SeaWorld and Atchison agreed to pay over $5 million to settle federal charges that the company hid from investors the negative impact that Blackfish had on the business. As part of the indictment, according to the Securities and Exchange Commission, Atchison sold Seaworld stock in the first quarter of 2014 in order to hide the loss in revenue.

Atchison is a past member of the University of Central Florida Board of Trustees. He graduated from the University of South Florida with a Bachelor's in Business Administration, and from UCF with a Master's of Business Administration (MBA) in 1992.
