= Sesame Place Philadelphia =

Theme park in Langhorne, Pennsylvania

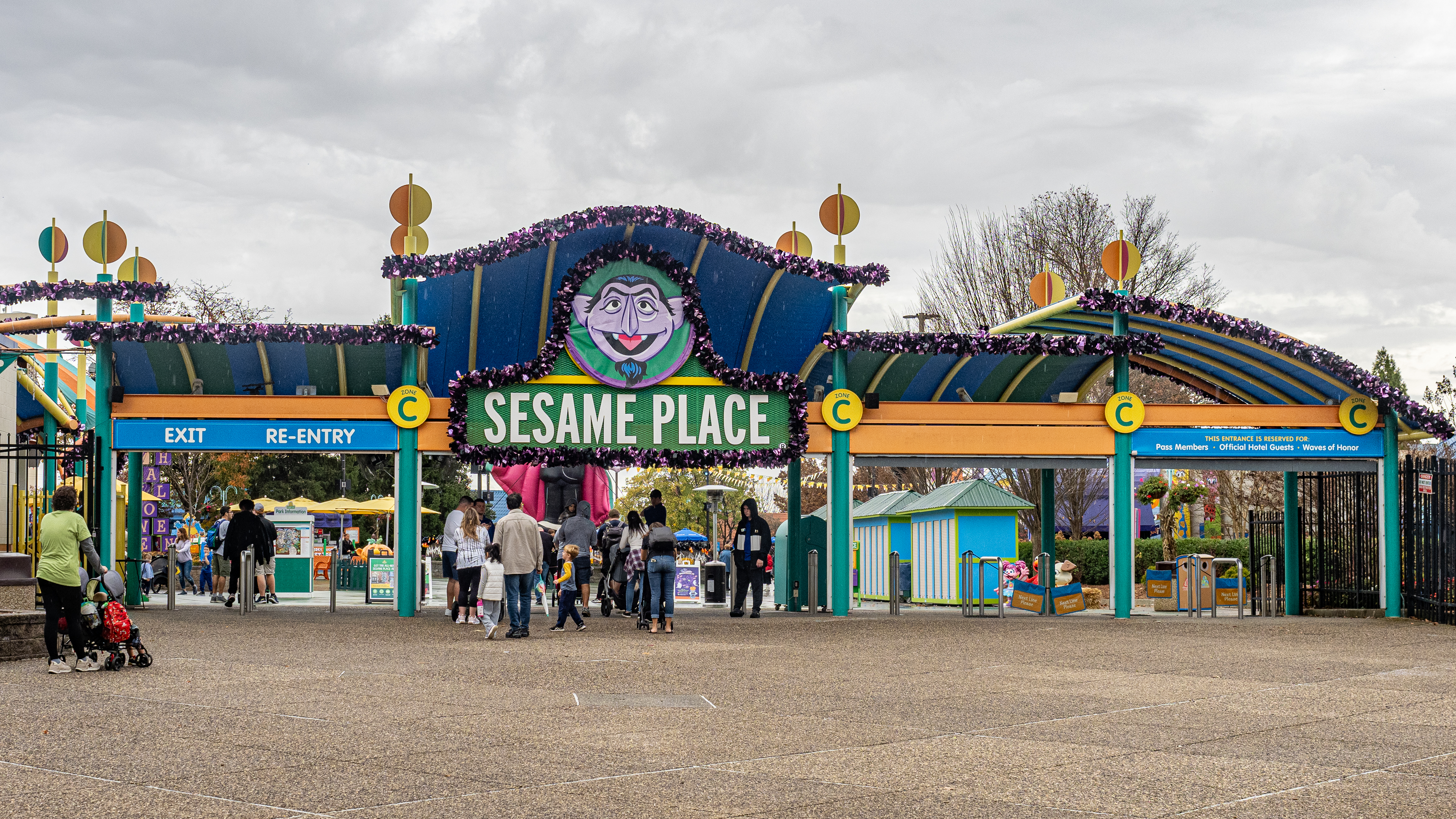
- Interactive map of Sesame Place Philadelphia
- Location: Middletown Township, Bucks County, Pennsylvania, United States
- Coordinates: 40°11′06″N 74°52′19″W
- Status: Operating
- Opened: July 30, 1980; 45 years ago
- Owner: United Parks & Resorts
- Operated by: United Parks & Resorts
- Theme: Sesame Street
- Slogan: Go Before They Grow
- Operating season: Year Round
- Area: 14 acres (5.7 ha)

Attractions
- Total: 26
- Roller coasters: 2
- Water rides: 9
- Website: Sesame Place Philadelphia Homepage

Sesame Place Philadelphia is a children's theme park and water park based on the children's educational television program Sesame Street. It is one of the two Sesame Place theme parks owned and operated by United Parks & Resorts under an exclusive license from Sesame Workshop, the non-profit owner of Sesame Street. Located outside of Philadelphia in Middletown Township, Bucks County, Pennsylvania (with a Langhorne mailing address), it is the older of the two Sesame Street theme parks in the United States (the other being Sesame Place San Diego). Sesame Place Philadelphia includes a variety of rides, shows and water attractions suited for young children, and is the first theme park in the world to become a certified autism center.

== History ==
Sesame Place first opened in 1980 near the Oxford Valley Mall and initiated the expansion of the commercial complex in the vicinity. It was designed by Eric McMillan, a Canadian designer, Sandra Hanna of Lambertville, New Jersey and several other designers.

The park is open from early May through Halloween for The Count's Halloween "Spooktacular", and mid-November through December for "A Very Furry Christmas". The original park was 3 acres (1.2 ha) and featured play areas and large computer labs where kids could color their favorite Sesame Street characters. Since then, it has expanded to 14 acres (5.7 ha) with rides and water attractions. The expansions included the construction of Cookie's Monster Land in 2014 – the park's largest renovation to date.

The theme park is described as having implemented features to make it accessible to children with autism, and on World Autism Awareness Day in 2018 was announced to be the first theme park that is a Certified Autism Center. Certified Autism Centers "[help] businesses better serve guests and clients with cognitive disorders, including autism".

In 2007, it became the first theme park in Pennsylvania to become completely smoke-free.

Beginning in January 2021, the park began its year-round operation. The park's previous operating season ran from April through early January; however, 2021 was the first time the park has ever been open during the winter months. Each weekend was a limited capacity event that featured rides, dance parties, and a parade. In 2023, Sesame Place did not continue year-round operation but only closed between mid-January to mid-February.

In July 2022, a family claimed in an Instagram post that the character Rosita snubbed their two young black children by ignoring them as they waved to her. The video went viral as other users posted similar incidents of costumed characters and black children, with those on social media calling for a boycott of the park. The park released a statement that the costume had made it difficult for the performer to see the girls. They later followed with another statement that the performer had not intentionally snubbed the girls, but instead rejected a request "from someone in the crowd who asked Rosita to hold their child for a photo, which is not permitted." On July 19, Sesame Place Philadelphia formally apologized to the family and invited the family back for a personal meet-and-greet with the characters. They also announced that their employees will undergo racial bias training to ensure park guests have an "inclusive, equitable and entertaining" experience.

== Attractions ==
Sesame Place features dry rides and water rides. Dry rides are open during Elmo's Springtacular, the summer season, The Count's Halloween Spooktacular and A Very Furry Christmas. Water rides are open only in the summer season (Memorial Day-Labor Day). Other rides are only operated during Elmo's Springtacular, The Count's Halloween Spooktacular, or A Very Furry Christmas.

=== Sesame Plaza ===
The front entrance.

Name	Manufacturer	Opened	Description
Vapor Trail	Vekoma	1998	A Super Grover-themed custom Vekoma family roller coaster with several helixes.
Sunny Day Carousel	Chance Rides	2008	A carousel with Sesame Street-designed horses. It was originally located in Sesame Neighborhood before being relocated to its current spot in 2024.

=== Sesame City ===
An area themed to mass transit and a big city.

Name	Manufacturer	Opened	Description
Oscar's Wacky Taxi	The Gravity Group	2018	A family hybrid wooden roller coaster featuring a crazy taxi ride with Oscar, it is located near the front gate.
Big Bird's Tour Bus	Zamperla	2022	A crazy bus ride themed to a tour around the city with Big Bird.

=== Big Bird's Beach ===
Formerly known as "Twiddlebug Land" from 1993 until 2023.

Name	Opened	Description
Elmo's Surf n' Slide	1995	A large raft water slide that stands more than six stories high. Formerly known as "Sky Splash" from 1995 until 2023.
Rosita's Seaside Slides	1993	Two spiral tube water slides. Single and double tubes are used. Formerly known as "Slimey's Chutes" from 1993 until 2023.
Little Bird's Bay	1993	A 10,000 sq ft (930 m^{2}) wave pool formed from Ernie's wild garden hose. Formerly known as "Teeny Tiny Tidal Wave Pool" from 1993 until 2023.
Abby's Splash n' Sprayground	1993	A kids play area with a giant watering can. This attraction was unnamed until 2023.

=== Sesame Island ===
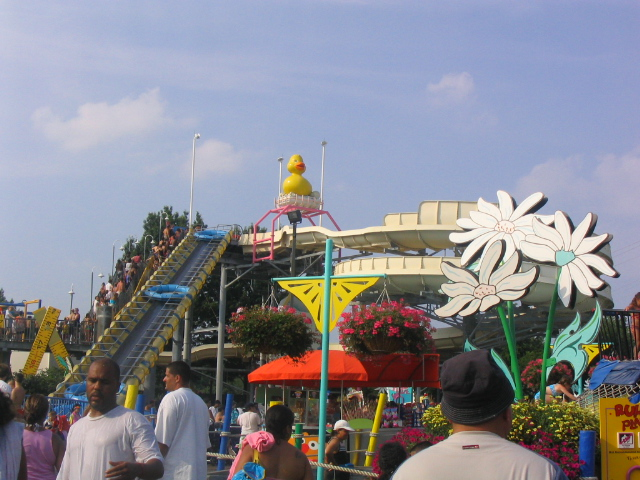
Sky Splash (a former attraction located in Twiddlebug Land) in 2005. This attraction is now known as "Elmo's Surf n' Slide".

An area featuring water-based attractions.

Name	Opened	Description
Abby's Paradise Theater		A covered outdoor theater that currently features Meet and Greets with Snuffy, and currently shows Welcome To The Party.
Bert and Ernie's Splashy Shores	2023	A water adventure area with water umbrellas, tipping buckets, spraying jets, water bobbles, and a spraying water tower.
Big Bird's Rambling River	1990	A slow-moving, 1,000 ft (300 m) waterway winding through Sesame Island.
Sand Castle Beach	1990	A giant beach-like sandbox and playground.

=== Sesame Neighborhood ===
A full-scale replica of Sesame Street. Opened in 1988.

Name	Opened	Description
123 Playground	2024	A colorful children's play area with classic playground elements. Its location was formerly the home of the Sunny Day Carousel prior to its relocation, as well as the classic Big Bird Steps.
Elmo’s Studio Theater	1980	(Sesame Studio until 2026) An indoor theater currently used for shows and other special events.
Sesame Street Theater	1980	A large outdoor theater that is currently used for special events, shows, and meet-and-greets.

=== The Count's Court ===
Themed after Count von Count and features water rides. The special Count-themed dry attractions only operate during special events and are listed below.

Name	Opened	Description
The Count's Splash Castle	2009	A multi-level, water park attraction features over 90 play elements, including a 1000-gallon tipping bucket.
Abby's Fairy Falls	1983	Four short vertical water slides that drop into a three-foot pool. (Formerly known as Slippery Slopes until Mid-July 2021).

=== Elmo's World ===
Themed after Elmo, more specifically the Elmo's World segment.

Name	Opened	Description
Elmo's Silly Splashy Slides	1985	Two intertwining body flumes that empty into a splash pool. (Formerly known as Bert & Ernie's Slip & Slide until Mid-July 2021)
Peek-A-Bug	2006	A Rock 'n Tug themed to a bug in a garden.
Blast Off	2006	A tower drop ride in which riders travel to Planet Elmo.
Elmo's Cloud Chaser	2011	Riders fly around in swings.
Flyin' Fish	2006	An aerial carousel ride, similar to Dumbo the Flying Elephant.
Snuffy's Slides	1980	Two long dry tube slides for children 12 and under. This is the last vestige of the Big Bird Bridge system.

=== Cookie's Monster Land ===
Named after Cookie Monster. Opened in 2014.

Name	Opened	Description
Captain Cookie's High C's Adventure	2014	Pirate ships circle a rising and falling track.
Oscar's Rusty Rotten Rockets	2014	A whip-like ride, but with hanging garbage can-shaped rockets as vehicles.
Honker Dinger Derby	2014	A Tivoli Orbiter. Formerly operated at Busch Gardens Tampa as Sandstorm.
Monster Mix-Up	2002	A teacup ride. Formerly known as Grover's World Twirl.
Flying Cookie Jars	2002	A 40 ft (12 m) high tower ride that affords a view of the park. Formerly known as Big Bird's Balloon Race.
Monster Clubhouse	2014	A net-climbing attraction.
Mini Monster Clubhouse	2014	A play area for smaller children.

=== Special Event Rides ===
These rides only operate during specific seasonal events.

Name	Description
The Castle Swing	A swing ride.
The Count's Fly By	A smaller version of Elmo's Cloud Chaser, themed after the Count.
The Count's Cruisers	A carousel-type attraction with 4x4 cars.

== Former attractions ==
Name	Opened	Closed	Description
Adult's Oasis	Unknown	Unknown	An area for adults.
The Amazing Mumford's Water Maze	1980	2004	A maze attraction consisting of tubes with water sprays. The spot where the attraction once stood is empty, being used as a simple pathway.
Anti-Gravity Mirror			Mirrors for children.
Balancing Buoys	1981	Circa 1982	
Bert's Balance Beams	1980	Unknown	Balance Beams.
Big Bird Bridge/Steps	1980	2007	The original park icon, consisting of a large Big Bird head and a long bridge, which led to various slides, although near the end of its life it only led to the tube slides. The bridge was removed in the late 90's and Big Bird's mouth was closed up, which left the steps for photo ops. The steps and head were fully removed in 2007 to make way for the Sunny Day Carousel.
Big Bird's Nest	1980	2013	A small play area featuring large padded grounds and blocks. Only children under 5 were permitted inside the attraction. It was removed to make way for Cookie's Monster Land.
Chat Lag			A place to chat.
Circle Theater	1983	Unknown	A theater that presented an animal show. The theater's building later became home to the 1, 2, 3, Smile with Me! Photo-op.
Circus Mirrors			Mirrors for children but circus themed.
The Computer Gallery/The Games Gallery	1980	2001	This attraction housed an area featuring many computers, allowing attendees to play simple educational games featuring Sesame Street characters. In 1993, the area became The Games Gallery, with arcade games replacing computers. In 2001, the attraction was converted into a quick-service restaurant, known as Sesame Cafe.
Cookie Mountain	1980	2013	An inflatable mountain where children could climb on their own. Only children under seven were permitted at this attraction. It was removed to make way for Cookie's Monster Land.
The Count Around	2015	2017-2018	A mini ferris wheel that appeared during The Count's Halloween Spooktacular. It has not returned into the park since 2017-2018, and is currently in storage.
The Count's Ballroom	1980	2006	A large ball pit containing over 80,000 balls. It was removed to make way for Elmo's World, with this attraction replaced with Blast Off.
The Count's Fount	1985	2008	A water play area. It was demolished to make way for the larger Count's Splash Castle.
Create a Muppet Show	1980's	Unknown	
Crystal Climb	1982	Unknown	A set of geodesic climbing mazes. It was soon relocated to another area, before being removed entirely and permanently. The original location later became home to Adult's Oasis, while the relocated version became home to the Sesame Slab Slides.
Elmo's World Live	2001	2016	A live show based on the segment of the same name. It was replaced with Elmo: the Musical – LIVE!.
Ernie's Bed Bounce	1980	2013	An inflatable, springy air mattress. For two years in 1981, a second mattress was also added in the spot where the Circle Theater later stood. The main bed was removed to make way for Cookie's Monster Land in 2013, with Honker Dinger Derby sitting where this once stood.
Ernie's Waterworks	1990	2022	A small water play area. Removed at the end of the 2022 season to be replaced by Bert and Ernie's Splashy Shores.
Everyone is You and Me	1983	1990's	Unknown
Foot Notes			Notes for people.
Grover's Rubber Band Bounce			A giant rubber band four feet wide and eight feet high which let kids "bounce off the walls."
Herry's Hand Over Water	1980	1984	A playground set over a pool of water. It was later replaced with the Sesame Construction Company attraction.
Kaliedoscope			
Little Bird's Birdbath	1990's	2008	A sprinkler play area made for young children. It was demolished alongside its sister attraction Little Bird's Rapids to make way for The Count's Splash Castle.
Little Bird's Court	1980	2001	A sand-focused playground. It was later moved to Sesame Island. The spot where the original version stood was replaced with Grover's World Twirl.
Little Bird's Rapids	Unknown	2008	A junior water slide. It was demolished alongside its sister attraction Little Bird's Birdbath to make way for The Count's Splash Castle.
Mirror Mirage			
Mix and Match Muppet Totem Poles			
Mix n' Match Twiddle Tracks	1993	2021	A children's railroad. Its trains were removed after the 2021 season.
Monster Maze	1980	2013	A small, sand bottom pit with large "monster" bags children can run around in. It was removed in 2013 to make way for Cookie's Monster Land.
Multiscopes			
Nets & Climbs	1980	2013	Hundreds of yards of cargo netting connected by 200 ft (61 m) of suspended net tunnels. It was removed in 2013 to make way for Cookie's Monster Land.
Oscar's Balance Beams			A set of balance beams.
Oscar's Obstacle Course	1980	Unknown	A twisty maze in a sand box.
Pedal Power and Cycles	1980	1999	
Pin Tables			
Pitch Switch			
Rainbow Pyramid	1980	2001	An attraction that taught children about air pressure. It was replaced with Sesame Playhouse.
Rainbow Room	1980	1999	
Rubber Duckie Pond	1980	Unknown	A giant water bed that kids could jump on. It was later redeveloped into a water play area under the same name.
Rubber Duckie Pond	Unknown	2010	A water play area that replaced the above water bed. It was demolished in 2010 to make way for Elmo's Cloud Chaser.
Runaway Rapids	1984	2008	A tube water slide. It was demolished to make way for The Count's Splash Castle.
Sesame Beach	1980	2006	A sandbox area. It was demolished in 2006 to make way for the Elmo's World area, with this attraction replaced with Peek a Bug.
Sesame Construction Company	1985	2001	A play area featuring giant building blocks that can be used to create structures. It was removed to make way for Big Bird's Balloon Race.
Sesame Dream Network			
Sesame Garden	1981	1980's	A flower garden.
Sesame Place Furry Express		2020	a locomotive train that appeared seasonally during A Very Furry Christmas and The Count's Halloween Spooktacular (as The Count's Guess Who Express). Has not returned to the park since the 2020 season.
Sesame Production Company			
Sesame Slab Slides			A set of slides that go from the top of the Nets & Climbs to the bottom.
Sesame Streak		2020–2022	A pair of tube water slides, one for single riders and the other for double riders. This water slide closed between 2020 and 2021 and remained standing but not operating until late 2022.
Shadow Room	1980	2001	
Silly Sand Slides	1993	2019	Three giant slides modeled after; A large watch, a spoon on a bag of marbles and a dumped bucket of sand. The attraction was removed in 2019.
Slimey's Square	2021	2023	A children's play area designated for children 5 and under.
Slippery Slopes	1980	1985	A set of foam-covered slides. It has no connection with the water slide Abby's Fairy Falls which formerly had the same name as this water slide. It was later replaced with Sesame Streak.
The Snake Tube	1981		
Snuffle Ball	1981		
Super Grover's Cable Glides	1980	1986	A set of rope swings.
Talking Picture Show			
Teleidoscope Temple	1980	1999	Hall of mirrors emulating a kaleidoscope.
Touch of Spring	1983	Unknown	
Tunnels of Fun	1980	2013	A set of tunnels. Removed in 2013 to make way for Cookie's Monster Land.
Twiddlebug Hop	1980	1986	A large rope swing. It was later replaced with a garden area.
Twiddlebug Land	1993	2022	A large themed area in the waterpark section to make yourself feel as small as a Twiddlebug. The land & attractions remained and were rethemed in 2023 to "Big Bird's Beach".
Twiddlebug Tunnel	1980	unknown	A tunnel for kids to crawl through where "mysterious colors and sounds await".
Whisper Walls	1980	2013	It was removed in 2013 to make way for Cookie's Monster Land.
Zoetrope			
Zoom Flume	1983	1986	A water slide. It was demolished in 1986 due to low capacity and the additions of other water attractions, with its spot being replaced with Little Bird's Birdbath.
