= SeaWorld Ohio =

Marine park in Aurora, Ohio

- Previously known as SeaWorld of Ohio; SeaWorld Cleveland
- Interactive map of SeaWorld Ohio
- Location: 1100 SeaWorld Drive, Aurora, Ohio, 44202
- Coordinates: 41.34839°N 81.36919°W
- Status: Defunct
- Opened: May 29, 1970; 56 years ago
- Closed: October 29, 2000; 25 years ago
- Owner: Busch Entertainment Corporation
- Operated by: Busch Entertainment Corporation
- Slogan: "The ocean is closer than you think!"
- Operating season: May–October
- Area: 232 acres (94 ha)

Attractions
- Total: 1
- Roller coasters: 0
- Water rides: 0

SeaWorld Ohio was a theme park and marine zoological park located in Aurora, Ohio. It was owned and operated by Busch Entertainment Corporation. The Ohio location was the second SeaWorld park to be built in the chain, following SeaWorld San Diego, which opened six years earlier. The park was developed by George Millay, founder of the SeaWorld brand. After being purchased by Six Flags, the park was merged with Six Flags Ohio, an adjacent amusement park, to create Six Flags Worlds of Adventure. Later, after the property was purchased by Cedar Fair, it was converted to a water park known as Wildwater Kingdom, which occupied the property until its closure in September 2016.

== History ==
=== SeaWorld Cleveland (1970–2000) ===
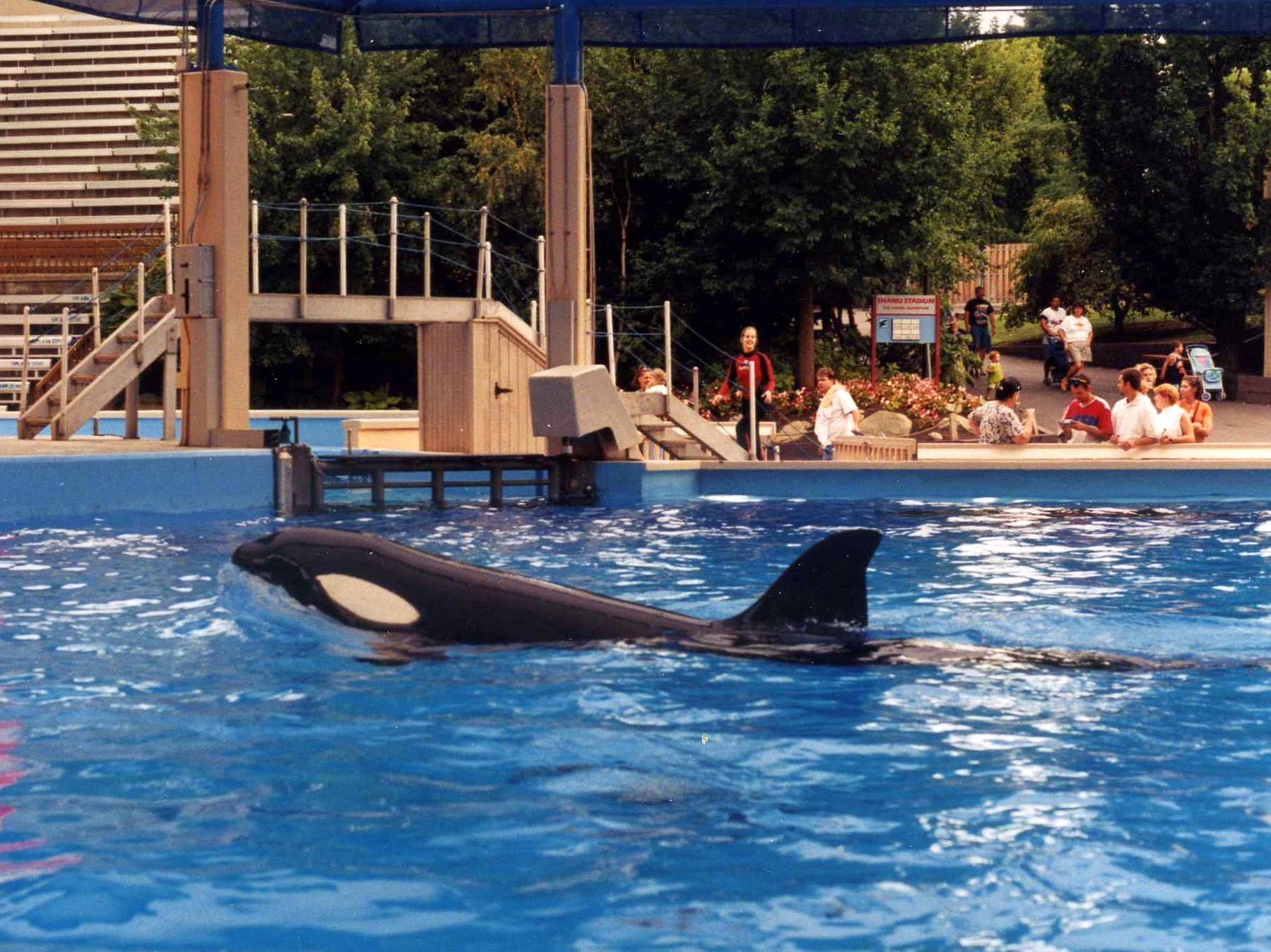
Shamu show at SeaWorld Ohio in 1999

In 1966, Earl Gascoigne, marketing director at Cedar Point in Sandusky, Ohio, was impressed by the success of SeaWorld San Diego and eager to form a partnership with the park's founder, George Millay. Gascoigne spoke with Millay about building a second park near the Ohio amusement park. Millay was uncomfortable with the location and sales agreement, and declined to build there. Two years later, Millay and his team were looking to expand their brand eastward. The company was looking for a location between Detroit and Pittsburgh, as the land spanning between the two cities was the largest and highest-paid blue-collar population in the United States.

Earl Gascoigne had recently left Cedar Point to redevelop Geauga Lake, a struggling amusement park near Cleveland, with Gasper Lococo. The men were searching for a way to increase attendance and revenue at Geauga Lake in ways other than adding new attractions. Gascoigne took the opportunity to reconnect with Millay. Now working with Funtime Inc., Gascoigne convinced Millay to build the second SeaWorld park adjacent to Geauga Lake. The Ohio SeaWorld project was announced in 1968.

SeaWorld Cleveland, originally referred to as Sea World of Ohio, opened to the public on May 29, 1970, after nearly two years of planning and construction. Located approximately 30 miles southeast of Cleveland, in the Western Reserve city of Aurora, Ohio, the 25-acre marine park had over 5,500 guests on its opening day. The oceanarium cost $5.5 million to build, but greatly exceeded the expectations of Millay and his team. In its first 100-day season, SeaWorld Cleveland doubled attendance predictions, as more than 1.1 million people visited the park in 1970.

The marine park was well-landscaped, and won several awards. By the year 2000, SeaWorld Cleveland, now known as SeaWorld Ohio, had grown to occupy 232 acres, but was restricted from adding roller coasters or water rides due to a non-compete clause with neighboring Geauga Lake.

=== Six Flags Worlds of Adventure (2001–2003) ===
Six Flags announced that it had reached an agreement to purchase SeaWorld Ohio from Busch Entertainment Corporation on January 10, 2001, for $110 million. Six Flags combined the marine life park with the 520-acre Six Flags Ohio (formerly Geauga Lake), along with their nearby campground and hotel properties.

Beginning in 2001, the combined parks were renamed Six Flags Worlds of Adventure, covering 750 acres of land. The property was divided into three sections—Wild Life, the former SeaWorld park; Wild Rides, formerly Geauga Lake; and Wild Slides, a 10-acre water park—all included in a single gate price. The sale of SeaWorld Ohio did not include the park's orcas and dolphins. The orca show was replaced by three dolphins from Six Flags Discovery Kingdom until a new orca, Shouka, arrived on loan from a park in France. Along with new animal exhibits, Six Flags added two family rides and a Batman-themed water ski show. Six Flags president Gary Story announced that a five-year plan for the Ohio park included submarine, volcano, and rain forest attractions, as well as a monorail system for transportation.

Six Flags Ohio reported record attendance in 2000, reaching 1.7 million guests. After joining the parks as Worlds of Adventure in 2001, attendance jumped to 2.7 million visitors, but shy of the anticipated 3 million by park officials.

=== Geauga Lake & Wildwater Kingdom (2005–2007) ===
On March 10, 2004, Cedar Fair, the owner and operator of Cedar Point in Sandusky, Ohio, announced that they would be acquiring Six Flags Worlds of Adventure. Cedar Fair purchased all 750 acres for $145 million, while Six Flags retained ownership of the park's animals. Six Flags stated that the sale of the Ohio property would allow them to pay down debt and pursue other opportunities in North America.

Beginning in 2004, the park opened without the animal attractions, and much of the former SeaWorld property was restricted from guest access. Cedar Fair had reinstituted the park's original Geauga Lake name for the 2004 season. Along with the removal of the animals and demolition of animal attractions, Cedar Fair stripped the park of all Six Flags branding, including DC Comics and Looney Tunes theming, as licensing rights were not included in the sale.

On June 17, 2005, a new waterpark named Wildwater Kingdom opened on 17 acres of the former SeaWorld Cleveland site. The addition of the waterpark saw the property being renamed Geauga Lake & Wildwater Kingdom for the 2005 season onward. A second phase to the waterpark was planned for 2006, including a wave pool, body slides, whirl pool, and swim-up bar, totaling $24 million for the two-year project and covering 20 acres. However, the expansion was scaled back; ultimately only a 30,000-square-foot wave pool was added in 2006 at the cost of $5 million. The addition of Wildwater Kingdom was an attempt by Cedar Fair to offset the loss of animal attractions. Many of the structures in the marine life section of the park were demolished or refurbished to complement the new waterpark.

Attendance at Geauga Lake under Cedar Fair ownership dropped 74 percent from 2.7 million in 2001 to 700,000 in 2004. Attendance remained at 700,000 through the 2006 season. After the 2006 season, Cedar Fair removed three attractions, including the X-Flight and Steel Venom roller coasters, and the Bel-Aire Express monorail, as well as shortening the operating season to 101 days and discontinuing Halloween events.

=== Wildwater Kingdom (2008–2016) ===
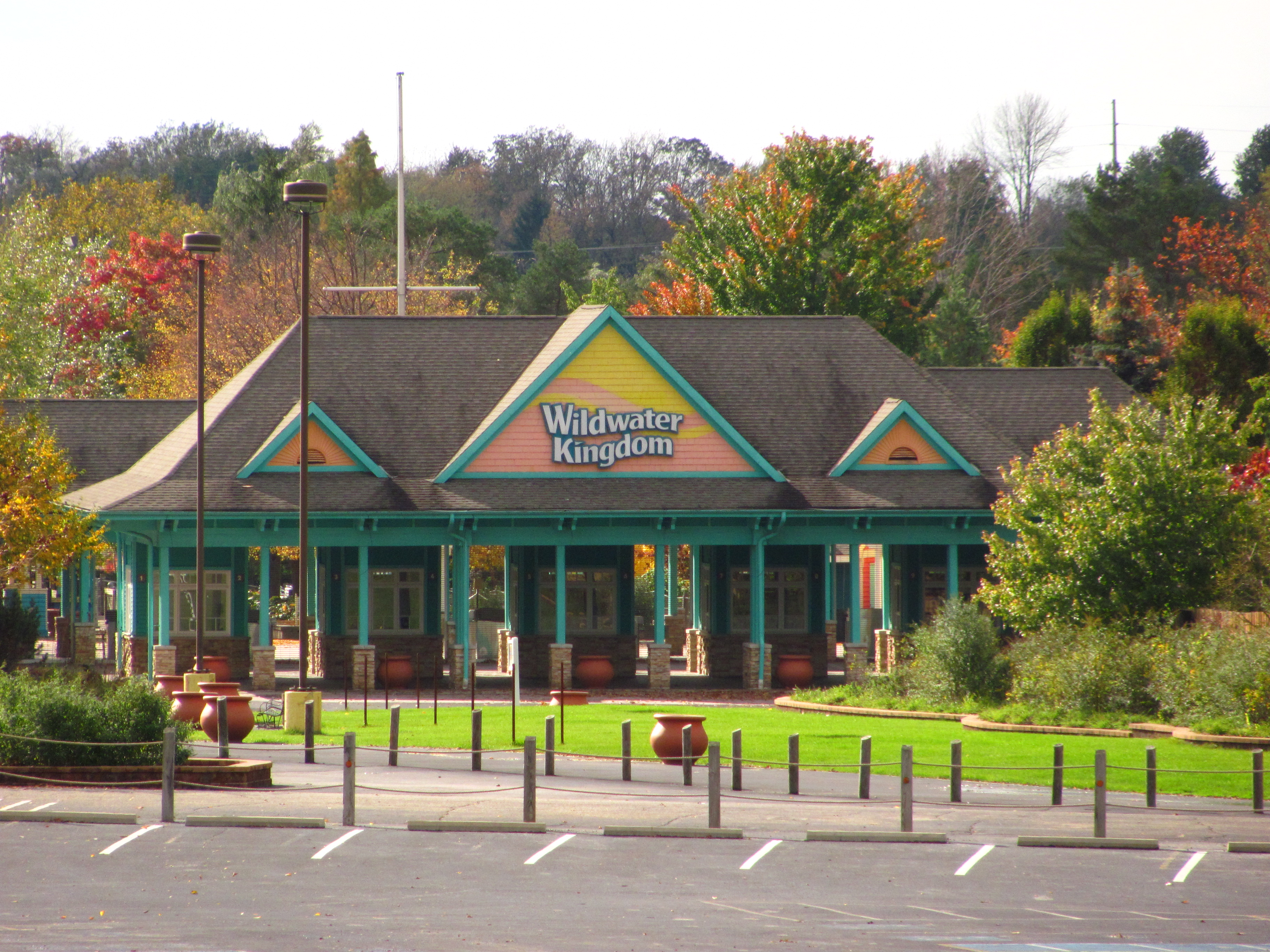
The Wildwater Kingdom entrance as it appeared after 2008.

On September 21, 2007, Cedar Fair announced in a press release that the Geauga Lake & Wildwater Kingdom would become exclusively a waterpark for the 2008 season. Dick Kinzel, president and chief executive officer of Cedar Fair at the time, stated that Wildwater Kingdom was the attraction's most popular attribute. The company reported that the stand-alone waterpark was a better fit for the area and that they hoped to draw a more local crowd.

Cedar Fair announced on August 19, 2016, that Wildwater Kingdom would not reopen for the 2017 season. The waterpark closed permanently on September 5, 2016, after eleven years in business. Demolition occurred in November 2017. In August 2020, ground was broken on the site for a mixed-use development featuring 308 residential units, 20 acres of commercial space, and 98 acres of park land.

== Attractions ==
SeaWorld Ohio had various attractions, including rides, exhibits, and live shows.

=== Rides and attractions ===
When SeaWorld acquired the Aurora property in 1970, the company agreed to a competitive restriction with Geauga Lake, which prevented them from adding roller coasters or water rides. Honoring the no-compete clause, Geauga Lake was restricted from adding animal attractions, while SeaWorld was limited to theaters and motion-based attractions. Instead of rides, there were several different playgrounds located within the park.

Name	Opened	Closed	Description
Mission: Bermuda Triangle	2000	2003	A motion-based simulator ride that displayed undersea footage and special effects. The attraction was situated in a 12,000 square foot Quonset hut, containing four submarine style simulators giving guests the thrill of traveling underwater in the Bermuda Triangle. Mission: Bermuda Triangle was the largest capital investment made at the Ohio park, and the only ride added under SeaWorld ownership.
Pirates 4-D	1997	2003	A 4-D film first shown at SeaWorld Cleveland, featuring Leslie Nielsen and Eric Idle.
Shamu's Happy Harbor	1992	2007	A three-story net climbing structure and pirate ship playground. After the park was acquired by Six Flags in 2001, the attraction was renamed Happy Harbor.
Cap'n Kids' World	1975	1991	Large pirate ship playground and ball pit. Portions of this attraction were retained for Shamu's Happy Harbor.
Dancing Waters	1971	Unknown	

=== Exhibits ===
The marine life park included many animal and cultural exhibits.

Name	Opened	Closed	Description
Carnivore Park	1998	1999	An attraction featuring animatronic dinosaurs.
Patagonia Passage	1996	2003	A habitat featuring Commerson's dolphins and Magellanic penguins.
Dolphin Cove	1995	2003	Dolphin Cove allowed guests to view, touch, and feed dolphins.
Shark Encounter	1993	2003	An exhibit where guests took a moving sidewalk through a shark tunnel and could view various sharks and fish.
Monster Marsh	1992	1993	
Penguin Encounter	1985	2003	Guests could view dozens of penguins on snow-covered rocks and in water.
Sea Lion and Seal Community Pool	1982	2003	An outdoor pool and rock enclosure where guests could feed seals and sea lions.
World of the Sea Aquarium	1973	2003	The Ohio Triquarium held many species of colorful fish, as well as see-and-touch tide pools.
Alligator Exhibit	1971	1990s	A small pen with 3 alligators and an overlook bridge for guests.
Japanese Deer Park	1971	1984	An attraction that included fallow and sika deer, which guests could pet and feed.
Hawaiian Punch Village	1971		A Polynesian-themed area that served drinks to visitors.
Seal Pool	1970	1981	A small set of pools where guests could feed seals. Replaced by the larger Sea Lion and Seal Community Pool.
Trout Fishing Pond	1970		A small freshwater pond stocked with Rainbow Trout where guests could cast a line and catch a fish.
Dolphin Pool	1970	1994	A small set of pools for guest to pet and feed Bottlenose dolphins.
Japanese Village	1970	2003	Costumed Amas dove for oysters which provided pearls for jewelry sold within the park. Thousands of Koi filled the ponds in the village. The area was also decorated with cultural Japanese artifacts.

=== Dining ===
SeaWorld Ohio offered a variety of shopping and dining options. Gift shops within the park held many pieces of merchandise. Food locations served various types of meals. The park also featured Polynesian dining, and several smaller snack stands.

== Venues ==
Several stadiums, theaters, and event pavilions made up the 50-acre theme park.

Name	Type	Opened	Closed	Description	Notable shows
Great Lakes Catering Reserve	Open-air	Unknown	2003	Four catering pavilions with food service.	N/A
Harbor Theater	Enclosed	1997	2007	Large 4-D theater constructed for the 1997 season.	Pirates 4-D
Lakeside Pavilion	Open-air	Unknown	2003	Event pavilion located on the shore of Geauga Lake.	N/A
Nautilus Theater (Olympic Theater)	Open-air	1977	2003	Large, rectangular-shaped, stadium.	The Canadian Lumberjack Show; Olympic Spirit; All Star Mutts
Reserved Picnic Pavilions	Open-air	1971	Unknown	Several pavilions catered to group outings and picnics	N/A
Sea Lion and Otter Stadium	Open-air	1970	2003	3,000 seat, seashell-shaped, stadium situated on a hill, allowing upper and lower access. Opened with the park in 1970 as Sea Lion and Penguin Stadium.	Clyde & Seamore 1000BC; Clyde & Seamore Return to BC; Sea Lions Of The Silver Screen; Clyde & Seamore's Spooky Kastle
Shamu Stadium	Open-air	1970	2003	4,000 seat, seashell-shaped, stadium situated on a hill, allowing upper and lower access. Opened with the park in 1970.	Shamu Goes Hollywood; Shamu for Mayor; Shamu the Yankee Doodle Whale; Shamu Goes to College; Showboat '80; This is Shamu; Shamu, Take a Bow; Shamu Celebration; Shamu 25th Anniversary; Baby Shamu Celebration; Shamu New Visions; Shamu: World Focus; Shamu's Night Magic
Ski Stadium (Baywatch Stadium)	Open-air	1971	2008	3,500 seat lakefront stadium on the shore of Geauga Lake. The Ohio park was the first in the SeaWorld chain to feature a water ski show and stadium. Due to extreme popularity, the stadium was expanded a few years after opening.	Tommy Bartlett Ski Show; Superheroes Ski Show; Baywatch Ski Show; Mermaids, Myths, and Monsters; Intensity Games Water Ski Spectacular
Woods Arena	Open-air	1988	2003	Large, rectangular-shaped, stadium. The stadium remained standing until 2014, when it was demolished.	Wild Wings Bird Show; Lumberjack Show

== Incidents ==
An 18-foot motorboat wrecked into the ski stadium audience of 4,000 people on August 17, 1996, injuring 22 people. Those injured aged from 2 to 78, and four were left in critical condition from the crash. The boat was a part of the Baywatch Ski Show and crashed due to a mechanical failure.
