= Sesame Place San Diego =

Theme park and water park in California

- Previously known as Whitewater Canyon (1997–2000); Knott's Soak City U.S.A.- San Diego (2000–2013); Aquatica San Diego (2013–2021)
- Interactive map of Sesame Place San Diego
- Location: Chula Vista, San Diego County, California, United States
- Coordinates: 32.5884°N 117.0101°W
- Status: Operating
- Opened: May 31, 1997; 29 years ago (as Whitewater Canyon); May 27, 2000; 26 years ago (as Knott's Soak City U.S.A. – San Diego); June 1, 2013; 13 years ago (as Aquatica San Diego); March 26, 2022; 4 years ago (as Sesame Place San Diego)
- Owner: United Parks & Resorts
- Operated by: United Parks & Resorts
- General manager: Jim Lake (president)
- Theme: Sesame Street
- Slogan: Go Before They Grow
- Operating season: Year-round (currently planned)
- Area: 17 acres (6.9 ha)

Attractions
- Total: 18 (as of April 8, 2022)
- Roller coasters: 1 (as of April 8, 2022)
- Water rides: 10 (as of April 8, 2022)
- Other rides: 8 (as of April 8, 2022)
- Shows: Numerous throughout the day and a parade daily with all the characters.
- Website: Sesame Place San Diego Home Page

Sesame Place San Diego is a children's theme park and water park in Chula Vista, California. It is owned and operated by United Parks & Resorts, which operates the park under an exclusive license from Sesame Workshop, the nonprofit owner of Sesame Street.

It is a certified autism center by the International Board of Credentialing and Continuing Education Standards (IBCCES). Its sister park, Sesame Place Philadelphia in Langhorne, Pennsylvania, was the first theme park in the world to be a certified autism center.

== History ==
=== As a water park ===
Sesame Place San Diego originally opened on May 31, 1997, as White Water Canyon, being operated independently. At the time it featured 16 water slides and a wave pool, with a western theme applied to it. The park suffered from many management and construction problems, and the poor attendance led to the park filing for Chapter 11 Bankruptcy in June 1998.

In December 1999, Cedar Fair purchased the park from its original owners for $11.5 million. Under its new ownership, Cedar Fair gave the park a new beach-theme and a rename to Knott's Soak City U.S.A. for its reopening on May 27, 2000.

On November 20, 2012, Cedar Fair announced it had sold the park to SeaWorld Parks & Entertainment. The acquisition saw the park transformed into a 32-acre (13 ha) water park named Aquatica San Diego. The refurbished park reopened on June 1, 2013. It featured a wide array of attractions for all ages and swimming abilities, one of which passes by a flamingo habitat. The water park was featured on the episode, "Appalachian Splashin" on Xtreme Waterparks.

=== As Sesame Place San Diego ===
In 2017, Sesame Workshop announced that a new Sesame Place park would open "no later than" mid-2021. The location of the new park was soon revealed in 2019 when SeaWorld announced that Aquatica San Diego would be re-branded as Sesame Place San Diego park for the 2021 season. The Sesame Street-themed park would feature tame roller coasters, carousels and other family-friendly rides, the street made famous on TV, a parade, live shows, character interactions, and other attractions. The park retained the Aquatica water attractions into the new park, although one of the rides, "HooRoo Run", was removed for being deemed too extreme for the retheming.

Construction took place in phases, allowing Aquatica to remain open for the time period. The park's opening was soon delayed to 2022, due to the COVID-19 pandemic halting construction. Aquatica soon closed for its final season on September 12, 2021, and the remains of the park were transformed into Sesame Place San Diego.

In November 2021, it was confirmed that the newly themed park would open in March 2022. The park opened on the 26th of that month.

== Attractions ==
As the park was originally a water park, Sesame Place San Diego contains mostly water attractions, but with its retheming, several dry attractions are included as well.

| Name | Opened | Description | Manufacturer |
|---|---|---|---|
| Abby's Fairy Flight | 2022 | A Chairswing Ride. | Zamperla |
| Cookie Climb | 2022 | Two mini climbing towers, one Cookie Monster themed, the other is Cookie themed. The guest pulls themselves up in a chair and the ride drops the chair slowly. | Sunkid |
| Elmo's Rockin' Rockets | 2022 | An Aerial-Carousel Ride. | Zamperla |
| Rosita's Harmony Hills | 2022 | A play area. | |
| Rub-A-Dub Sub | 2022 | A Crazy Bus ride themed after a Submarine. | Zamperla |
| Sesame Street Soar and Spin | 2022 | A Samba Balloon ride. | Zamperla |
| Sunny Day Carousel | 2022 | A Carousel. | Chance Rides |
| Super Grover's Box Car Derby | 2022 | A family roller coaster themed to Sesame Street's Grover character. | Zierer |

In addition to the rides, a replica of Sesame Street called "Sesame Street Neighborhood" is also featured, alongside photo ops with many Sesame Street characters.

=== Water attractions ===
| Name | Opened | Description | Former names |
|---|---|---|---|
| Bert's Topsy Turvy Tunnels | TBC | Three 60-foot-tall double-inner-tube slides. Two enclosed and one open air. | Kiwi Curl (Aquatica); Palisades Plunge (Soak City) |
| Big Bird's Beach | 1997 | A 550,000-gallon wave pool. | Big Surf Shores (Aquatica); Balboa Bay (Soak City) |
| Big Bird's Rambling River | 1997 | A 1250-foot-long lazy river | Loggerhead Lane (Aquatica); Sunset River (Soak City) |
| Cookie's Monster Mixer | 2005 | A 75-foot-tall ProSlide Tornado water slide that drops 60 feet (23 m) into a large six-story funnel. | Tassie's Twister (Aquatica); Pacific Spin (Soak City) |
| Elmo's Silly Sand Slides | 1997 | A play area designed for children featuring smaller slides. | Slippity Dippity (Aquatica); Tykes Trough (Soak City) |
| Ernie's Twisty Turny Tunnels | 1997 | Three 60-foot-tall, single-inner-tube slides. Two enclosed and one open air. | Woohoo Falls (Aquatica); Solana Storm Watch Tower (Soak City) |
| Honker Dinger Dash | 2014 | A six-lane racing slide with guests sliding down on mats through enclosed and open sections. | Taumata Racer (Aquatica) |
| Oscar's Rotten Rafts | 2000 | A 78-foot-tall four-person family raft water slide. | Walhalla Wave (Aquatica); Coronado Express (Soak City) |
| Snuffy's Spaghetti Slides | 1997 | A 60-foot-tall water slide complex with six body slides, four enclosed and two open air. | Whanau Way (Aquatica); Imperial Run (Soak City) |
| The Count's Splash Castle | 2023 | A ProSlide RideHOUSE. It replaced the previous The Count's Splash Castle. The new structure is a multi-level, interactive water-play attraction that features 4 water slides, 111 play elements, including three giant tipping buckets that dump over 1,300 gallons of water combined. | |

=== Former attractions ===
| Name | Opened | Removed | Description | Former names |
|---|---|---|---|---|
| The Count's Splash Castle | 1997 | 2023 | A four-story interactive, area that features two slides, hoses, jets, geysers, and a 500-gallon bucket that unloads every five minutes. The attraction was removed for the 2023 season, and was replaced with a larger version. | Walkabout Waters and Kata's Kookaburra Cove (Aquatica); Dick's Beach House and Gremmie Lagoon (Soak City) |
| HooRoo Run | 1997 | 2019 | An 80-foot-tall speed slide with two open-air and two enclosed slides. It was removed after the 2019 season, as the slide's drop and speed were deemed too extreme for the Sesame Place retheming. The ride also suffered from maintenance issues and frequent downtime during Aquatica’s last several seasons. | La Jolla Falls (Soak City) |
