= Adventure Island (water park) =

Water park near Tampa, Florida, United States

- Interactive map of Adventure Island
- Location: Tampa, Florida, United States
- Coordinates: 28°2′30″N 82°24′47″W
- Owner: United Parks & Resorts
- Opened: June 7, 1980; 46 years ago
- Area: 30 acres (12 ha)
- Pools: 2 pools
- Water slides: 10 water slides
- Children's areas: 3 children's areas
- Website: www.adventureisland.com

Adventure Island is a water park located northeast of Tampa, Florida, across the street from Busch Gardens Tampa Bay. The park features 30 acres (12 ha) of water rides, dining, and other attractions. The park opened on June 7, 1980, and is part of United Parks & Resorts.

== Rides ==
- Aruba Tuba
- Calypso Coaster
- Caribbean Corkscrew
- Colossal Curl
- Rapids Racer — ProSlide dueling racer with the world’s first dueling saucer section.
- Riptide (4 individual slides)
- Solar Vortex
- Vanish Point (3 individual slides: 2 trap door slides and 1 non-trap door slide)
- Wahoo Remix, formerly Wahoo Run. The previous ProSlide Mammoth River with dark enclosed tunnels is now lit with multi-color LED lights and augmented with sound.
- Water Moccasin (3 enclosed tube slides)

== Pools ==
- Endless Surf
- Fabian's Fun Port
- Paradise Lagoon
- Rambling Bayou
- Splash Attack

== Defunct rides ==
- Tampa Typhoon: A water slide that closed in 2005. The slide opened in the late 1980s and shared a tower with Gulf Scream, a now-defunct water slide. Standing nearly 70 feet (21 m), or seven stories tall, the ride allowed patrons to see for miles around, including a view of the nearby MOSI museum.
- Gulf Scream: Built in 1980, it was the second ride to be constructed in the park. It shared its tower with (now defunct) Tampa Typhoon until 2005. It was demolished in 2014 to make way for the Park's newest ride Colossal Curl, a raft slide that opened in 2015.
- Barratuba: Built in the mid-1980s. This ride was a similar experience to Calypso Coaster (using a tube to ride on) but instead was built in-ground and followed the land's natural terrain down a hill. The ride finished with a short drop through a large cylinder before ending in a splash pool located immediately adjacent to the splash pool of the defunct Runaway Rapids, approximately where the park's most eastern snack and concession stand is now located. Guests can still observe the remnants of this ride now disguised as flower bed decoration lining the exit path of Wahoo Remix. The exact details of this ride's fate are unclear, but many Tampa natives who are old enough to remember Barratuba and the lore behind it, believe it was closed after a lawsuit was filed after a patron broke a bone while riding. As stated above the ride was built in-ground: and this created a very haphazard unpredictable experience which often created enough force to eject riders from their tubes.
- Everglides: A unique water slide that sent riders down a pair of straight fiberglass flumes from a wooden tower riding flat bottomed plastic toboggans. At the bottom of the slide, the fast-moving toboggans would carry the riders on a series of skipping bounces along the length of the splash pool before coming to rest at a beach. A mechanical conveyor carried the toboggans back to the top of the ride for the next guests. It was removed in between the 2017 and 2018 seasons to make way for a beach and sitting area.
- Key West Rapids: A 700-foot-long one-or-two-person water slide. Riders, seated on tubes, were sent down a course that includes pools, water mines, and three acres of water, which slowed the tubes to a near halt so that staffers could redirect the tubes down the remainder of the course. On September 10, 2011, a lifeguard working at the attraction was struck by lightning whilst wading in a pool and later died. In 2017, the park announced that Key West Rapids would be closing in 2019. It was replaced by Solar Vortex in 2020.
- Runaway Rapids: One of the park's first attractions, it consisted of five body slides winding through a rockwork structure. Two of them (Little Squirt and Corkscrew Canal) were tailored towards kids, while the other three (The River of No Return, Barracuda Run and Courageous Falls) were intended for adults. The attractions did not operate during the 2020 season and had faced limited operations in the years prior. In February 2021, demolition permits were filed with the City of Tampa to remove the attraction and the rockwork around it. and replaced by Rapids Racer.
- Hydra Tubes: Hydra Tubes were 2 drop pink body slides that went into Paradise Lagoon. It dropped into 10 feet of water. Riders had to be 42 inches tall to ride Hydra Tubes. It was removed in the 2017 season and never got replaced by a new water slide.

== Dining ==
- Surfside Cafe
- Mango Joe's
- Surfside Ice Cream
- Colossal Snacks
- Bayou Beach Club
- Island Taco Truck
- Snack Attack
