= United Parks & Resorts =

American entertainment company

United Parks & Resorts Inc.
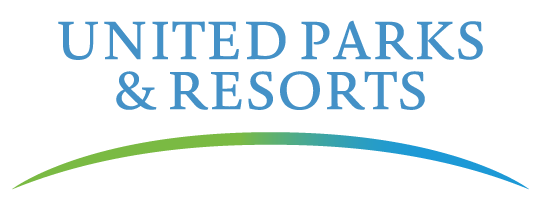
- Formerly: Busch Gardens (1959‍–‍1979); Busch Entertainment Corporation (1979‍–‍2009); SeaWorld Parks & Entertainment (2009‍–‍2013); SeaWorld Entertainment Inc. (2013‍–‍2024)
- Type: Public
- Traded as: NYSE: PRKS; Russell 2000 component; S&P 600 component
- Industry: Entertainment
- Founded: February 19, 1959; 67 years ago
- Headquarters: Orlando, Florida, United States
- Key people: Marc G. Swanson (CEO)
- Brands: Adventure Island; Aquatica; Busch Gardens; Discovery Cove; SeaWorld; Sesame Place; Water Country USA; Worlds of Discovery
- Revenue: ▼US$1.66 billion (2025)
- Operating income: ▼US$0.36 billion (2025)
- Net income: ▼US$0.17 billion (2025)
- Total assets: ▲US$2.62 billion (2025)
- Total equity: ▼US$–0.43 billion (2025)
- Owner: Hill Path Capital LP (49.4%)
- Number of employees: 16,700 (2024)
- Website: unitedparks.com
- Footnotes; 2025 Financials 2024 Annual Report

United Parks & Resorts Inc. (formerly known as SeaWorld Entertainment, SeaWorld Parks & Entertainment, and Busch Entertainment Corporation or just simply SeaWorld) is an American entertainment company headquartered in Orlando, Florida. The company owns and operates 12 recreational destinations in the United States, including eight theme parks and four water parks. Notable brands within its portfolio include SeaWorld and Busch Gardens. In 2024, United Parks & Resorts properties hosted 22.9 million guests, ranking it as the eighth-highest in attendance among amusement parks.

== History ==
=== SeaWorld: Founding and growth under Harcourt Brace (1964–89) ===
SeaWorld was founded by four UCLA graduates in 1964, and was a success from the start. The attraction in San Diego was conceived as a marine zoological park featuring sea life including dolphins and sea lions. In 1965 the first orca whale was added to the park, Shamu. Shamu was captured from the wild in an expedition off Puget Sound, after killing her mother with a harpoon. She was originally intended for the Seattle Marine Aquarium, but a deal was soon reached to transfer her to the new SeaWorld. She is believed to be the first healthy orca captured from the wild.

SeaWorld made an initial public offering of stock in 1968 to fund expansion. In 1970 a second park was opened in Aurora, Ohio, and in 1973 the third was added in Orlando. In 1976 the company was acquired by Harcourt Brace Jovanovich, Inc., a company previously engaged in publishing and insurance. In 1988 the new ownership opened an ambitious new SeaWorld in San Antonio, the largest marine park in the world, but by 1989 they were in financial difficulties and forced to seek a buyer for the parks.

=== Beginnings of Busch Entertainment Corporation (1979–89) ===
The Anheuser-Busch brewery, founded 1852, first expanded into entertainment destinations in 1959, opening the first Busch Gardens in Tampa, Florida, which was a combination of a traditional beer garden and an aviary. A second location was added in Los Angeles in 1963, though it was short-lived.

A third beer garden was added in Williamsburg in 1975, with a colonial theme. These beer gardens evolved into more general amusement attractions over time, and were seen by the company as a way to promote their brands. In 1979 the Busch Gardens division was incorporated as a subsidiary, Busch Entertainment Corporation, to support its further growth. The following year the first water park was opened next to the Tampa Busch Gardens, the Adventure Island Water Park, and Sesame Place was developed in Langhorne, Pennsylvania, jointly planned with the Children's Television Workshop. A second Sesame Place was opened in Irving, Texas, in June 1982 only to close a few years later in 1984.

=== SeaWorld joins Busch and further expansion (1989–2008) ===
In September 1989, Busch Entertainment purchased Harcourt Brace Jovanovich Park Group following their parent company's financial difficulties, which included Boardwalk and Baseball, Cypress Gardens and the SeaWorld parks. The unprofitable Boardwalk and Baseball theme park was quickly closed and the Baseball City Stadium was sold off. Busch acquired a tenth park, Water Country USA in 1992, which was near its existing Williamsburg location. In 1993, the company hit its record high attendance for all its parks with over 19 million people at Tampa Busch Gardens.

In 1995, Cypress Gardens was sold to the park's management. Busch Entertainment was a minority partner in Port Aventura, opened 1995 in Catalonia, Spain. The company launched a successful loyalty program called the Florida Fun Card season pass in 2000. The company credited this program, targeting local customers, for allowing them to stay afloat during the economic downturn that started after 9/11.

In 1999 plans were put in motion to transform Busch Gardens Tampa into a fully integrated resort, but they never came to fruition. In early 2001, the company sold the Aurora SeaWorld to Six Flags, while their first reservations-only park, Discovery Cove, opened next to Orlando SeaWorld. Beginning November 9, 2007, the parks collectively became known as Worlds of Discovery. Prior to the introduction of the Worlds of Discovery brand, the parks were marketed as Anheuser-Busch Adventure Parks. A new price plan came along with the new name, where purchasing tickets to multiple parks would get a discount. Sesame Street Bay of Play opened in 2008 at SeaWorld San Diego.

In February 2008 the company signed a licensing and management deal for a four-park development with Nakheel Properties, an arm of the Dubai government. Worlds of Discovery was planned to open there in 2012, but the plans were suspended indefinitely at the onset of the Great Recession.

=== InBev acquisition and spinoff as SeaWorld Parks & Entertainment (2008–2012) ===
In 2008, Anheuser-Busch was acquired by Belgian brewer InBev. Based on its previous acquisitions, it was widely expected that InBev would later sell off non-core assets in order to pay down the debt created by its purchase of Anheuser-Busch; the theme-park division was considered one of the most likely assets to be sold. In early 2009, InBev began soliciting bids for those assets in advance of an anticipated sale. As part of the plans to shed the division, Busch Entertainment ended the free beer-sampling programs at ten theme parks which have Anheuser-Busch BrewMaster's Clubs, and terminated a benefit where employees of legal age received two cases of Anheuser-Busch beer per month.

Former logo as SeaWorld Parks & Entertainment.

In late 2009, the Blackstone Group entered into negotiations to acquire Busch Entertainment. The Blackstone Group already owned a partnership in Universal Orlando Resort, and a significant interest in Merlin Entertainments, which operates attractions and theme parks such as Madame Tussauds and Legoland. On October 7, 2009, the discussions came to fruition as Anheuser-Busch InBev announced plans to sell Busch Entertainment Corporation to the Blackstone Group in a deal worth approximately US$2.7 billion. As part of the deal, Blackstone maintained the management from Busch Entertainment and operated it as a separate entity - now known as SeaWorld Parks & Entertainment. Anheuser-Busch would sign a sponsorship agreement with the company, allowing the two Busch Gardens parks to keep their names and promotions, including the "Here's to the Heroes" military appreciation program. The largest proposed change to the operation of the parks would be the removal of Anheuser-Busch's Clydesdales from those parks that had them and the removal of Anheuser-Busch logos.

Blackstone Group began pushing SeaWorld Parks & Entertainment into other areas including TV and animation divisions, expanding its consumer products unit and developing usage for its park film footage. In mid-2011, the company started the SeaWorld Pictures division with Scott Helmstedter as chief creative officer. The division's first release was Turtle: The Incredible Journey in June 2011. SeaWorld Entertainment agreed in January 2012 to a multi-year licensing deal with Ruckus Media, a Connecticut-based app developer, for SeaWorld's animal-based digital story books for ages three to eight. Sleepy Giant Entertainment and SeaWorld Parks released Turtle Trek, its first free mobile app based on the ride of the same name. SeaWorld and Nelvana Enterprises agreed in December 2012 to include Franklin and Friends with the SeaWorld Kids brand. Two special and co-branded books were planned.

=== SeaWorld Entertainment IPO, Blackfish, and c-suite turmoil (2013–2023) ===
At the close of 2012, SeaWorld Parks & Entertainment announced that it had filed for an initial public offering of stock, while changing its name to SeaWorld Entertainment. Part of the proceeds from this sale would go to Blackstone Group, which would retain a controlling interest in the company. It began trading April 19, 2013, on the New York Stock Exchange with a ticker symbol of SEAS.

In July 2013, CNN Films released the documentary Blackfish, which interviewed several former trainers, criticized the company's handling of killer whales, and revealed a long history of incidents in which orcas harmed trainers, which had been concealed both from the public and staff. It also chronicled three deaths involving Tilikum, the male orca at the heart of SeaWorld's breeding program.

SeaWorld's profits went into a steep decline and its share values plummeted. SeaWorld said in August 2014 that the film had hurt revenues at its San Diego, California park. That summer, SeaWorld, created a number of public relations websites such as Awesome Ocean, Stand With Sea World, and I Love SeaWorld, in an effort to share their view, counter what they believed were inaccuracies happening in the public debate, and repair their brand. On December 11, 2014, SeaWorld announced that chief executive Jim Atchison would resign, with an interim successor replacing him on January 15, 2015. The company's share price had fallen 44% in 2014.

In March 2014, California State Assemblyman Richard Bloom introduced the Orca Welfare and Safety Act, a bill in California that would ban entertainment-driven orca captivity and retire all current whales. It eventually was made law in 2016. In June 2014, U.S. Congressmen Adam Schiff and Jared Huffman attached an amendment to the Agriculture Appropriations Act, requiring the USDA to update regulations under the Animal Welfare Act of 1966 in regards to cetacean captivity. It passed with "unanimous bipartisan support".

The company and Village Roadshow in 2014 signed a development agreement for additional Asian theme parks, but by December 2016 the agreement expired. SeaWorld revived its Dubai plans in 2016 with a SeaWorld Park that eventually opened on Yas Island in 2022. This was the first park not to feature orca whales.

In August 2015, SeaWorld announced an 84% drop in second quarter 2015 net income compared to the year before. Total income was down 3% from 2014 to 2015. Visitors fell by 100,000, from 6.58 million to 6.48 million. The board of directors appointed Joel Manby as president and chief executive officer starting April 7, 2015. Manby considered it a key to his plans for the company to develop fully integrated theme park resorts, including lodging and dining on site, plans which had been discussed many times previously but never realized.

In November 2015, SeaWorld announced plans to end killer-whale shows at its theme park in San Diego, and in the following March, SeaWorld announced it would end its orca breeding program and begin to phase out all live performances using orcas.

On March 24, 2017, Blackstone Group announced that it would sell its remaining 21% stake to Zhonghong Group. Manby stepped down in late February 2018 as CEO. After a time with interim leadership, the company appointed Carnival Cruise chief operating officer Gus Antorcha as Seaworld CEO in February 2019. The company settled an annual pass class action lawsuit in 2018 for $11.5 million settlement, stemming from automatic renewals of annual passes.

In May 2019, Zhonghong Group defaulted on its loans which were secured by SeaWorld common stock. The company turned its shares over to its lenders, and SeaWorld terminated its agreements for park development with the group. SeaWorld Entertainment bought back 5.6 million shares from an affiliate of Pacific Alliance Group in late May 2019, while Pacific Alliance Group sold another 13.2 million shares to Hill Path Capital. Hill Path share of the company after the purchases was a controlling stake of 34.5%. SeaWorld agreed to have three Hill Path director nominees join its board.

After seven months in the post, CEO Gus Antorcha resigned on September 16, 2019. That same day, its Orlando call center was laid off and replaced by an outsourcing company. The board hired Sergio D. Rivera, previously president and CEO of ILG Inc.’s vacation ownership business, as a replacement in November 2019, who resigned on April 6, 2020. Chief financial officer Marc Swanson was appointed as interim CEO.

After several years of development Sesame Workshop and SeaWorld Entertainment opened a second Sesame Place in San Diego in 2022.

=== United Parks & Resorts and Sesame Workshop lawsuit (2024–present) ===
In January 2024, SeaWorld Entertainment announced that it would be changing its name to United Parks and Resorts Inc., effective February 12, 2024. This rebranding would not affect the names of any theme parks. The company changed its ticker symbol on the New York Stock Exchange from SEAS to PRKS on February 13, 2024. On March 12, 2026, Sesame Workshop sued United Parks & Resorts for a breach of contract for the Sesame Street brand agreement and its usage in its domestic theme parks.

== Current properties ==
Parks	Locations	Themes	Opening dates	Notes
Busch Gardens
Tampa	Tampa, Florida, United States	African culture	June 1, 1959	N/A
Williamsburg	Williamsburg, Virginia, United States	European culture	May 16, 1975	N/A
SeaWorld
San Diego	San Diego, California, United States	Ocean adventure, exploration and wildlife	March 21, 1964	N/A
Orlando	Orlando, Florida, United States	Ocean adventure, exploration and wildlife	December 15, 1973	N/A
San Antonio	San Antonio, Texas, United States	Ocean adventure, exploration and wildlife	May 27, 1988	N/A
Abu Dhabi	Yas Island, Abu Dhabi, United Arab Emirates	Ocean adventure, exploration and wildlife	May 23, 2023	Owned by Miral Group, under license from United Parks & Resorts.
Sesame Place
Philadelphia	Langhorne, Pennsylvania, United States	Sesame Street	July 30, 1980	Licensed by Sesame Workshop
San Diego	Chula Vista, California, United States	Sesame Street	March 26, 2022	Licensed by Sesame Workshop
Aquatica
Orlando	Orlando, Florida, United States	Tropical recreations	March 1, 2008	N/A
San Antonio	San Antonio, Texas, United States	Tropical recreations	May 19, 2012	N/A
Stand-alone
Adventure Island	Tampa, Florida, United States	Water fun	June 7, 1980	N/A
Water Country USA	Williamsburg, Virginia, United States	Water fun	June 20, 1984	N/A
Discovery Cove	Orlando, Florida, United States	Marine life	July 1, 2000	N/A

== Former properties ==
Busch Gardens parks

- Pasadena, California (1905–1937)
- Van Nuys, Los Angeles, California (1964–1979)
- Houston, Texas (1971–1972)

SeaWorld parks

- SeaWorld Ohio (Aurora, Ohio) (1970–2000)

Other parks

- Cypress Gardens (Winter Haven, Florida) was purchased alongside the SeaWorld parks in 1989, then sold to the park's management team. The park closed in 2009. Acquired by Merlin Entertainments in 2010, the park now operates as Legoland Florida, which opened in October 2011.
- Boardwalk and Baseball (Haines City, Florida) was purchased alongside the SeaWorld parks in 1989, but was promptly closed.
- PortAventura (Salou, Spain) was constructed in 1995 in a joint venture between The Tussauds Group (40,01 %), La Caixa (33,19 %), Anheuser-Busch (19,9 %) and FECSA (6,7 %). In 1998, the majority of Tussauds Group's shares in the park were sold to Universal Destinations & Experiences. Universal bought out its partners in 2004.
- Sesame Place (June 1982 – October 1984) Irving, Texas

== Other units ==
- Resort Development Group, hotel and retail development unit
- Deep Blue Creative, creative division
  - Theme Park Development, U.S.A., unit consisting of two teams to develop attractions, food experiences and retailing
    - Project Management
    - Guest Experiences
  - Theme Park Development, Global – feasibility, development and site evaluation of new parks and new business models
  - Resort Development – land planning, resort and hotel development, new hospitality experiences
  - Events and Entertainment – in resort live entertainment support team for theater, restaurant and retail to encourage repeat visits
  - Media Enterprises – film, television, and music business
  - Expedition X -prototyping and new technology

== Media projects ==
Project	Type	Date	Co-producers	notes
Saving A Species: The Great Penguin Rescue	TV special	2006		Discovery Kids Outstanding Children/Youth/Family Special Emmy at the 34th annual Daytime Emmy Awards
Turtle: The Incredible Journey	film	2011		
	digital story books		Ruckus Media	
Turtle Trek	app		Sleepy Giant Entertainment	
SeaWorld Kids with Franklin and Friends	multimedia: 2 specials; books		Corus: Nelvana Enterprises; Kids Can Press	
Billy Green Builds!	animated TV series		Little Airplane Productions	preschool, 52 x 11-minute
Yonaguni	animated TV series		DQ Entertainment; Rollman Entertainment	52 x 11, kids 6-11
Sea Rescue	documentary TV series	April 7, 2012— September 29, 2018		Litton's Weekend Adventure
Wildlife Docs	documentary TV series	October 2013—2019		Litton's Weekend Adventure (2013–2018); One Magnificent Morning (2018–2019)

== See also ==
- Incidents at SeaWorld parks
- Blackfish (film)
- Sea World (Australia) – Australian theme park with similar name
