= Busch Gardens Tampa Bay =

Animal theme park in Tampa, Florida, US

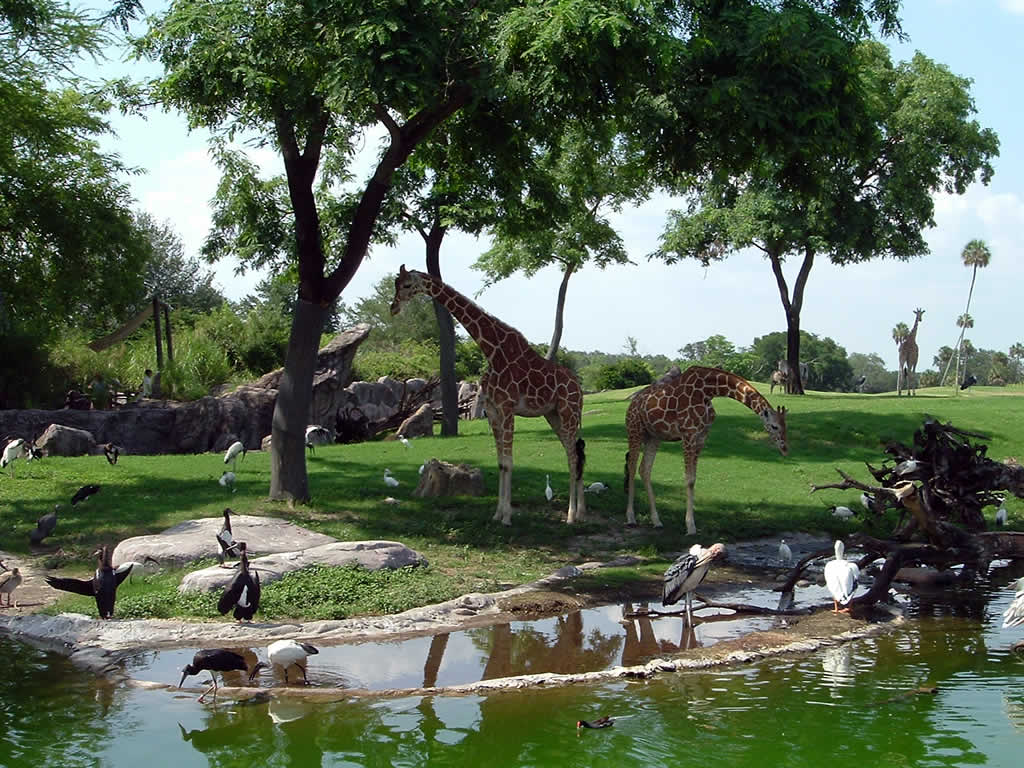
- A view of the Serengeti Plains in 2006
- Interactive map of Busch Gardens Tampa Bay
- Location: Tampa, Florida, US
- Coordinates: 28°02′15″N 82°25′21″W
- Status: Operating
- Opened: March 31, 1959; 67 years ago
- Owner: United Parks & Resorts
- General manager: Brian Bacica
- Theme: Africa
- Operating season: Year-round
- Attendance: 3,210,000 (2021)
- Area: 335 acres (136 ha)

Attractions
- Total: 28 as of 2025
- Roller coasters: 8
- Water rides: 1
- Website: Official website

Busch Gardens Tampa Bay is a 335-acre (136 ha) animal theme park in Tampa, Florida, United States, with the entire park landscaped and designed around an African theme. It is owned and operated by United Parks & Resorts and typically draws more than 4 million visitors a year, often making it the company's second-most-visited park after SeaWorld Orlando. The park opened on March 31, 1959, in connection with Anheuser-Busch's Tampa brewery.

Busch Gardens is known for its roller coasters and thrill rides, including the dive coaster SheiKra, the cheetah-themed "family-style" thrill coaster Cheetah Hunt, the launched roller coaster Tigris, and the wood-steel hybrid hypercoaster Iron Gwazi. Falcon's Fury is the second-tallest free-standing drop tower in North America, and one of few that tilts riders to face the ground. Montu was the tallest and fastest inverted roller coaster in the world when it opened, and Phoenix Rising is North America's tallest and longest family inverted roller coaster. The park also has several rides and attractions for young children and a river rafting ride.

== History ==
=== 1957–1959: Busch Brewery and Gardens ===
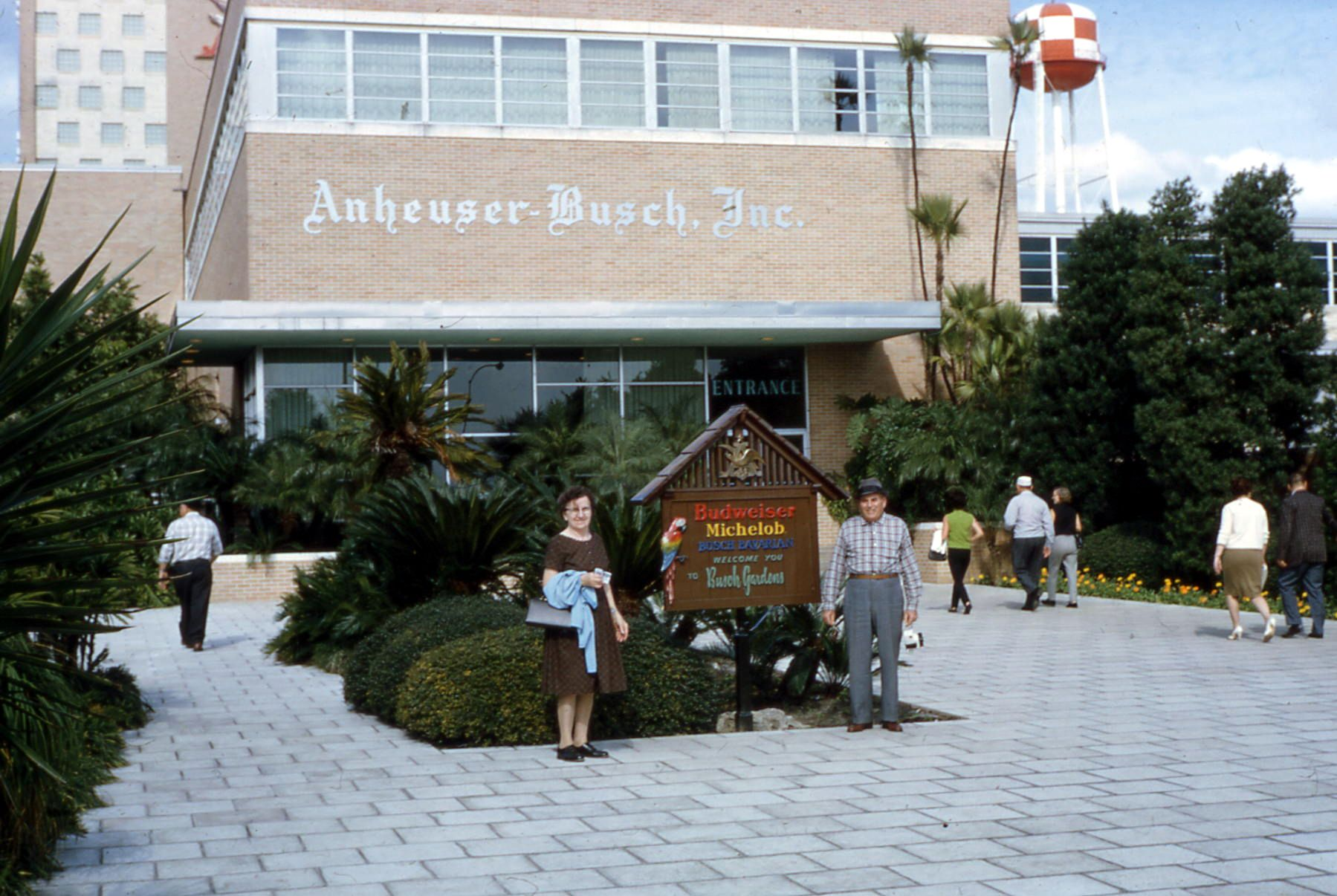
The Busch Brewery in 1967

Anheuser-Busch proposed acquiring land in Florida to construct a brewery with Tampa and Jacksonville as potential sites in April 1957. By June, unconfirmed rumors were reported that a $25–30 million brewery would be built in Tampa, but were initially denied by Anheuser-Busch. Anheuser-Busch made public on July 25, that it had purchased a 160-acre (65 ha) plot of land in Tampa for $320,000 to construct a $20 million brewery. The construction of the Tampa brewery coincided with the construction of a competing brewery, Schlitz, in the Tampa Industrial Park complex. August Busch Jr. remarked during the planning of the brewery that the company wanted to include gardens to attract the local community and contribute landscaped areas. Busch Jr. held the opinion that functional parks could help widen Anheuser-Busch's interest.

In March 1958, August Busch Jr. commemorated the groundbreaking for the Tampa brewery. Construction took place through the rest of 1958 and early 1959. In February 1959, Anheuser-Busch acknowledged the brewery would open in March. A dedication ceremony for the brewery was scheduled in March, though the opening of the Busch Gardens would not take place until June when the brewery's beer would begin to ship. Manufacturing in the Busch brewery began on March 12. The brewery was dedicated on March 31, by August Busch Jr. with around 2,000 people in attendance, including the press, political and local leaders. Anheuser-Busch formally announced the operating hours of the Busch brewery and gardens in May.

The brewery and gardens officially opened to the public for tours on June 1, 1959, as an admission-free facility with 250 attending the opening ceremony and around 1,000 attendees to Busch Gardens. Busch Gardens opened on 15-acre (6.1 ha) of land southwest of the brewery at the cost of around $500,000. The associated gardens featured lagoons and landscaping, with around 36,000 flowering plants and 300 trees. Opening animal attractions for Busch Gardens included a bird show in an amphitheater seating around 200 individuals, a bird sanctuary featuring flamingos and a separate animal area named "Devil's Island," and caged enclosures for eagles and cockatoos. Additional attractions included a dwarf village and the "Hospitality House," a William B. Harvard designed facility that offered free samples of beer to guests. Another 118-acre (48 ha) was used for housing the brewers Budweiser Clydesdales, and planned to host buffalo, ostriches, and zebras located east of the brewery. The original gardens was later dubbed the "Bird Gardens".

=== 1959–1968: Additions and African veldt ===
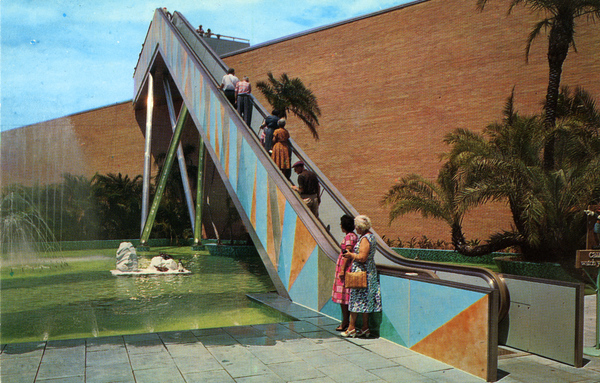
The Stairway to the Stars escalator outside the Busch Brewery

A $5 million expansion was announced in July 1959 by Anheuser-Busch to the existing facility. In February 1960, construction started on a geodesic dome in the gardens that was 22.5-foot (6.9 m) high and 90 feet (27 m) in diameter, later opening on March 22, at the cost of $75,000. The dome, named the Adolphus Busch Space Frame, was constructed from anodized aluminum colored gold and located north of the bird amphitheater. The dome featured landscaping, suspended birds nests, and ponds that connected to a lagoon outside. Anheuser-Busch revealed its plan to construct the Stairway to the Stars attraction in October, which would be a 86-foot (26 m) Otis escalator to the roof of the brewery. The escalator opened on March 22, 1961, as part of a renovation to the Busch brewery and its public tours. The escalator featured a 5,000-square-foot (460-square-metre) pool beneath, a 1,000-square-foot (93-square-metre) observation deck atop of the brewery, and a 150-foot (46 m) raised walkway to enter Busch Gardens. The pool originally hosted penguins.

Anheuser-Busch bought additional parcels of land in May 1962. In the same month, Anheuser-Busch communicated its intentions to expand Busch Gardens at the cost of $3.5 to $4 million as the company projected a rise in attendance for the coming decade, necessitating growth. The expansion called for different themed lands, with an African veldt and the American Plains planned, accompanied by wildlife animals pertaining to each geography. The additions would also call for a railway and create more landscaped environments for animal habitats. In October, Busch Gardens expanded its animal collection to around 1,000 birds. As part of the expansion, Anheuser-Busch stated a monorail would be constructed through the African veldt in January 1963, and a four-story Swiss-themed restaurant in December, both east of the brewery. Another land purchase was made by Anheuser-Busch in April 1964, their third since the opening. Thomas J. Pinta was named manager of Busch Gardens in July. Busch Gardens debuted a trackless transportation train on October 1, to travel between the gardens and the Old Swiss House via the parking lot. The Old Swiss House was completed in October.

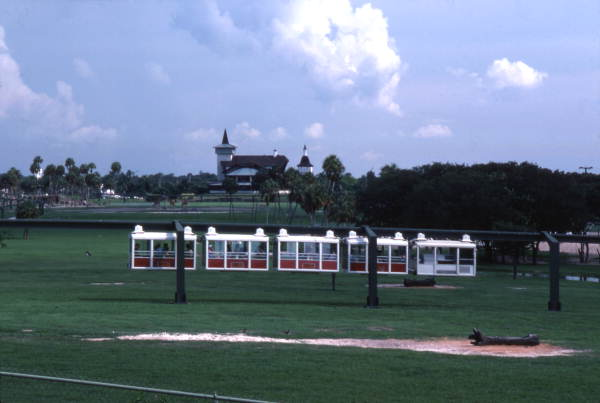
The monorail with the Old Swiss House in the background in 1977

The Wild Animal Kingdom, representing the African veldt, was completed in 1965, in addition to a clock tower built adjacent to the Old Swiss House. The African veldt contained a variety of animals mostly imported from Africa, including cheetahs, chimpanzees, elephants, gorillas, lions, and rhinos with habitats faithfully recreated by the park. By November, Anheuser-Busch acquired land east of its existing property for a potential expansion of Busch Gardens or its brewery. The gardens and brewery encompassed around 208 acres (84 ha), with the total acreage owned by the brewer amounting to around 268 acres (108 ha).

A portion of the 1965 land purchase would be used for a trackless transportation train to shuttle guests between a new parking lot and its facilities in the latter half of 1966. Busch Gardens began charging guests for parking in August because of the increase in visitors and to offset costs. The monorail, originally named the Skyrail, opened to the public on September 22. The Skyrail opened as a 7,000-foot (2,100 m) long Arrow Development monorail taking parkgoers through the African veldt, which was an upcharge for adults and children initially costing $1 and 40¢ respectively. Near the end of 1966, around 475 animals were exhibited in the African veldt. A snack bar was constructed and opened in the parking lot in 1967.

=== 1969–1975: Boma and themed area expansions ===
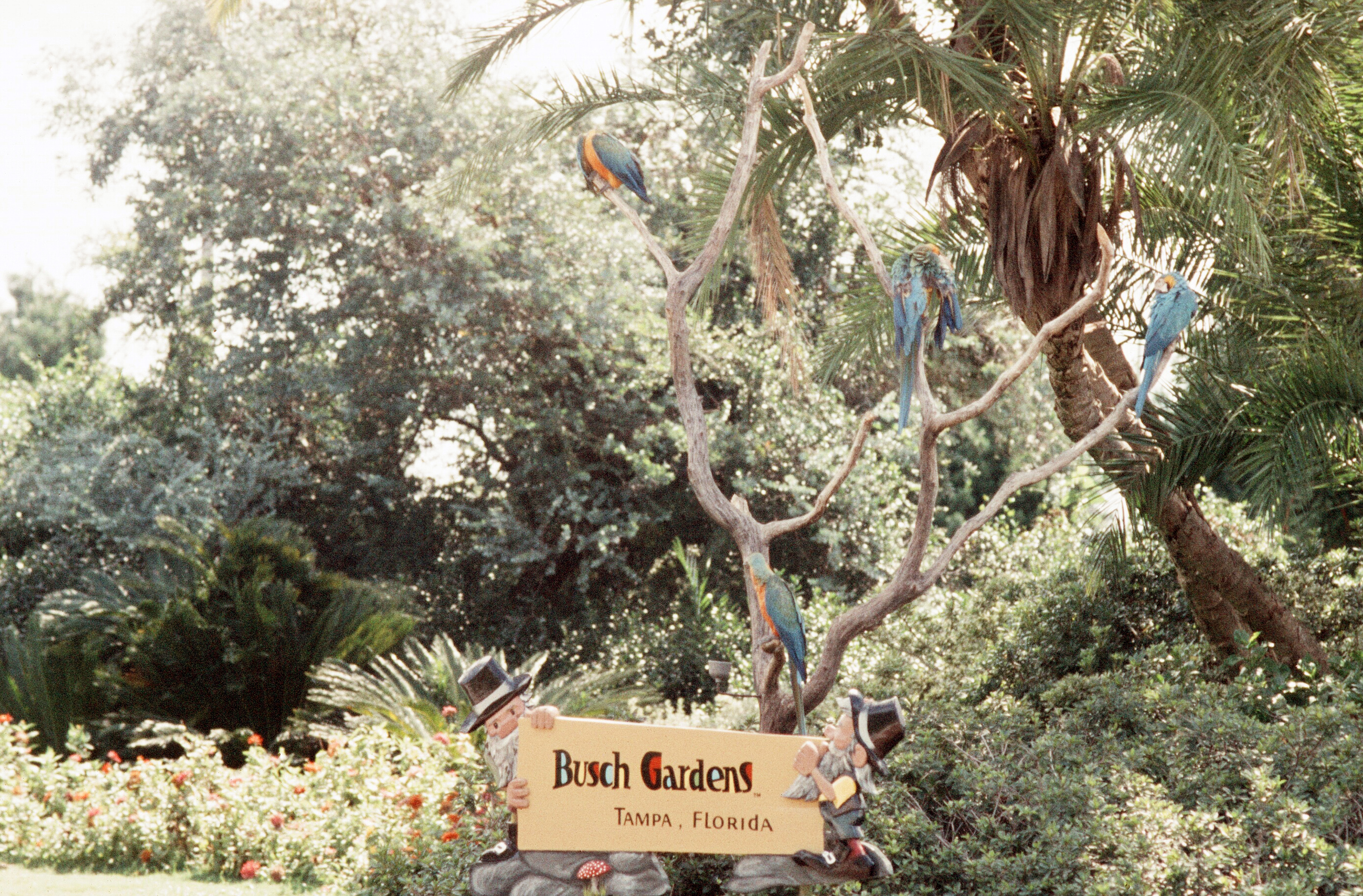
A sign located near the entrance of Busch Gardens in 1972

For the coming year, Anheuser-Busch announced in March 1969 a 2.5-acre (1.0 ha) zoo area expansion entitled "Boma" to the current gardens. The exhibit space would cost $1 million, located between the brewery and the monorail, and contribute to the growth of the brewery and park. Busch Gardens saw short manager changes with Pinta being replaced by Franklin H. Rust in May 1969, and Rust resigning in February 1970. Anheuser-Busch expressed its intention to expand its animal habitats, coinciding with the development of Disney World in the vicinity of Orlando, Florida. August Busch Jr. had toured the Disney World site and wanted the Tampa brewery and gardens to maintain its hold in the tourist market. The Anheuser-Busch Tampa location was favored amongst its other four properties, being the company's leading model into the entertainment industry.

During the preview event for the Boma area in June 1970, Anheuser-Busch announced a $12.6 million expansion for the coming decade. The expansion would initially call for the additions of an amphitheater seating 1,000 guests, a "tree tops" viewing platform of the African veldt, a locomotive train, and a log flume. The plans also stipulated the end of free-admission and charging a general admission to the park as well as getting rid of parking admission. General admission to the park was implemented on July 31, coinciding with the opening of the Boma area that featured African mammals, birds, and a manmade mountain. The initial price of entry to the park was $1.25 for adults and 50¢ for children. The park's entrance was relocated during the same day to an adjacent road. The immediate extension of Busch Gardens called for the construction of a railroad, African village, and an amphitheater in the following years.

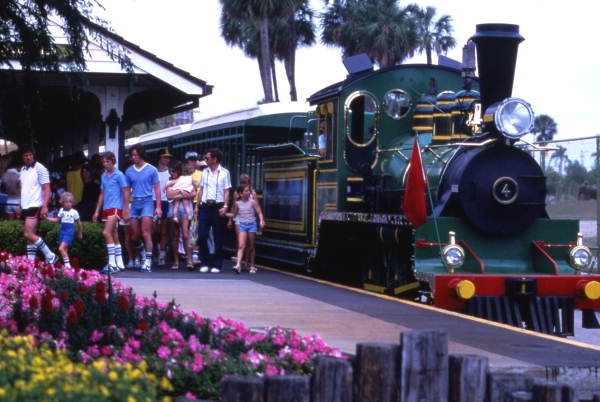
Busch Gardens Trans-Veldt Railway from the Nairobi Junction station

Robert B. Bean was named the new general manager for the Busch Gardens park in April 1971. The Trans-Veldt Railway opened on July 4, between the monorail and Boma section. The train departed from the "Nairobi Junction" station into the animal habitat and was an upcharge attraction. In January 1972, the tree tops observation deck was being constructed at the cost of $250,000, opening months later with the African village on June 19. The African village, located north of the original gardens, accommodated the Stanleyville station, an additional train station on the Trans-Veldt Railway. The African village contained the Tanzanian Theater featuring an elephant show, gorilla and okapi enclosures, and various shops. The tree tops was a three-level observation deck in the northern half of the African veldt and only reachable by the Trans-Veldt Railway upon opening. During this time, the monorail and railway upcharges were eliminated, with the general admission increased in price. The boat ride in the African village, titled Livingstone's Landing, later opened in the summer of 1972.

A $6.5 million addition was announced in March 1973 for a phase two development of the 1970 expansion plans. The plans would affect three park sections: Boma, Stanleyville (renamed from the African village), and the African veldt. The plans called for a Morocco-themed area, a log flume, a dark ride, a gondola lift, an "animal training center," and a safari attraction. Busch Gardens opened a nearby campervan park in May. The first thrill ride at the park, the log flume, opened in June in the Stanleyville section. Bean resigned as general manager and was replaced by Joseph C. Fincher in April 1974. The sky ride transportation gondola opened in May, which linked the park's monorail station, tree tops outlook, and Stanleyville section together.

By 1975, the park housed over 800 animals and expanded its live entertainment options throughout the park. Busch Gardens opened its Morocco-themed village on April 16, acting as the new entrance to the park. The Morocco area hosted shops, landscaped areas, eateries, and the Algiers Theater upon opening. The snack bar originally located in the parking lot was incorporated into the Morocco area with thematic upgrades. In September, the park disclosed a $7.6 million development that would include the park's first roller coaster, exhibits for tigers and elephants, an extension to Livingstone's Landing, extensive landscaping, and the addition of sound systems throughout the park.

=== 1975–1989: The Dark Continent and continued growth ===
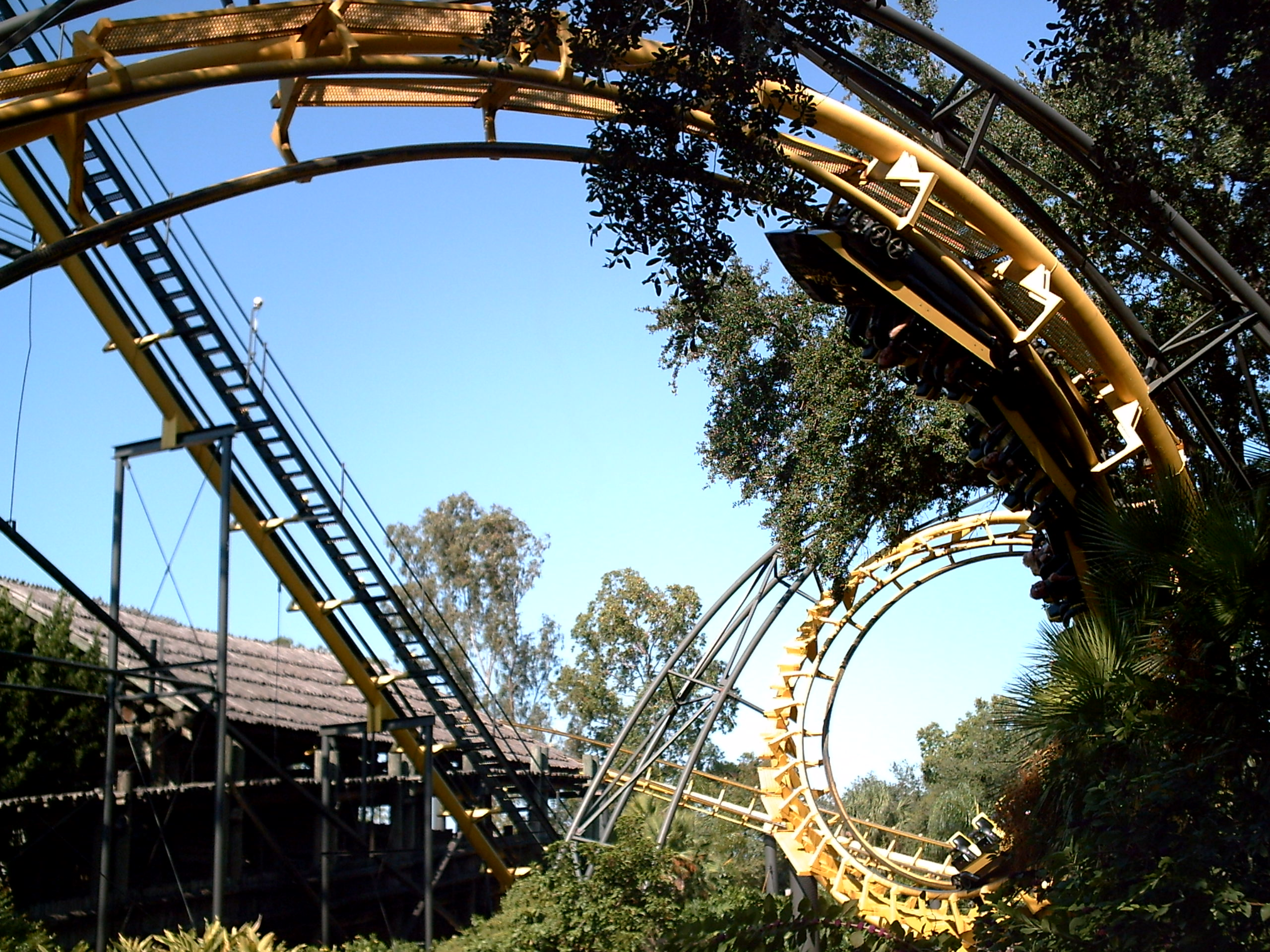
The Python roller coaster with a train traversing its corkscrew

Near the end of 1975, Busch Gardens launched a new campaign that sought to promote the Tampa park around a centralized older Africa theme. The rebrand of the Busch Gardens park would introduce aspects of live entertainment, advertising, animal displays, and thrill rides. The beginning of the 1976 year saw the park take on a new name as "The Dark Continent". The Dark Continent was chosen to distinguish Busch Gardens from other comparably named attractions in Florida, such as the Tiki Gardens and Sunken Gardens. As part of the campaign, the African veldt became known as the Serengeti Plain, Boma became Nairobi, and the Moroccan village was formally dubbed Marrakesh.

Work on the last part of the $7.6 million development, another themed area known as the Congo, began in January 1976. Python, a steel roller coaster manufactured by Arrow Development, premiered on July 1, as the park's first roller coaster. An octopus-style flat ride, named the Monstrous Mamba, constructed by the Eyerly Aircraft Company was opened shortly after in 1976. Both additions were part of Stanleyville and located in the northern half of the section. A marching brass group known as the Mystic Sheiks of Morocco began performing throughout the park in 1976. The Congo section opened on July 26, 1977, next to Stanleyville and located northwest in the park's layout. The Congo incorporated the Python roller coaster and Monstrous Mamba into its themed land. The land saw the transformation of Livingstone's Landing into the African Queen boat ride. In addition, the land hosted a shooting gallery, the Bengal tiger's Claw Island exhibit, and an Intamin swing ride entitled the Swinging Vines. Bumper cars were opened in 1977.

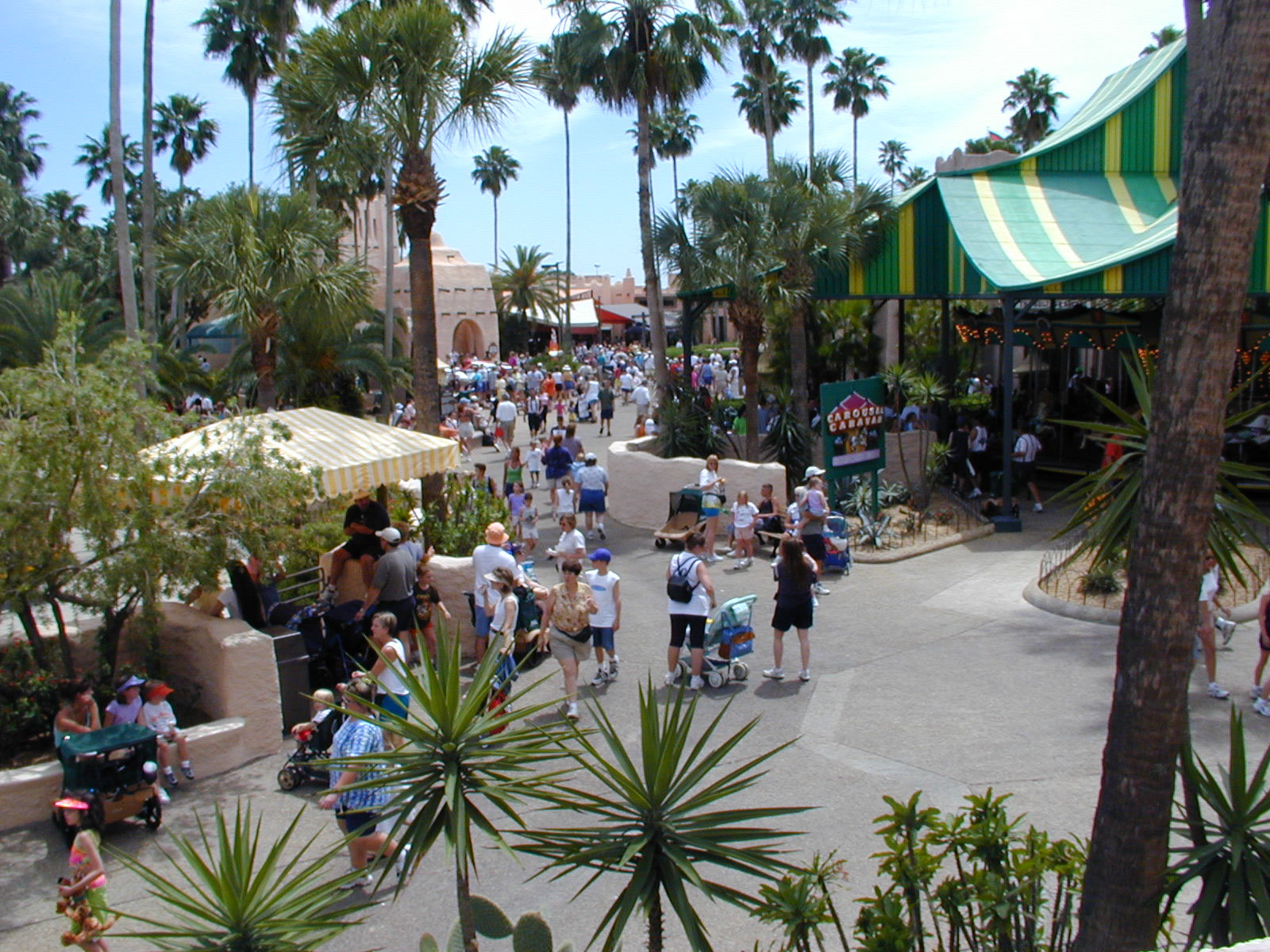
The Timbuktu section with architecture and carousel

An unspecified addition to the park was disclosed in May 1978 at a cost of between $5 and $10 million, including a large dining facility. During 1978, Anheuser-Busch made land acquisitions extending their total property to encompass around 350-acre (140 ha) in Tampa. Construction was well underway in November for the expansion titled Timbuktu. In February 1979, the park unveiled a $18.5 million expansion that would include the Timbuktu addition and a new water park adjacent to the park called Adventure Island. The Timbuktu addition would mark the 20th anniversary of the park's opening. It would also connect the Congo and Nairobi sections, include a large dining facility, several attractions, and an amphitheater. The Trans Veldt Railway operated a new station in the area in 1979. Continuing with the developments for the past years was the announcement of a $20 million hotel in April, though was later delayed. Parts of the Timbuktu section began to open in late 1979.

At the beginning of 1980, the park was operated by the newly formed Busch Entertainment Corporation, a subsidiary of Anheuser-Busch, to separately manage its entertainment and beer assets. In the early 1980s, the tree tops observation platform closed in favor of a Congo train station. A variety show debuted in the since-renamed Stanleyville Theater in 1980. The park officially opened the Timbuktu section of the park in January 1980. The section opened with a Chance Rides carousel and trabant, a dolphin show in the Dolphin Theater, the Sandstrom orbiter, the Festhaus dining hall with a dance show, an airplane ride, various game booths, and specialty shops. Scorpion, a Schwarzkopf steel roller coaster, later opened in Timbuktu on May 16. To boost attendance in the park, Busch Gardens revealed plans for a $6 million river rapids ride for the Congo section in 1981. In 1982, the Old Swiss House closed indefinitely for structural renovations and white tigers were introduced to the park in the Claw Island exhibit. The 1,380-foot (420 m) Intamin Congo River Rapids ride opened on May 26.

For the 1983 season, the park added children rides to the Timbuktu and Congo sections. Additionally, the Marrakesh Theater opened in the southern portion of the Marrakesh area with a Moroccan-American dance show. In the latter half of 1983, Dwarf Village was reconstructed to appeal to younger audiences. The Dwarf Village reopened with a miniature log flume, a car ride, and various play areas. In November, Anheuser-Busch stated it would deemphasize and slowly shift away from "The Dark Continent" name in favor of "Busch Gardens" as the name did not catch on with park visitors and was not as recognizable. The return of the prominent Busch Gardens name would bring changes to the slogan and logo. The following year, an Intamin looping starship, Phoenix, opened in the Timbuktu section on June 5, 1984. The eagle enclosure was relocated to a different location under the brewery escalator in January 1985. A new elephant habitat was created in the Nairobi section in 1986. The Moroccan Palace Theater was completed on August 11, and debuted the show, Kaleidoscope, on August 22. Upon its opening, the Moroccan Palace Theater was the park's main venue to host larger style productions. An animal nursery, named the Nairobi Field Station, opened on December 9.

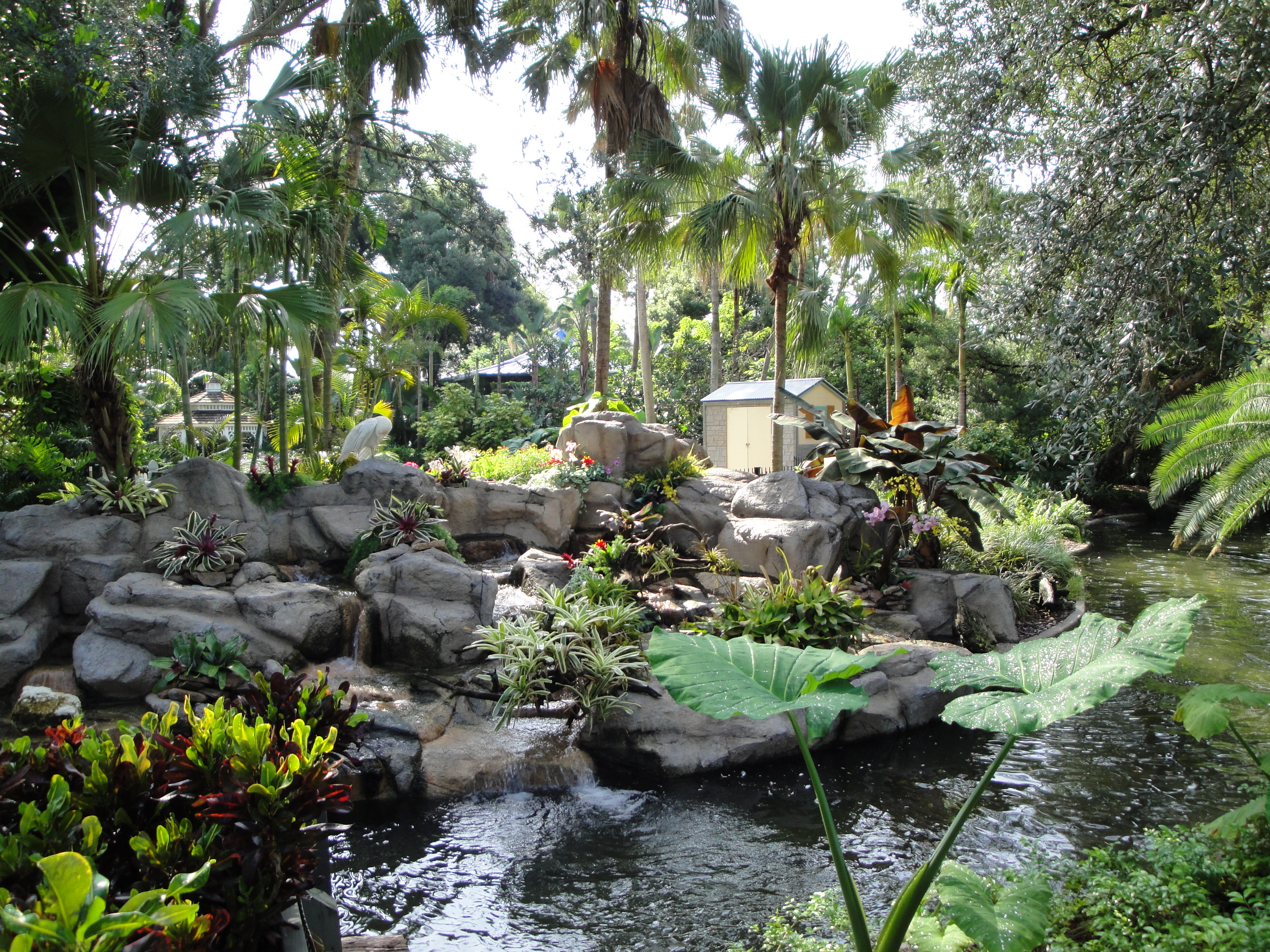
The bird gardens of Busch Gardens

The bird show gained a birds of prey segment including falcons, eagles, and owls in February 1987. Busch Gardens leased a pair of pandas from the Chinese government in October 1987, with a temporary 120-foot (37 m) exhibit opening in the bird gardens on November 17. To accommodate the pandas, new bird aviaries were built in the gardens. The first panda on loan left in April 1988 while the second left in October 1988. The monorail received electric trains in 1988. The aviary dome was removed in the same year due to the expansion of the brewery. By the end of 1988, park officials were considering several additions such as a new boat ride, another show for the Moroccan Palace theater, new exhibit spaces, and reopening the Old Swiss House. The park had started a refurbishment of the Moroccan snack bar, the Zagora Café, and relocated the white tigers to the panda's previous enclosure. Busch Gardens officials planned to launch promotions to attract the European tourist market and draw on its unique position in the Florida amusement park industry.

For the park's 30th anniversary, Busch Gardens announced a shoot the chute water ride named the Tanganyika Tidal Wave, a koala exhibit, and a Clydesdale stable for the coming year. Previews of the Intamin-made Tanganyika Tidal Wave began on June 15, and officially opened weeks later. The water ride replaced the African Queen boat ride and featured a nature walk named the Orchid Canyon. The koalas exhibit opened in the previous panda enclosure on June 28. The Clydesdale Hamlet opened south of the monorail station on August 11, housing four Clydesdale horses.

=== 1990–1999: Thrill additions and animal habitats ===
By the early 1990s, Busch Gardens sought to add more attractions to maintain the attention of the public and amusement industry trends. The panda exhibit, introduced in 1988, was the last significant attraction introduced to the park. Busch Gardens officials recognized the need for a subsequent addition. The campervan park was closed in 1990 due to the decline in sales. The former Old Swiss House reopened as the Crown Colony House in early 1990. A restaurant was added on the top floor of the renovated building utilizing an African theme. The Swinging Vines attraction was removed around 1991. The park announced Questor in May 1991, a motion simulator ride manufactured by Reflectone, which opened on May 23. Located near the Clydesdale stables and Crown Colony House, Questor featured the story of explorer Sir Edison Fitzwilly pursuing the Crystal of Zed through different landscapes.

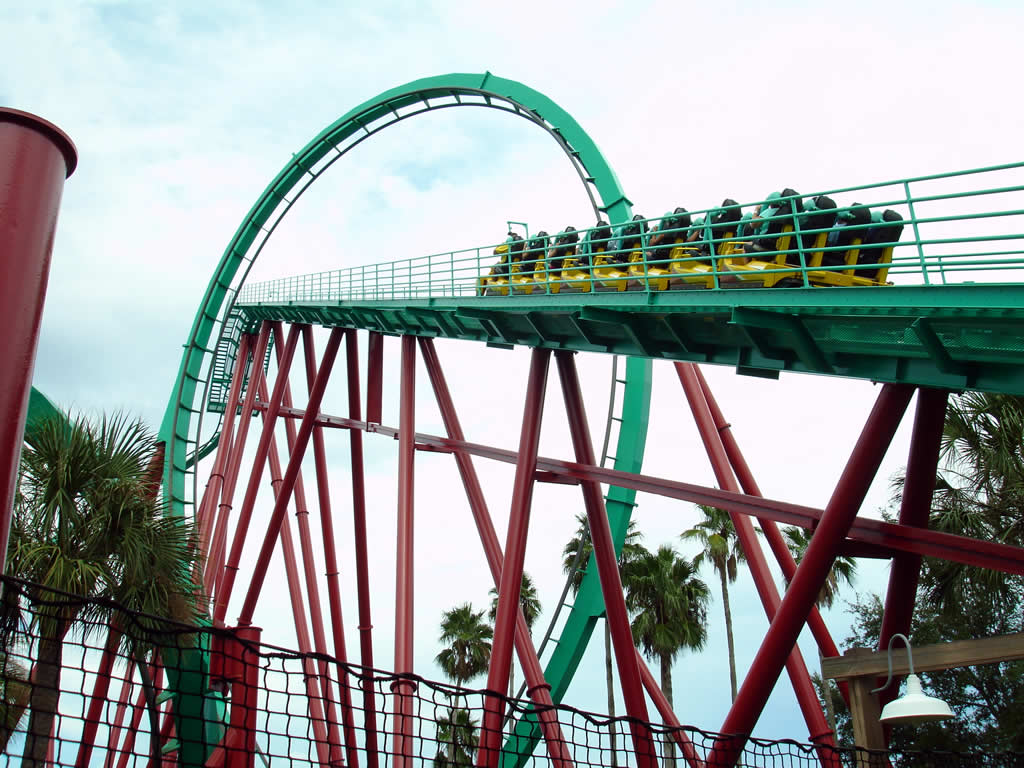
The Kumba roller coaster ascending its lift hill

To maintain its hold in the Florida theme park market, Busch Gardens unveiled plans to construct the Myombe Reserve, a 3-acre (1.2 ha) chimpanzee and gorilla exhibit that would replace the Boma section. The exhibit opened on June 17, 1992, with its entrance located near the Moroccan Palace Theater. The park hosted a temporary Olympic village for the U.S. team in July as a sponsor of the 1992 Summer Olympics. Continuing efforts to expand, the park revealed plans in November to construct a signature steel roller coaster within the Congo section named Kumba. Manufactured by Bolliger & Mabillard, the roller coaster would be constructed in the northwest area of the park near the Congo River Rapids and bumper cars. The roller coaster debuted with a height of 143 feet (44 m), a track length of 3,978 feet (1,212 m), and reached speeds of 60 mph (97 km/h) upon opening on April 21, 1993. In 1994, a kids area named the Land of the Dragons was earmarked to replace the Dwarf Village. The Stanleyville variety show saw its production close in 1994, after fourteen years, and a new ice skating show debut in the Moroccan Palace Theater titled, Hollywood Live on Ice, in November.

The construction of the Wild Animal Kingdom prompted Busch Gardens to map out a competitive strategy for the coming years in preparation for its first direct competitor in the Florida theme park market. The Land of the Dragons opened on May 9, 1995, debuting on a 1.5-acre (0.61 ha) area featuring a large three-story tree house, miniature cars, a ferris wheel, and rope bridge. The dragon retheme was done to update the area and adopted from its sister park in Williamsburg. The success of Kumba prompted the park to file plans for an Egypt section in May that would include the park's fourth roller coaster, shopping, and a train station. Additional details of the Egypt land were revealed in August. Anheuser-Busch stated it would close the brewery inside the Busch Gardens Tampa location on October 25. The plant on the Busch Gardens property had become the smallest brewery of the company's 13 and was slated to close down because of decreased beer consumption and high per-barrel costs. The shutdown was part of an overall restructuring effort, with the 17-acre (6.9 ha) land transferred to the park. The Monstrous Mamba flat ride closed in the fall season. A safari upcharge attraction was opened to the public in November riding through the Serengeti Plain section. The park's brewery closed in December and was later demolished.

The park began expanding its international marketing efforts in Brazil, Germany, and the United Kingdom in 1996. In addition, the park hosted another temporary Olympic village as a sponsor of the 1996 Summer Olympics. The Egypt section opened to guests on May 16, located in the south east portion of the park at the cost of $5 million. The section included a recreation of King Tut's tomb, a sand pit, Egyptian hieroglyphs structures, and the Bolliger & Mabillard inverted roller coaster, Montu. Montu was created at the cost of $10 million, opening as the world's longest and tallest inverted roller coaster. Busch Gardens entered a theme park partnership in June with SeaWorld Orlando, Universal Studios Florida, and Wet 'n Wild Orlando to compete with Disney. In the same month, the park considered the feasibility of a hotel, the latest effort since the 1980s. In October, park officials disclosed plans for an animal exhibit section at the cost of $20 million.

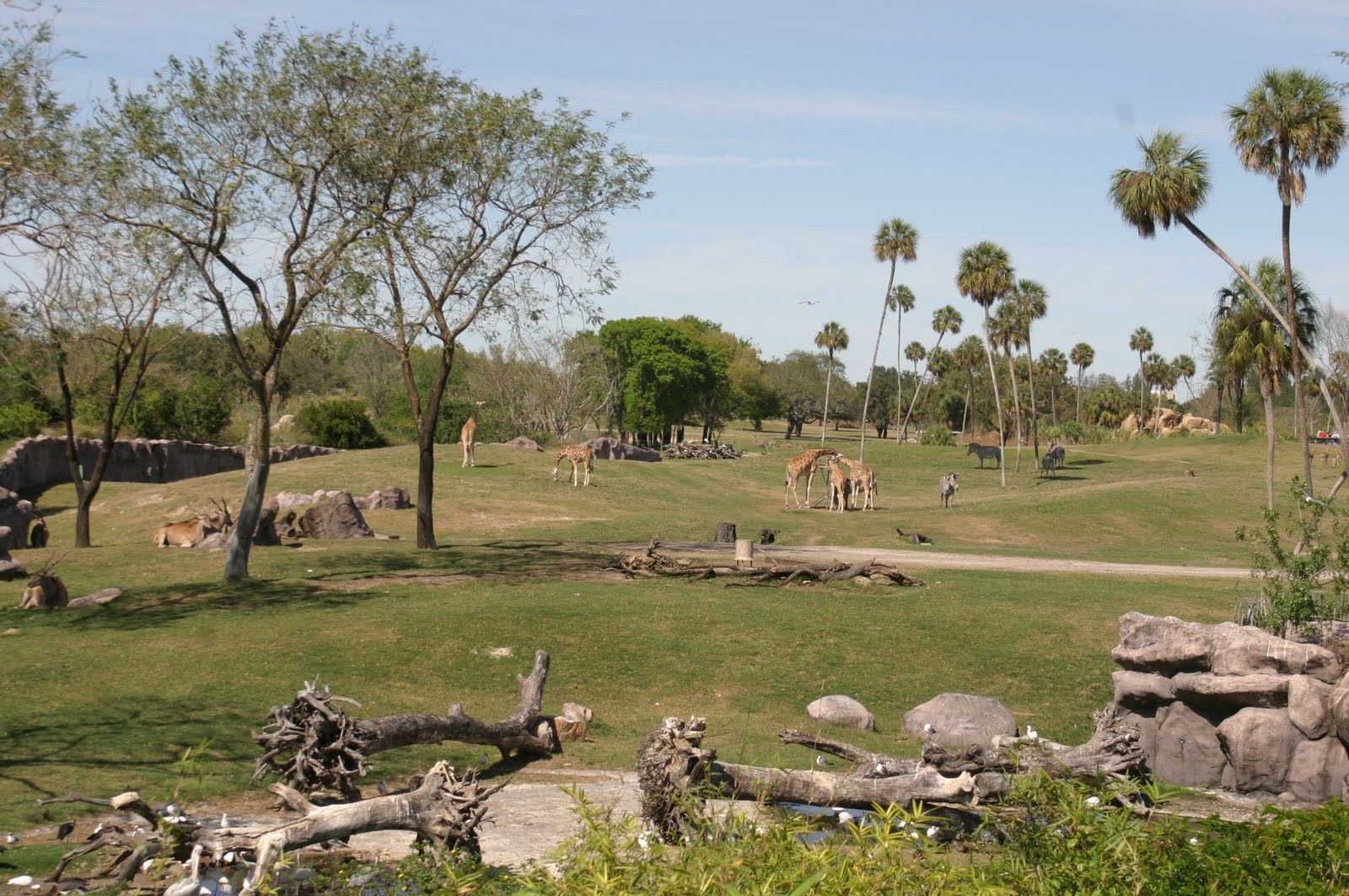
Various animals located in the Serengeti Plain

General manager Fincher was replaced by Robin D. Carson in a corporate shuffle in February 1997. The Edge of Africa animal exhibit section opened on July 4. Located in the middle of the park on a 15-acre (6.1 ha) parcel of the Serengeti Plain, the animal exhibit featured crocodiles, hippos, hyenas, lions, meerkats, and vultures among an African village and wildlife themes. Plans for an entertainment complex, the likes that would rival Disney's Animal Kingdom, were in the planning stages in December 1997. Further improvements to the park were disclosed, including a refurbished simulator ride and a bird walk through exhibit. An arcade area would open in the Egypt section in April 1998. The simulator ride, Akbar's Adventure Tours, opened on May 12, replacing Questor. The walk through Lory Landing bird exhibit opened in May 5, near the Land of the Dragons. In June, updated plans for the entertainment complex cited a $10 million ride to open in the coming year, which would later be revealed as the dueling wooden roller coasters, Gwazi, in July. Busch Gardens purchased a 108-acre (44 ha) area north of San Antonio, Florida, for an animal retirement facility in September.

In the ensuing year, the Tangiers Theater was replaced by a confectionary store. The monorail closed on May 13, 1999, with demolition occurring on the same day. Gwazi opened on June 18, on the former site of the Anheuser-Busch brewery. The park would debut its first family-friendly Halloween event, titled the Spooky Safari, in October. Occurring in the same month, the San Antonio facility for the park's animals opened, as well as plans to revitalize the Serengeti Plain were announced. Landscaping and physical barriers were planned to separate animals, bring wildlife closer to the train, and include several animals such as antelopes, gazelles, giraffes, and zebras.

=== 2000–2009: Updates and end of Anheuser-Busch ownership ===
Up to 2000, Busch Gardens' manager, Carson, had replaced several long-time executives and created a new leadership team to rejuvenate the park because of growing competition from other Florida theme parks. Instead of investing in technologically innovative and expensive rides, the park sought to attract guests through unique experiences with interactive wildlife elements. The park began advertising its location as a holiday destination within the Tampa Bay area as Disney had done in Orlando. To retain attendance from returning visitors, Anheuser-Busch began offering a "Fun Card" to Florida residents at their Busch Gardens Tampa and SeaWorld Orlando theme parks beginning in 2000. The pass would provide benefits and ability to visit the park to the end of the year and would replace most of its discount programs previously offered. Park officials revealed plans to construct Rhino Rally in May, a Land Rover safari attraction for the coming year. The revitalized 29-acre (12 ha) land of the Serengeti Plain debuted to the public on June 22, including an add-on tour in a truck through the animal habitat. Busch Gardens premiered Howl-O-Scream, a new iteration of its Halloween event from the previous year in October, adopting the event from its sister park in Williamsburg after its success and in hopes of challenging Universal's Halloween event.

The Busch Gardens logo introduced during the 2003 season

After its success, the Fun Card was reintroduced in 2001 for Florida residents. Rhino Rally opened to the public on May 23. After the events of the September 11 attacks, Anheuser-Busch temporarily closed its parks, but reopened the following day. Starting in June 2002, the park was the first Florida to offer a second day free entrance when it rained during a guests stay. In August, the park indicated it would replace its Dolphin Theater with a 4D film theater. Several projects were proposed to open during the 2003 season, including a white rhino habitat, an add-on zoo keeper experience, a revitalized Timbuktu area with the Das Festhaus restaurant being rethemed, and the premiere of the 4D film, Haunted Lighthouse. A new logo would also be introduced to phase out an old one used for 20 years prior. General manager Carson was replaced by Dan Brown in mid-May. The 4D film debuted in the newly constructed 750-seat theater in May, with the Timbuktu revamp and the Kasbah restaurant scheduled to open soon after. The 26-acre (11 ha) area for the three white rhinos from South Africa debuted in June.

Starting in June 2003, Busch Gardens introduced the "Summer Nights" event offering extended hours during the summer season nights. The park began construction in late-2003 on its parking lot to accommodate new tunnels to be built under McKinley Drive for easier access to the park. With August Busch III taking more interest in the Anheuser-Busch parks to help in monetary gains, Busch Gardens also announced an overhaul to its entertainment options. During this time, park officials formally scrapped the hotel entertainment complex plan. Busch Entertainment stated it would move its wild mouse roller coaster, Wild Maus, from Busch Gardens Williamsburg to its Tampa park and replace the Crazy Camel trabant flat ride.

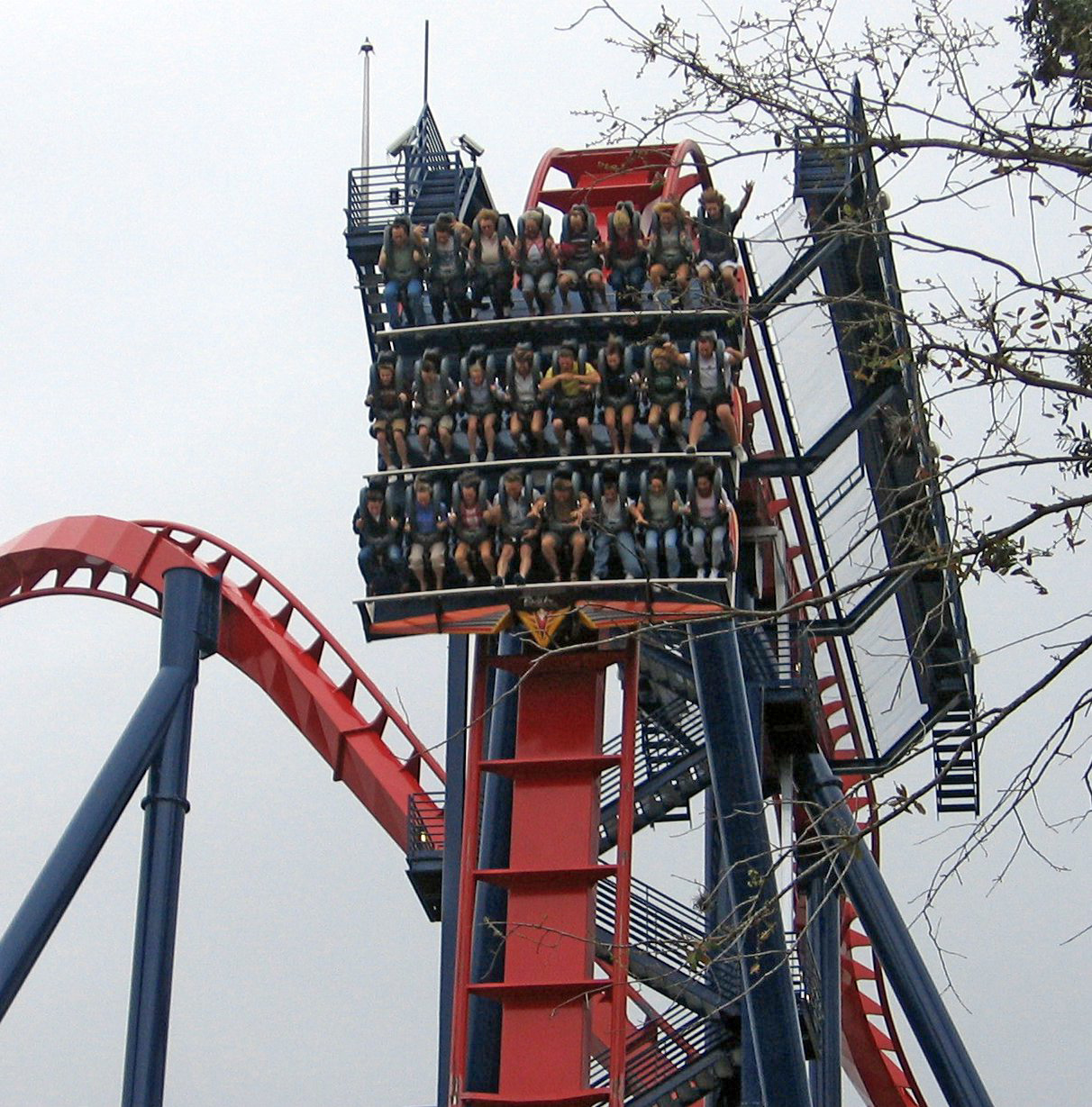
A SheiKra train entering the second drop into a tunnel

The Kasbah restaurant would be renamed the Desert Grill in 2004. The wild mouse roller coaster, Cheetah Chase, opened in February. The park announced in October the construction of SheiKra, a 200-foot (61 m) steel roller coaster to be located in the Stanleyville section and built by Bolliger and Mabillard. In January 2005, the park implemented fingerprint scans to replace ticket photo identification, deployed kiosks for self-service, and a new entrance. A gift shop in the bird gardens was reintroduced as the Xcursions shop. In addition, construction on the road tunnel for transportation trams and parking was completed and opened on January 7. SheiKra opened on May 21, becoming the tallest roller coaster in Florida and the first Dive Coaster model built in the United States. A barbecue restaurant also opened within the confines of the Stanleyville section.

Beginning in 2006, Busch Gardens Tampa Bay began marketing itself in the short term as Busch Gardens Africa, with its sister park Williamsburg having similarly adopted "Europe" to its name. The name change came as part of an effort to distinguish both parks as unique from each other and to drive more visitors. However, the use of Tampa Bay would still be used in local marketing. By 2006, the park had also updated five activity areas. A new 4D film, Pirates 4-D, debuted in the Timbuktu Theater on February 18, replacing the Haunted Lighthouse. After 30 years of operation, the Python roller coaster closed on October 31, for a planned expansion in 2008. The closure included part of the Congo section surrounding the roller coaster, including the Claw Island exhibit and a restaurant.

The park's bird show in the Bird Gardens ended in 2007, after 48 years of production. The bird show would later be replaced by an animal show titled Critter Castaways. The roller coaster, SheiKra, closed temporarily in May 2007 and reopened in June with floorless trains. Busch Gardens revealed its plans in September to build a $16 million section, named Jungala, where the Python roller coaster once stood. The 4-acre (1.6 ha) land would house several animal habitats, involving Bengal tigers, Tomistoma, flying foxes, gibbons, and orangutans. The area would also host several attractions that included a "mini space shot", a sit-down zip line, a play area, educational areas, and restaurants. General manager was taken over by Donnie Mills, as Brown left for a position at Busch Entertainment in December.

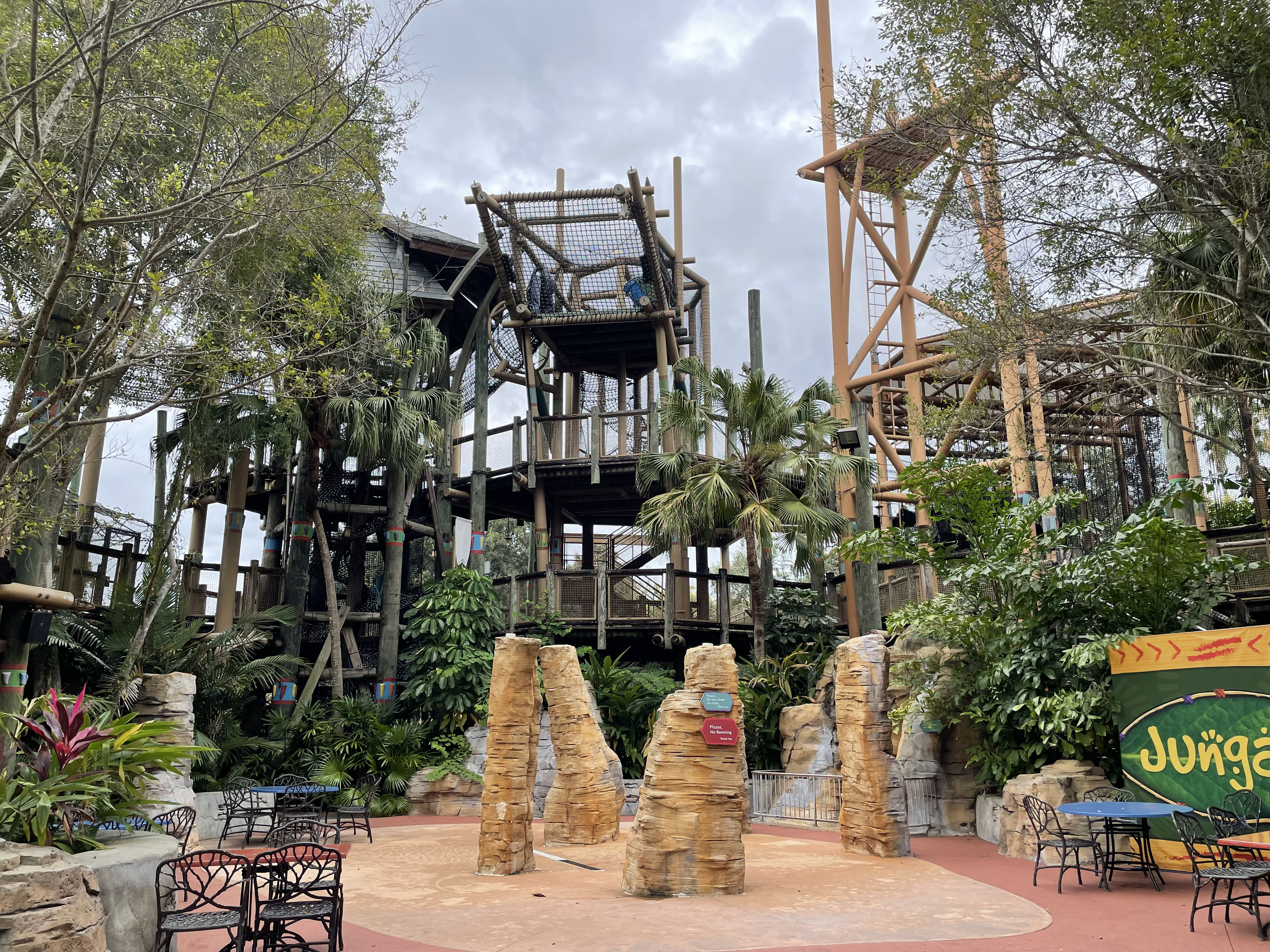
The Jungala play pavilion

Jungala opened on April 5, at a higher estimated cost of around $40 million. The park section was marketed for age groups between older adolescents and young teenagers, who would be too young for their SheiKra roller coaster but too old for the Land of the Dragons area. Belgian brewer InBev was reported in May to make a potential bid for Anheuser-Busch. The bid by InBev came when consolidation of companies was largely taking place and amid national competition for Anheuser-Busch. The Belgian brewer considered the sale of the Busch Entertainment division to help fund its buyout of Anheuser-Busch, which composed of ten theme parks including Busch Gardens Tampa Bay. InBev formally proposed its bid to Anheuser-Busch's board of directors on June 11. By June 26, Anheuser-Busch contemplated restructuring and dropping some of its assets, such as Busch Entertainment, to strengthen its profitability and rationalize its refusal of InBev's bid. The next day, InBev filed suit to prepare a facilitated takeover bid of Anheuser-Busch through the removal of its board of directors. InBev formally drafted its takeover bid on July 7, placing speculation as to a possible buyer for Busch parks, anticipated changes to park operations, and its identity.

A merger between Anheuser-Busch and InBev was negotiated on July 13, forming Anheuser-Busch InBev. In the deal, InBev reaffirmed the merger would be funded by the sale of subsidiary assets, which added to the uncertain future of Busch Gardens Tampa park. It was theorized that the Busch Entertainment parks may form their own company, be sold off independently, or be sold together. Potential buying participants were speculated to be the Blackstone Group, Cedar Fair, Parques Reunidos, and Six Flags, as all were operating parks domestically or globally. In early August, it was reported that the Blackstone Group, operating Merlin Entertainment, and Parques Reunidos, were emerging to bid for the Busch parks. Talks of the acquisition were ongoing in November, with industry officials signaling a deal might take place during summer in 2009. As part of its plan to sell off Busch parks, Anheuser-Busch InBev ceased free beer samples for guests at the beginning of 2009, having been in place since the parks opening. The park also deemphasize Anheuser-Busch products by reducing, removing, or replacing several offerings. For the park's 50th anniversary, park officials asked the public to bring in memorabilia to be displayed in a temporary historic museum. The building that housed the former Akbar's Adventure Tour simulator ride and U.S. Horseshow Jumping Hall of Fame was turned into a museum in March, with guest and corporate contributions displayed.

In June 2009, it was anticipated that the Busch Gardens Tampa park would replace its Land of the Dragons area with a Sesame Street area as its Williamsburg sister park had done. Busch Gardens revealed in August it would build the kids area, with the plans calling to enlarge the section, add a roller coaster for kids, and retheme several attractions to fit the Sesame Street theme. Rumors of Busch Gardens' sale were reported in September, as the Blackstone Group was becoming more prominent to purchase the parks with a deal close in October. Anheuser-Busch InBev announced it would sell Busch Entertainment to the Blackstone Group on October 7. The acquisition saw the Clydesdale horses removed, but allow the continuation of the Busch Gardens name, as well as previous programs, employees, and leadership from before its purchase. Busch Gardens Tampa Bay began to be operated by the renamed SeaWorld Parks & Entertainment division in December, with the last Anheuser-Busch symbols from the park taken out.

=== 2010–present: New ownership and additions ===
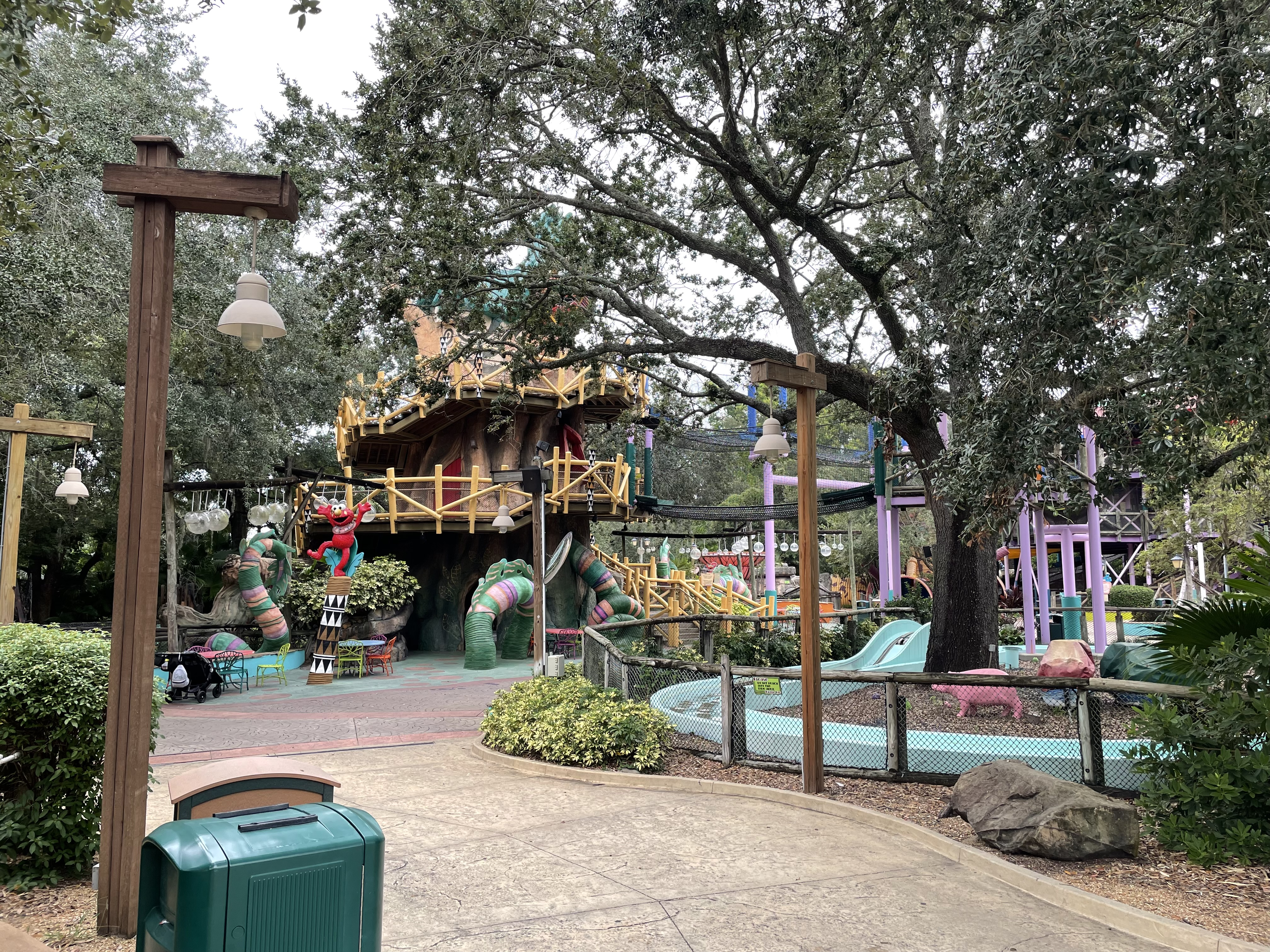
The Sesame Street Safari of Fun

General manager Mills was replaced by Jim Dean in the role of park president in February 2010. The Mystic Sheiks of Morocco band ceased performances in 2010, and a new 4-D film based on the Sesame Street cast would debut in the Timbuktu Theater, replacing Pirates 4-D. The Sesame Street section opened as Sesame Street Safari of Fun on March 27, on a 2.5-acre (1.0 ha) area. A walk through kangaroo enclosure, titled the Walkabout Way, opened in the Bird Gardens area on June 14. Busch Gardens announced two attractions for the coming year on October 13, with an Intamin-made launched roller coaster named Cheetah Hunt located in the former monorail station and a cheetah enclosure titled Cheetah Run.

Busch Gardens disclosed on May 16, 2011, a replacement to the old rhinoceros enclosure with a 16,000 sq ft (1,500 m^{2}) Animal Care & Nutrition Center. Cheetah Hunt and its associated Cheetah Run enclosure opened on May 27. Disney discontinued their Grad Night event in 2011, leading to Busch Gardens to pick up its own event for graduating local high schools.

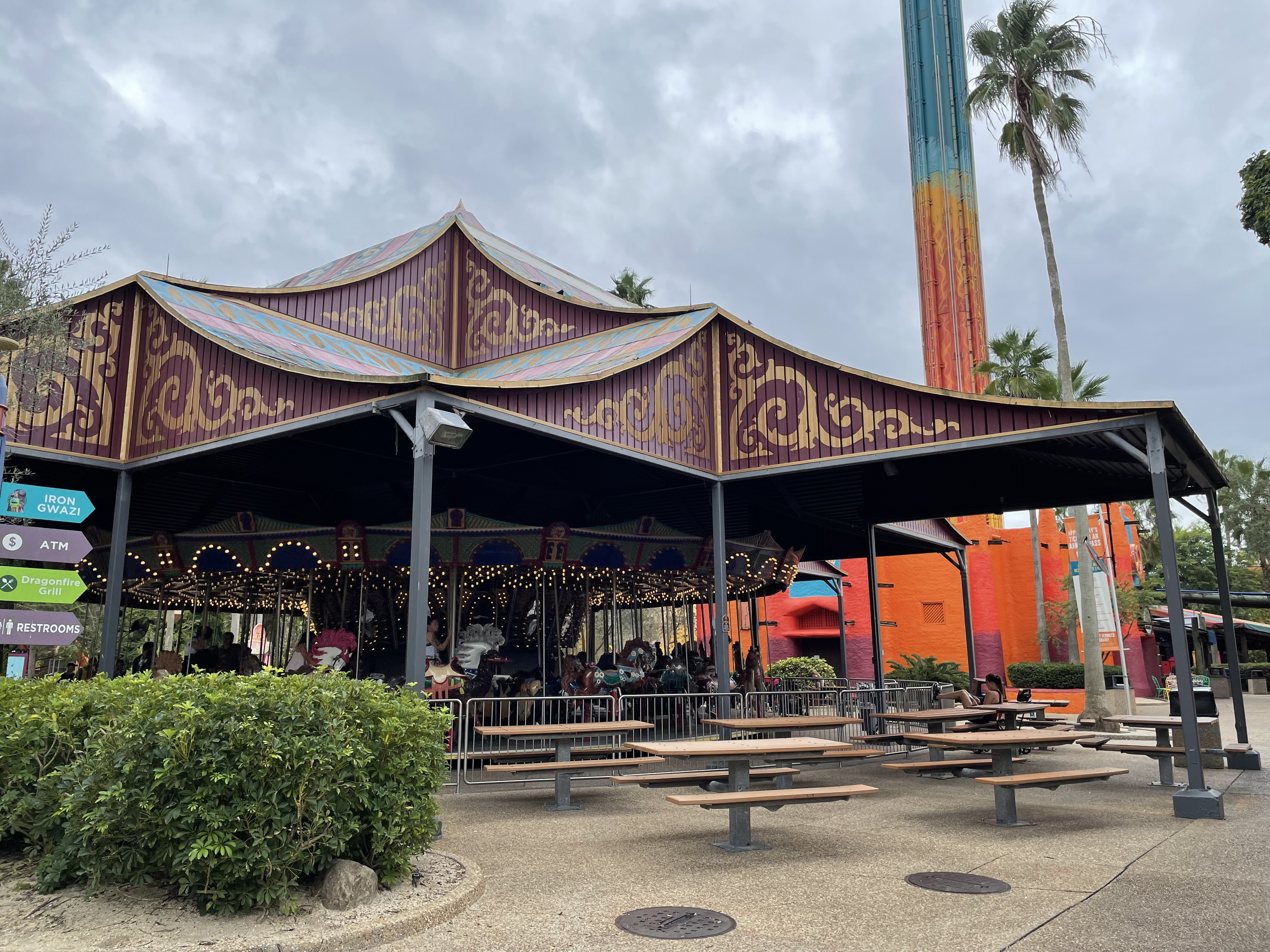
The Pantopia section, with the carousel and Falcon's Fury drop tower

Busch Gardens opened its Animal Care Center on January 23, 2012, at an estimated cost of $5 million in the Nairobi section. A winter event, titled Christmas Town premiered in November and would continue on into December. SeaWorld Parks & Entertainment changed the logo and slogan of its Busch Gardens parks in February 2013, choosing a "coaster tree" to represent the park's environment and rides. The Stanleyville Theater was enclosed in 2013. The Sandstorm orbiter flat ride would close in June, which would make way for a 335-foot (102 m) drop tower named Falcon's Fury to open within the next year. The Intamin-made drop tower would be located in the Timbuktu section and drop riders face down. The park's Crown Colony restaurant closed indefinitely by mid-2013, with industry observers citing budget cuts and slow attendance for the change in operation. Busch Gardens later revealed in November a retheme of the Timbuktu section into "Pantopia", where Falcon's Fury would be located. The Pantopia section would feature a vibrant color pallet for existing buildings, introduce a new story line for the fictional land and refreshments, keep existing rides, and open with the drop tower.

The animal show, Critter Castaways, in the Bird Gardens Theater would be moved to the Pantopia Theater following the former theater's closure in February 2014, which was subsequently demolished having been at the park since its opening. Within the same month, the park opted into Tampa's City Pass alongside other local zoos and aquariums. Falcon's Fury was delayed from its initial opening date on May 1, though, the Pantopia section officially opened. The drop tower would later open on September 2, after varied soft-openings. The safari attraction Rhino Rally permanently closed in September. The park would disclose in December that wooden roller coasters Gwazi would close in the coming months due to rising costs in operation and feedback from guests. Gwazi closed on February 1, 2015, after 15 years of operation. A new attraction for the Egypt section was disclosed in February 2015, to come the next year. A replacement of the park's Bands, Brew, and BBQ event debuted in March, as the Food and Wine Festival. Busch Gardens formally announced its Egyptian addition in May as Cobra's Curse, a spinning roller coaster to debut the following year. The previous Desert Grill reopened as the Dragon Fire Grill on June 1.

The Tanganyika Tidal Wave closed on April 10, 2016, with no plans to replace the attraction. The former Crown Colony opened with the addition of a new restaurant in May. The spinning roller coaster, Cobra's Curse, opened on June 17, in the Egypt section of the park adjacent to Montu. The Jambo Junction animal center closed indefinitely on December 9, due to corporate layoffs. Stewart Clark replaced Dean as Busch Gardens President in January 2017 following the formers departure to become President of Orlando's SeaWorld parks. Free beer samples returned to the park in May 2018, being hosted within the former Hospitality House since renamed to the Garden Gate Cafe. A Premier Rides triple-launch roller coaster, named Tigris, was announced in September to open the following year.

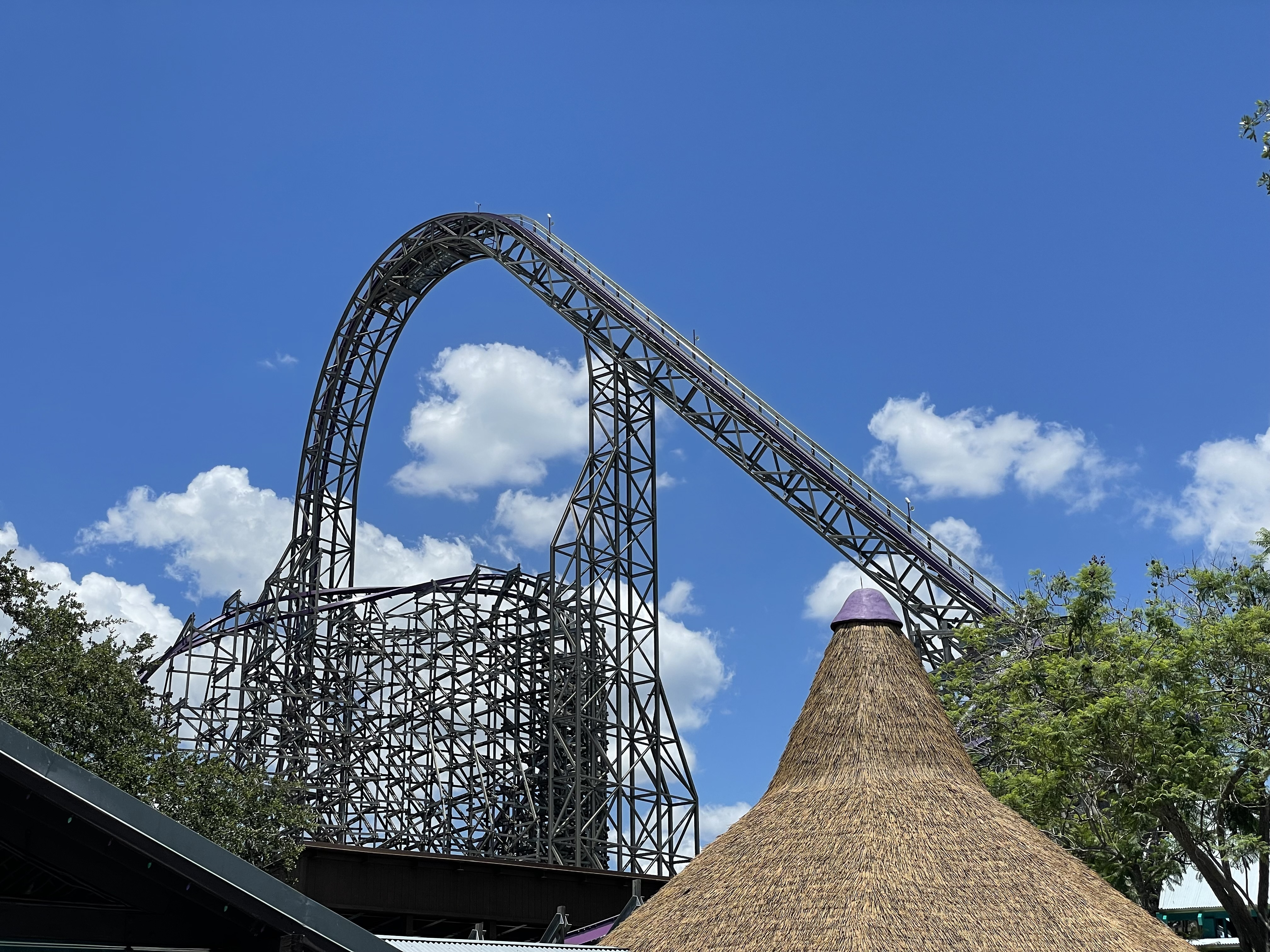
Iron Gwazi's lift hill and inversion

The park later announced in March 2019 the replacement for Gwazi as Iron Gwazi, a Rocky Mountain Construction conversion of the wooden roller coaster into a hybrid roller coaster. Busch Gardens opened Tigris, its ninth roller coaster, on April 19. Iron Gwazi, was expected to be completed by Spring 2020, however, due to the COVID-19 pandemic in Florida, the park temporarily closed from March 16 to June 11, to assist in slowing down the exposure of guests. As a result of the pandemic, the opening of Iron Gwazi was initially delayed until 2021. SeaWorld Entertainment parks as a whole saw a 96% drop in attendance figures.

Busch Gardens Tampa Bay named Neal Thurman as its new president in August, amid Clark leaving to pursue a role at SeaWorld Entertainment in September. Iron Gwazi, after several months of previews, opened on March 11, 2022. A new entrance plaza, entertainment, and pass member lounge were planned in April to come during the season. In October, Busch Gardens Tampa Bay announced the Serengeti Flyer, a Screamin' Swing, which debuted in Spring 2023. The former Garden Gate Cafe reopened as the Springs Taproom in January 2023. The wild mouse roller coaster Sand Serpent closed and was subsequently removed in July. It was replaced by Phoenix Rising which opened on July 21, 2024, as the park's tenth roller coaster.

== Park layout and attractions ==
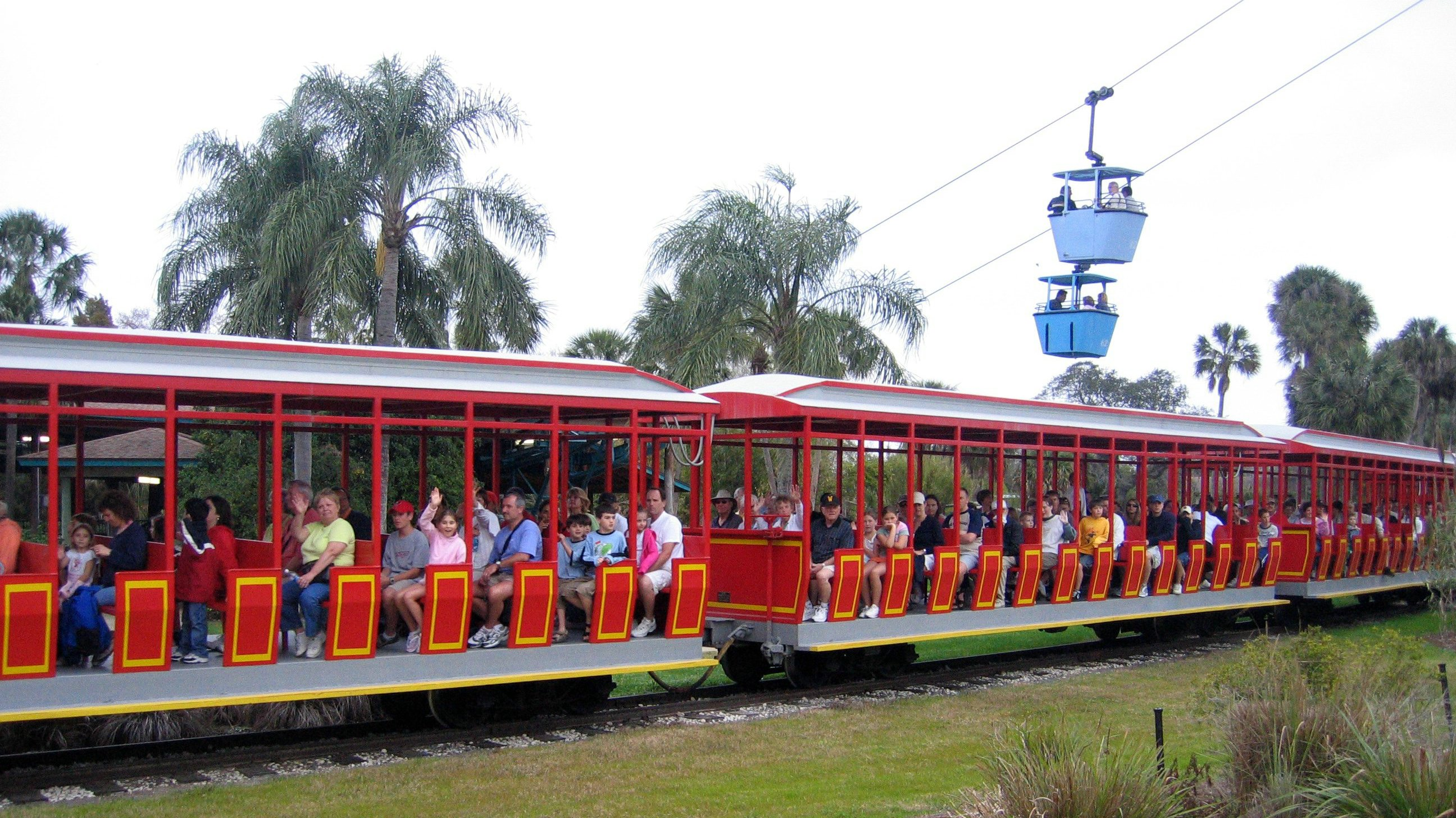
Train cars from the Serengeti Express in the foreground with the Skyride in the background

- The Serengeti Express, a 3 ft (914 mm) narrow-gauge railway, consists of a steam train that runs along the back end of the park and makes stops at the Nairobi, Congo and Stanleyville themed areas.
- The SkyRide transports guests between the Edge of Africa (near Cheetah Hunt) and Stanleyville.

=== Morocco ===
The park's main entrance is themed after the country of the same name. Treats can be purchased at the Sultan's Sweets and the Zagora Cafe. The Moroccan Palace and the outdoor Marrakesh Theater are located there.

- Gwazi Gliders, a small hang glider flat ride relocated from the Congo section's defunct Pygmy Village kids' area.
- Myombe Reserve, a 3-acre (12,000 m^{2}) home for three western lowland gorillas and nine chimpanzees located in Nairobi, opened in 1992.
- Moroccan Palace, a palace-themed ice skating theater nearby Myombe Reserve chimpanzee entrance. It hosts Busch Gardens' new ice skating show, Rhythm of Nature. The theater was also home to the park's award-winning ice skating show, Turn It Up! The Hottest Show on Ice which ran from 2017 to 2024.
- Iron Gwazi, a hybrid wooden-steel roller coaster. In 2019, Busch Gardens Tampa announced that a new hybrid coaster would be built on the space where Gwazi once stood. It was built by world-famous roller coaster manufacturer Rocky Mountain Construction. Upon its opening, it became North America's tallest hybrid coaster and the world's fastest and steepest hybrid coaster.

=== Sesame Street Safari of Fun ===
The Land of the Dragons, which itself replaced the Dwarf Village in 1995, was replaced by Sesame Street Safari of Fun on March 27, 2010. It contains all the attractions from Land of the Dragons, which are now re-themed.

- Telly's Jungle Jam, an interactive play area.
- Rosita's Djembe Fly-Away, a swing ride.
- Bert & Ernie's Watering hole, a water play area.
- Air Grover, a children's roller coaster.

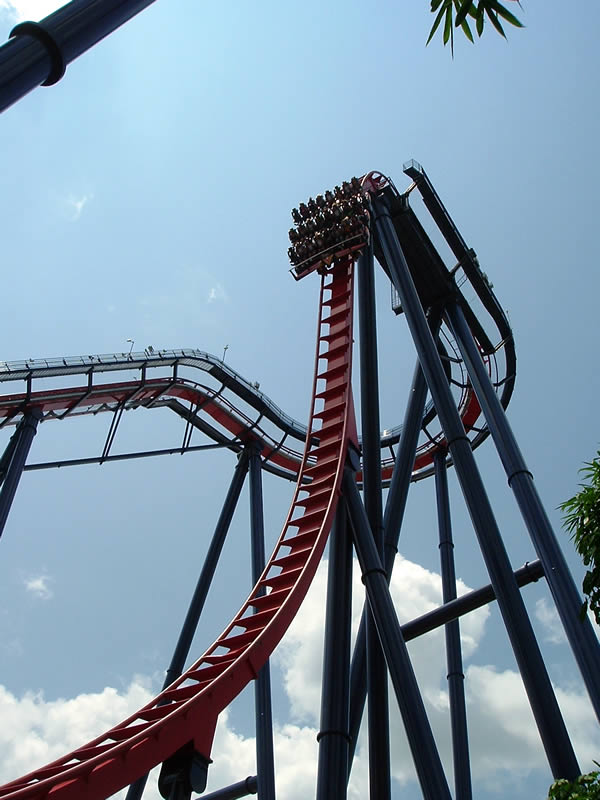
SheiKra, the first dive coaster in North America, descending its first drop

=== Stanleyville ===
This section of the park is named after the city in the Democratic Republic of the Congo that was originally known as Stanleyville (now Kisangani). This section is home to SheiKra, one of the flagship coasters. Opened in 2005, it was the first and only Bolliger & Mabillard Dive Coaster in North America until the addition of Griffon at the sister park Busch Gardens Williamsburg in 2007. It was also home to one of the park's water rides, Stanley Falls Flume, which opened with the section in 1973 and closed in 2025, along with a Premier Rides Sky Rocket II named Tigris, which opened in 2019. The African Queen Boat Ride opened in 1977 as Busch's version of Disney's Jungle Cruise. The African Queen featured live animals, including alligators, crocodiles, rhinoceroses and spider monkeys. A South American macaw rode on each boat. In 1989, the African Queen Boat Ride was converted into Tanganyika Tidal Wave with the addition of a 55-foot (17 m) drop that generated a large splash. The section remained unchanged until 2005 when SheiKra opened, and the surrounding area was renovated. Tanganyika Tidal Wave later closed in 2016 and was demolished in 2018 to make way for Tigris.

- SheiKra, a 200-foot (61 m) Bolliger & Mabillard floorless dive roller coaster with a 90-degree vertical drop. This was North America's first vertical dive coaster. The ride originally operated with floors until they were replaced with floorless trains in 2007. The ride was repainted in 2013.
- Tigris, a Premier Rides Sky Rocket II. It is located on the site of Tanganyika Tidal Wave. Tigris officially opened on April 19, 2019.

=== Congo ===
This section, themed to the jungles of Congo (including both the Republic of the Congo and the Democratic Republic of the Congo) contains the Congo River Rapids, an Intamin River Rapids ride. In November 2006, Congo underwent a major renovation, including the removal of the park's Arrow Dynamics Corkscrew roller coaster, Python. Other former Congo attractions include the Swinging Vines, a family swing flat ride which closed in the early 1990s, the Monstrous Mamba octopus flat ride which closed in the late 1990s, and Kumba, a steel roller coaster manufactured by Bolliger and Mabillard that was closed in August 2026. The Pygmy Village kids area featuring three children's rides, a teacup ride, and a kiddie swing ride relocated to Sesame Street Safari of Fun, and the Gwazi Gliders, which was also relocated to Morocco.

- Congo River Rapids, an Intamin River Rapids ride, opened in 1982. The queue also houses a Komodo dragon exhibit.
- Ubanga Banga Bumper Cars, a bumper cars ride.

=== Jungala ===
Opened on April 5, 2008, Jungala is a 4-acre (16,000 m^{2}) family attraction featuring up-close animal encounters. Another attraction is Tiger Trail, which is a walkthrough with tigers where there is also a glass turret where guests can look out right in the middle of the tiger enclosure. During the Kareebu Jungala atmosphere show, stiltwalkers perform with puppets and interact with guests in the heart of Jungala.

- Orangutan Outpost, a tree-top observation platform to watch and interact with Bornean orangutans and Sumatran orangutans. As of 2026, Busch Gardens has 5 orangutans, including 2 males and 3 females.
- Tiger Lodge and Tiger Trail: Observation areas, trails, and a bridge to watch and interact with tigers. As of 2026, the park is home to six tigers, which include Leon and Rukayah, Bandar (who is a Sumatran tiger), and Asmara (who is a Malayan tiger). In August 2026, Asmara gave birth to two cubs fathered by Rukayah.

=== Pantopia ===
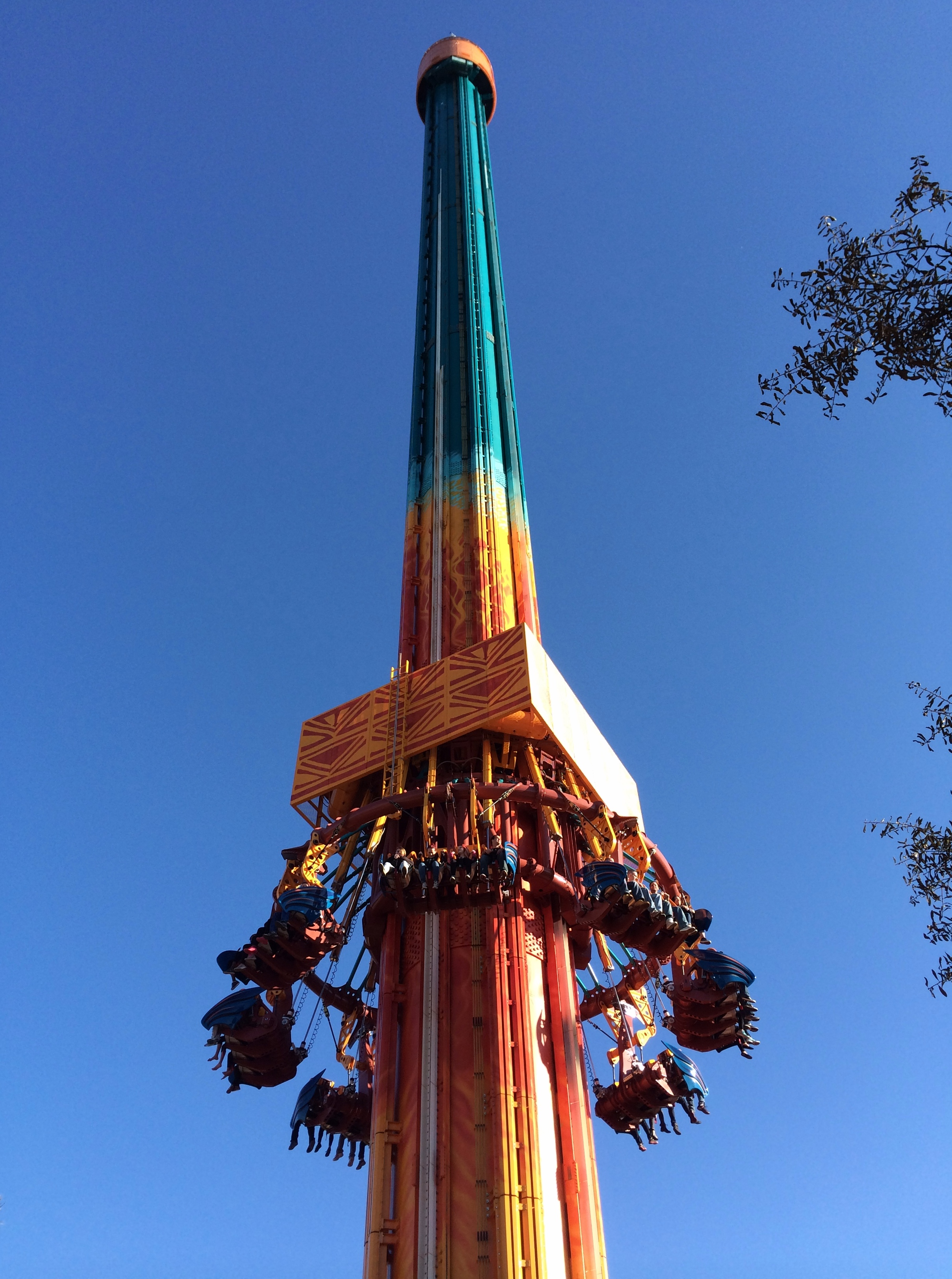
Falcon's Fury, added in 2014, as viewed from the ground with the gondola ascending

A section originally themed after the malls and bazaars of Africa that opened up in May 1980 as Timbuktu. The Phoenix, an Intamin Looping Starship, was built in 1984 and closed in 2018. It was removed in December 2022 and then replaced by Phoenix Rising, the first Bolliger & Mabillard Family Inverted Coaster to open in the United States. Sand Serpent (formerly operating at Busch Gardens Williamsburg as Wild Izzy, later Wild Maus, then Cheetah Chase when moved to Florida), was a Mack Rides Wilde Maus that opened in Florida in 2004 and closed in 2023. The section was renovated in 2003. Elements added during this facelift included the enclosing of the Timbuktu Theater, which replaced the park's Dolphin Theater with an indoor 4-D movie theater. The dolphins retired to other locations. The 4-D theater premiered with the "R.L. Stine's Haunted Lighthouse" film in 2003, followed by "Pirates 4-D" in 2006 and "Sesame Street Presents: Lights! Camera! Imagination!" in 2010. In 2004, Das Festhaus was transformed into the Desert Grill. In September 2014, Falcon's Fury, a 335-foot Intamin Sky Jump, opened. Replacing the former Sandstorm orbiter flat ride. This section of the park was re-themed to Pantopia alongside the opening of Falcon's Fury.

- Pantopia Theater, an indoor theater that originally housed Opening Night Critters with the opening of Pantopia in 2014. In Spring 2019, it is now home to Critters Inn Charge after Opening Night Critters closed.
- Caravan Carousel, a carousel with horses, camels, and chariots.
- Falcon's Fury, an Intamin Sky Jump that has a speed of 60 miles per hour (97 km/h) and tilts 90 degrees towards the ground. It is the tallest free-standing drop tower in North America at 335 feet (102 m).
- Phoenix Rising, a B&M, family inverted roller coaster with an over-banked curve that brings riders close to flipping upside down above the ride's entrance sign. It is Busch Gardens' newest operating roller coaster and North America's tallest and longest family inverted roller coaster.

=== Nairobi ===
Named after the capital of Kenya, animals like alligators and crocodiles can be observed here up close. Guests can view mammal and reptile exhibits. Visitors to Nairobi can meet the Animal Ambassadors who travel the country and make educational appearances at Animal Connections. The area also contains Myombe Reserve, a tropical rainforest that is home to western lowland gorillas and chimpanzees. In 2012 the Animal Care Center opened, allowing guests to observe actual veterinary procedures, as well as meet the stars of Wildlife Docs, Busch Gardens' Saturday morning television show. The main train station at Busch Gardens is located at Nairobi. Another popular attraction there is the Asian elephant exhibit. Nairobi used to have a safari truck ride called Rhino Rally, similar to Kilimanjaro Safaris at Walt Disney World. The attraction closed in 2015 and was replaced in 2023 by Serengeti Flyer.

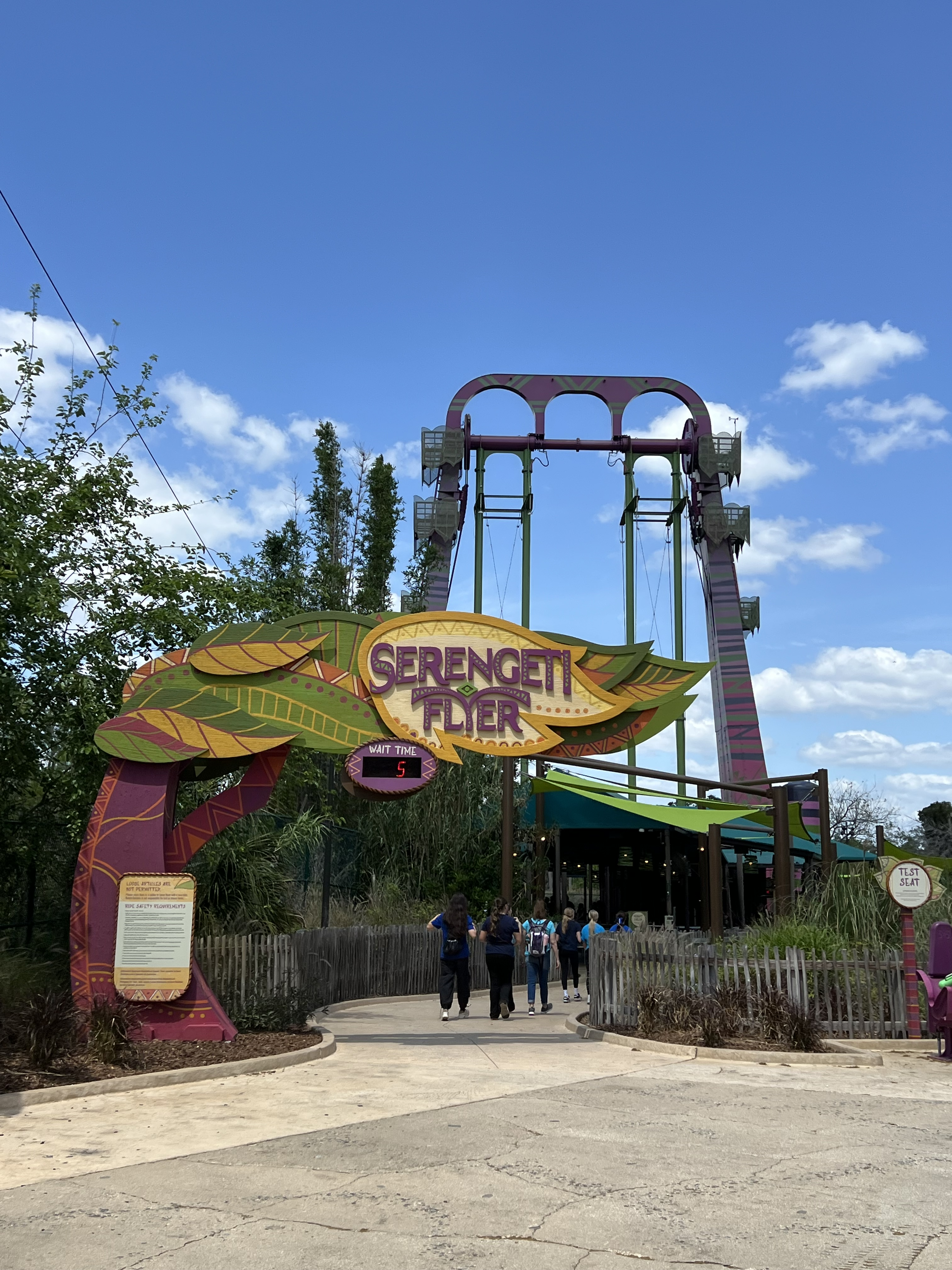
The Serengeti Flyer in March 2025.

- Animal Care Center, a nearly 16,000-square-foot (1,500 m^{2}) attraction, allows visitors the chance to view the Busch Gardens' veterinarians at work in a new state-of-the-art veterinary hospital. The major visitor aspects of the facility include a nutrition demonstration kitchen, treatment rooms, a clinical lab and an interactive diagnostic activity. Behind the scenes, the veterinary hospital also includes the animal nutrition center, animal recovery and holding rooms, and vet offices. The park's former animal care center was located behind the scenes.
- Elephant Interaction Wall, the Nairobi section of the park has three female Asian elephants. They are named Simba, who is 56 years old; Carina, who is 52 years old; and Karnaudi, who is 36 years old. There are daily interactions at the Elephant Interaction and Husbandry Wall or during the Elephant Keeper Experience.
- Serengeti Flyer, a tall, intense S&S Sansei Screamin' Swing that opened in 2023. Initially, in the morning hours, the ride runs “mild mode”, in which it only features half the height and speed, while in the afternoon, it runs “wild mode” in which it reaches its maximum height and speed. However, since late 2023, the ride runs in "wild mode" only.

=== Edge of Africa ===
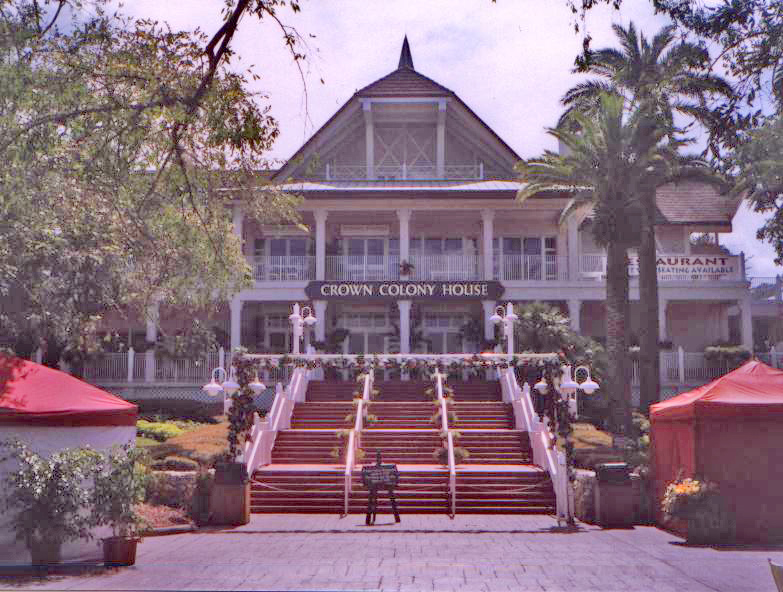
Crown Colony House

Edge of Africa, otherwise known as Cheetah Hunt Plaza, is the smallest section of the park. It features a restaurant, The Serengeti Overlook Restaurant and Pub, the Cheetah Hunt roller coaster, and the Skyride station.

- Cheetah Hunt, an Intamin Blitz coaster that opened in 2011. The roller coaster contains 3 launches, a Windcatcher Tower, and a heartline roll inversion. A suspended monorail, which took guests around the Serengeti Plain, previously occupied Cheetah Hunt's station but had sat empty since the attraction closed in 1999.
- Cheetah Run, an animal exhibit located next to Cheetah Hunt. It replaced the Clydesdale Hamlet. In May 2011, Cheetah Run opened. Cheetah Run is home to Busch Gardens Tampa Bay's collection of cheetahs. There are running demonstrations and Meet a Keeper sessions throughout the day. In addition, the exhibit has interactive screens with cheetah facts. One of Cheetah Run's most notable former residents was Kasi, a male cheetah, who was paired with Mtani, a female Labrador Retriever, from 2011 to 2013 when they were young. Mtani now lives with a zookeeper, and Kasi was paired with a female cheetah. As of 2026, Busch Gardens has 5 cheetahs.

=== Egypt ===
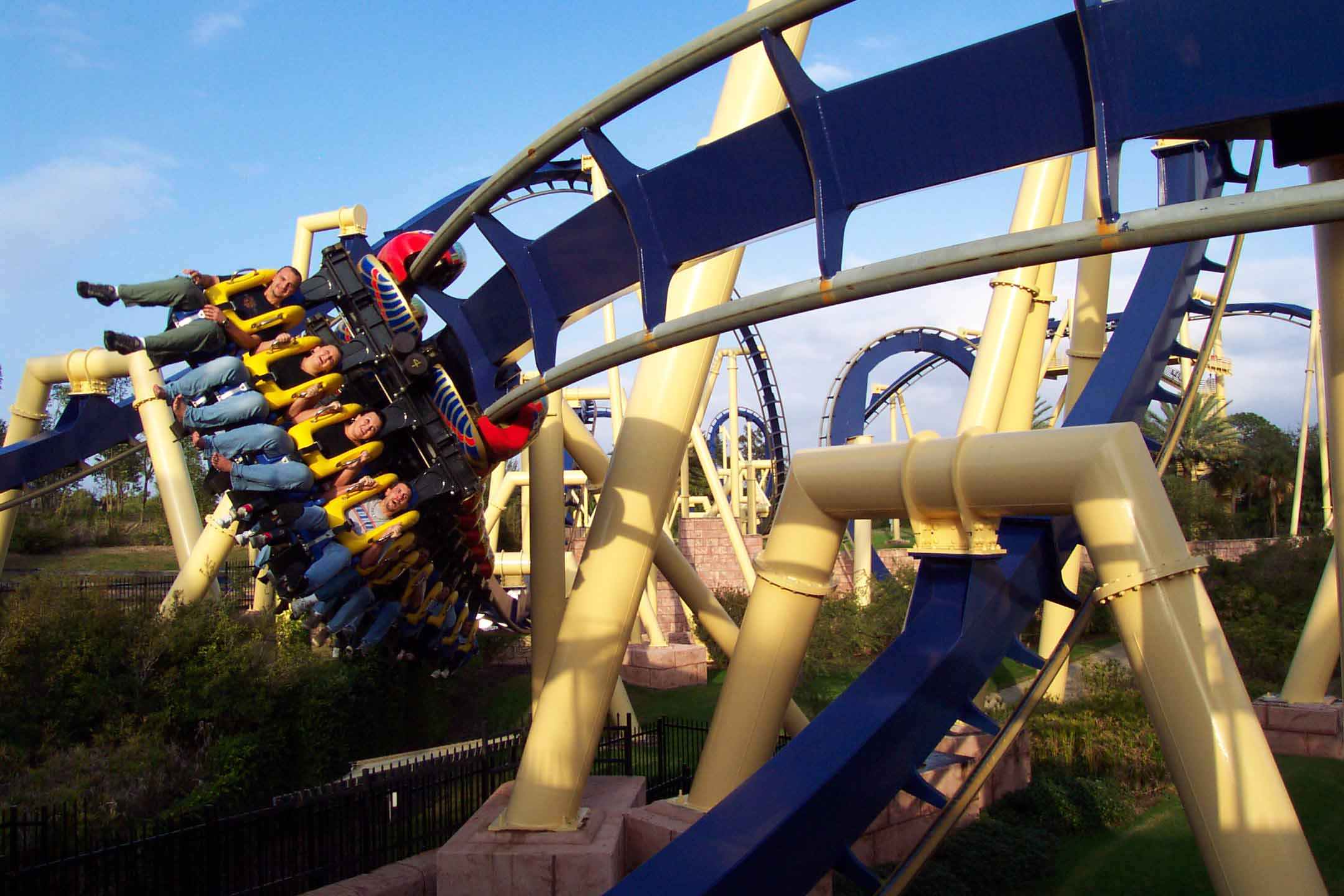
Montu, the fastest and tallest inverted roller coaster upon opening, seen making its way through the last series of corners

Bedouin tents, authentic handicrafts and art create an Egyptian marketplace feel. The primary attraction of the Egypt-themed area is Montu, an inverted steel coaster. Tut's Tomb, a former audio-guided walk-through tomb excavation closed in Winter 2013, and the interior was gutted to make way for the queue for Cobra's Curse. The former Golden Scarab Gift Shop was converted into a gift shop at the exit of the attraction.

- Cobra's Curse, a Mack Rides spinning coaster that replaced Tut's Tomb and opened on June 17, 2016.
- Montu, named after the Egyptian falcon-god of war, a 150-foot (46 m) Bolliger & Mabillard Inverted roller coaster with seven inversions.

== Former attractions ==
=== Rides ===
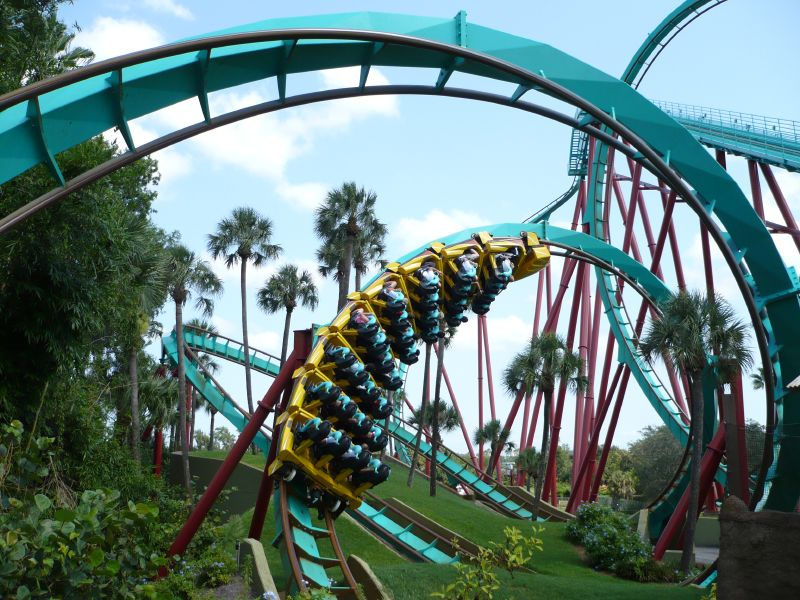
Kumba, a signature roller coaster for the park, closed in 2026.

Name	Manufacturer	Type	Opened	Closed	Replaced by
Stanley Falls Flume	Arrow Development	Log Flume	1973	2025	TBD
Python	Arrow Dynamics	Roller Coaster	1976	2006	Jungala
Scorpion	Anton Schwarzkopf	Roller Coaster	1980	2024	TBD
Phoenix	Intamin	Looping Starship	1984	2018	Phoenix Rising
Tanganyika Tidal Wave	Arrow Dynamics	Shoot-The-Chute	1989	2016	Tigris
Kumba	Bolliger & Mabillard	Roller Coaster	1993	2026	Kumba's Revenge
Gwazi	Great Coasters International	Dueling Wooden Roller Coaster	1999	2015	Converted into a steel-track hybrid roller coaster, Iron Gwazi, opened in 2022
Sand Serpent	Mack Rides	Wild Mouse Roller Coaster	2004	2023	Phoenix Rising

== Animal habitats ==
Busch Gardens is Tampa's largest zoo, with more than 200 species of animals.

=== Animal Care Center ===
Facility that allows visitors to view animal care being conducted, from treatments to X-rays.

- The Wildlife Docs, an Emmy nominated television series that follows animal caretakers treating more than 12,000 different animals living in Busch Gardens Tampa.

=== Bird Gardens ===
A free-flight aviary that shows over 500 tropical birds from around the globe, including parrots, flamingos, and others. The original section of the park opened in 1959. The area, for the most part, remains mostly gardens and animal exhibits. A staple attraction that once stood in this section was the brewery. However, the brewery closed in 1995, and Gwazi now sits where the brewery was located. In 2014, the Bird Gardens theater was demolished, and the outdoor show (Critter Castaways) was relocated inside the Pantopia Theater under the new name "Opening Night Critters". This ran until December 2018. A show showcasing animals that were brought in to a facility and taken to (SeaWorld Entertainment), known as "Rescue Tales", which was already at SeaWorld Orlando, is currently running at the park.

- Walkabout Way, themed as an Australian outpost, opened in June 2010. This area allows guests to hand-feed kangaroos and wallabies, and see animals including kookaburras, magpies, black swans and tawny frogmouths. A male kangaroo, Horatio, arrived at the park in early 2014. This experience is open to all guests 5 years of age or older.
- Lory Landing, an open aviary habitat that invites guests to walk around and be visited by lorikeets. Purchasing nectar is an optional part of the habitat, providing an experience of hand-feeding the birds.

=== Edge of Africa ===
Opened in 1997, Edge of Africa is a walk-through attraction where guests can observe African animals. Among the exhibits are a Nile crocodile named Sobek; meerkats; a coalition of lions named Henri, Herman, Hugo, Lou, and Pascal; two spotted hyenas named Dazi and Cazi; three hippos named Moyo, Kita, and Devi; and a troop of ring-tailed lemurs.

The hippos Moyo and Kita are never exhibited together, being father and daughter, and being unaware of this would try to mate with each other. Therefore, both are rotated into the exhibit and holding area day by day to avoid accidental inbreeding.

=== The Serengeti Plain ===
In 1965, the park opened its Serengeti Plain animal habitat, the first of its kind to offer animals in a free-roaming environment. Over the years, the habitat has expanded from 29 acres (12 ha) to its current size of 65 acres (26 ha). It is home to the Grévy's zebra, Grant's zebra, Grant's gazelle, Thomson's gazelle, sable antelope, reticulated giraffe, Ankole-Watusi, addax, waterbuck, greater kudu, southern white rhinoceros, common eland, impala, common ostrich, and lowland nyala. A secluded area of this region is home to a solitary female eastern black rhinoceros named Jody.

== Events ==
From January to March, Busch Gardens hosts a weekly concert series which invites popular bands either in big band music or pop to perform classic or contemporary songs.

(Previously called Bud & BBQ and Bands, Brew & BBQ) For the months of March & April, Busch Gardens hosts a series of concerts in Gwazi Field, mostly from classic rock and country music acts. Sometimes the event includes alternative rock, pop, hip hop and R&B acts as well as comedians. Also, there are special culinary offerings that include a variety of ethnic food and wine samplings from various local vendors along the walkway from the Gwazi Roller Coaster to the gate in Gwazi Field. The documentary film Blackfish and a subsequent online petition led to several popular musical groups cancelling performances at SeaWorld and Busch Gardens' "Bands, Brew & BBQ" event in 2014. This caused the removal of the event in Tampa, which was replaced by the annual Food and Wine Festival, resembling the one currently at Epcot in Walt Disney World Orlando. In March, several Latin music acts are hosted on the stage in Gwazi Field. There is a similar culinary setup with special offerings for the concert days as there is for Bands, Brew & BBQ. During summer months, the park stays open later and includes concerts by performers like David Cassidy and Starship with Mickey Thomas. The park's Independence Day festivities add fireworks to the entertainment lineup.

In 2010, Busch Gardens added a new nighttime show called Kinetix, the first special effect-heavy show put on in Gwazi Field. Also, they added many new special effects (i.e., Strobe, Lighting, Fog) to the existing rides just for the Summer Nights season. Kinetix discontinued after the 2016 Summer Nights. Since 2017, Busch Gardens Summer Nights now includes party zones where guests can dance with Party Starters and DJs to the music and compete for special prizes. The major party zones are ¡Fiesta Festa! in the Cheetah Hunt Plaza and Tigris's Party Zone (formally Viben Village) in Stanleyville. On every Friday, Saturday, and Sunday night, guests can compete in the "Dance Challenge" at Gwazi Park to win four free tickets to Adventure Island as well as a fireworks show directly afterward. In 2022, Busch Gardens Summer Nights was officially renamed to "Busch Gardens Summer Celebration," following general renovations to the park.

Every September and October since 2000, Busch Gardens is transformed into Howl-O-Scream. This event contains haunted houses, scare zones, and shows. Howl-O-Scream is one of the top-rated Halloween events in the United States. Howl-O-Scream has featured some attractions of the park turned into "horrified" attractions at night. This includes Serengeti Safari Tours, which was turned into Evening Serengeti Safari Tours, and Curiosity Caverns, which was turned into Dark Cavern, both in 2000. In 2012, Howl-O-Scream celebrated 13 "unlucky" years.

From November to December, theaters throughout the park are transformed into Christmas-themed shows (Like Christmas On Ice in the Moroccan Palace) in celebration of the holiday season for an event called Christmas Town. The park is decorated with over a million Christmas lights and theming. At Snow World, guests may play in snow and ride down ice slides. This event was first introduced in 2012. At Santa's House, guests may bring their little ones and have pictures taken with Santa Claus, Mrs. Claus, and Santa's Elves next to the Nairobi Train Station, which circles around the Serengeti Plain as the Christmas Town Sing Along Train featuring select Christmas carols and songs. Guests may also meet the stars from Rudolph the Red-Nosed Reindeer over in Rudolph's Winter Wonderland since 2016. Two Christmas Town princesses can be spotted in the Icy Forest (Ice Princess) and the poinsettia trees (Poinsettia Princess), where guests can also have pictures taken. Princess Fae, a sugarplum princess, made her debut during the 2019 Christmas Town season. The poinsettia, sugarplum, and icy princesses can also be seen together there near closing time.

During New Year's Eve, Busch Gardens celebrates the new year by hosting live music throughout the park, thrill rides open through the night, and fireworks located at the Gwazi Field. Including a park-wide countdown to the new year.

== Awards and recognition ==
=== Rankings ===
The following is a list of roller coasters at Busch Gardens Tampa that have placed on Amusement Today's award or nomination list, along with the highest ranking and year awarded or nominated. Busch Gardens Tampa has also been nominated for best landscaping in 1998 and 2007.

==== Steel ====
- Montu: 2 (1999)
- Kumba: 4 (1998)
- SheiKra: 13 (2006)
- Cheetah Hunt: 29 (2011)
- Iron Gwazi: 29 (2022)

==== Wood ====
- Gwazi: 40 (2007)

=== Attendance ===
Year	Attendance
2008	4,128,000
2009	4,100,000
2010	4,200,000
2011	4,284,000
2012	4,348,000
2013	4,087,000
2014	4,128,000
2015	4,252,000
2016	4,169,000
2017	3,961,000
2018	4,139,000
2019	4,180,000
2020	1,288,000
2021	3,210,000
2022	4,051,000
2023	4,000,000

== See also ==
- Florida tourism industry
- Incidents at SeaWorld parks
- SeaWorld San Antonio
- SeaWorld San Diego
- Sesame Place (Pennsylvania)
