= Rhino Rally =

Attraction at Busch Gardens Tampa Bay (2001–14)

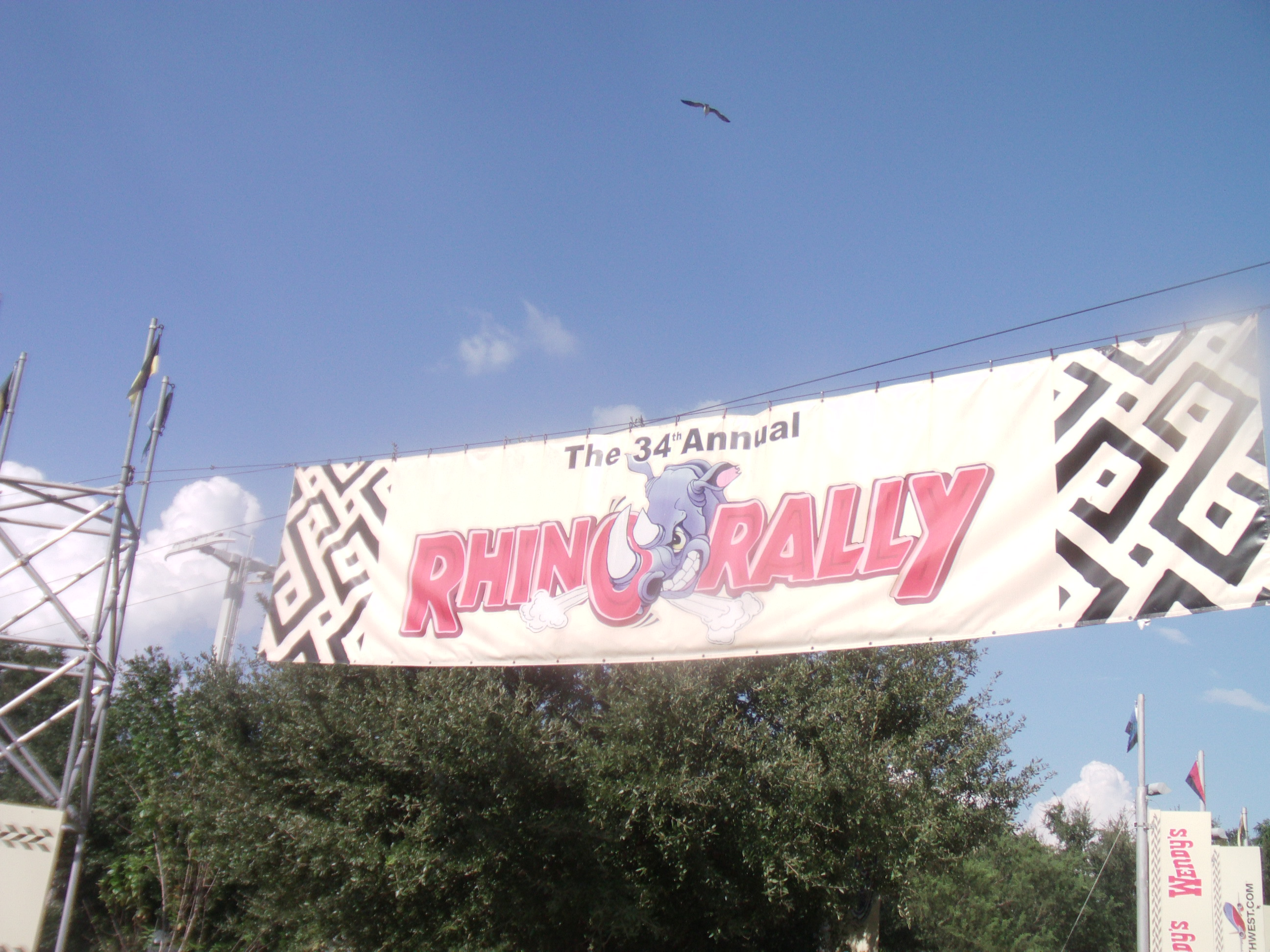

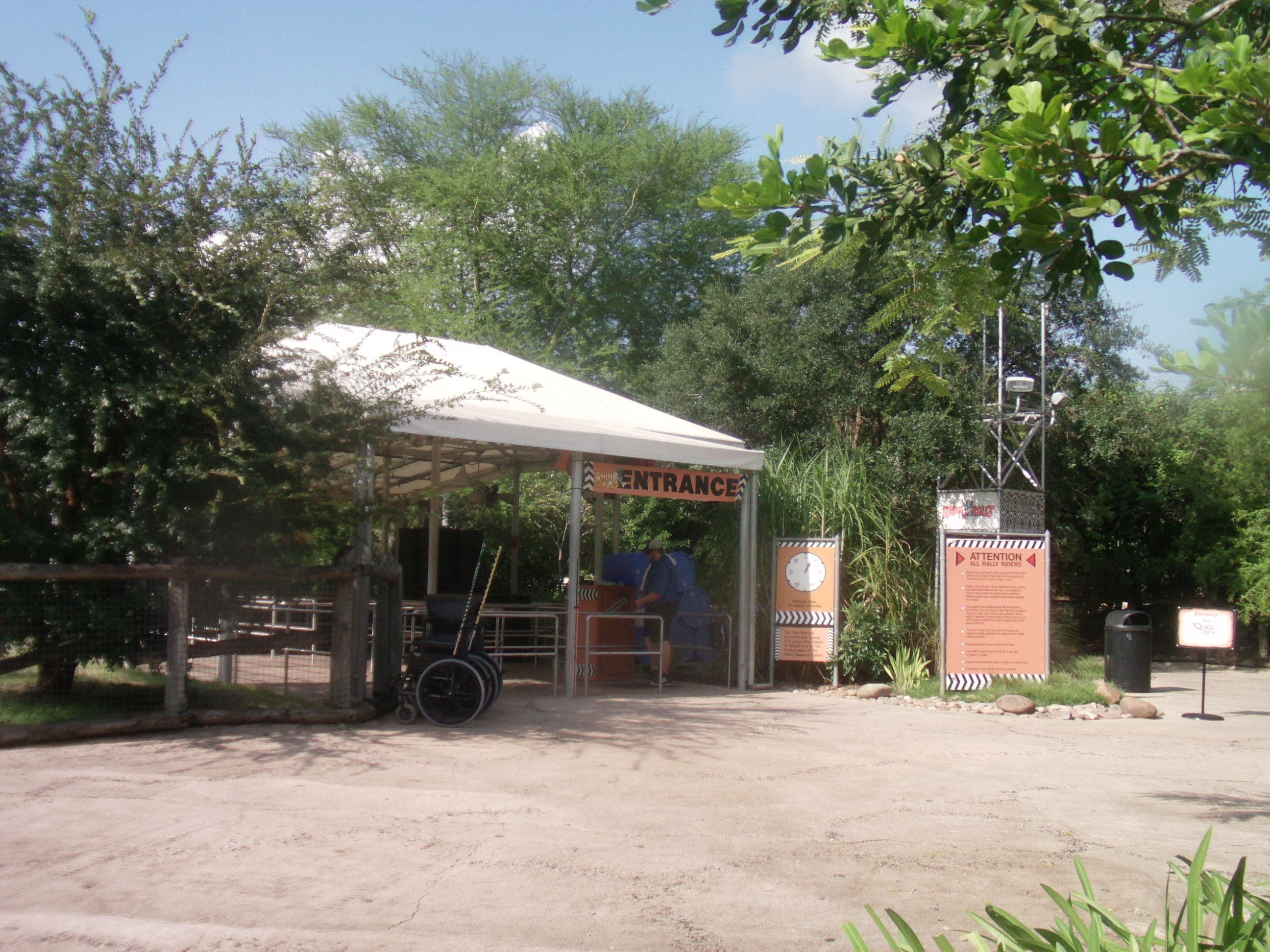

Busch Gardens Tampa Bay
- Area: Nairobi
- Coordinates: 28.0357°N 82.4223°W
- Status: Removed
- Opening date: May 23, 2001
- Closing date: September 1, 2014
- Replaced by: Serengeti Flyer

Ride statistics
- Attraction type: Safari ride
- Manufacturer: Vekoma
- Theme: Safari

Rhino Rally was a safari-themed attraction located at Busch Gardens Tampa Bay, a theme park located in Tampa, Florida. The ride was opened on May 23, 2001, in the Nairobi section of the park and lasts between 5 and 6 minutes. The ride was closed on September 1, 2014, due to consistent maintenance issues. The pretense of the attraction was that guests are going on a normal safari ride which turns into a search for a lost driver named Scooter Roberts.

== History ==
Busch Gardens Tampa Bay announced Rhino Rally on May 11, 2000, a safari-themed attraction utilizing land rovers and a river ride section. The announcement took place with a presentation by Jack Hanna. In March 2001, the park was finishing up construction of the attraction and on March 20, 2001, a media ride-through was held. The ride officially opened on May 23, 2001 to the general public.

The attraction's enormous wait times following the opening prompted the park to begin a temporary "express" style system which would allow the buyer to re-visit the attraction at a later time and receive front-of-the-line access. This was later discontinued in 2002.

The ride originally featured a larger water portion which was part of the ride from May 23, 2001, until May 1, 2010.

As of May 1, 2010 the water portion of Rhino Rally was closed permanently for construction of Cheetah Hunt, and the theme of the ride changed to rescuing a lost driver named Scooter Roberts.

The water section of the ride was plagued with problems, often causing it to break down. When this happened, the land portion of the route operated as normal, but with a detour towards the end of the ride. If the navigator said to go left, the driver would go right instead. This was the only time that the vehicles went to the right at the split in the paths until the water portion's closure in 2010, resulting in the vehicles only going in the direction of the right side path.

In January 2015, Busch Gardens confirmed speculation Rhino Rally would close permanently. The area of the park that the ride was located in was subsequently used for Serengeti Flyer, an S&S Screamin' Swing.

== Characteristics ==
The attraction was built on 16 acres (6.5 ha) of land in the Nairobi section of the park. The water portion of the ride was manufactured by Vekoma.

== Incidents ==
In June 2001, one of the cars flipped over during the ride while the driver was crossing over a narrow path in the track while reportedly "acting goofy". The incident resulted in minor injuries to some guests, two of whom were taken to a local hospital. Busch Gardens later shut down the ride for a lengthy refurbishment in order to make the ride's pathways wider, and to re-design the ride vehicles.

== See also ==
- Kilimanjaro Safaris, a similar safari ride at Disney's Animal Kingdom
