= SkyRide (Busch Gardens Tampa Bay) =

Gondola lift in Busch Gardens Tampa Bay

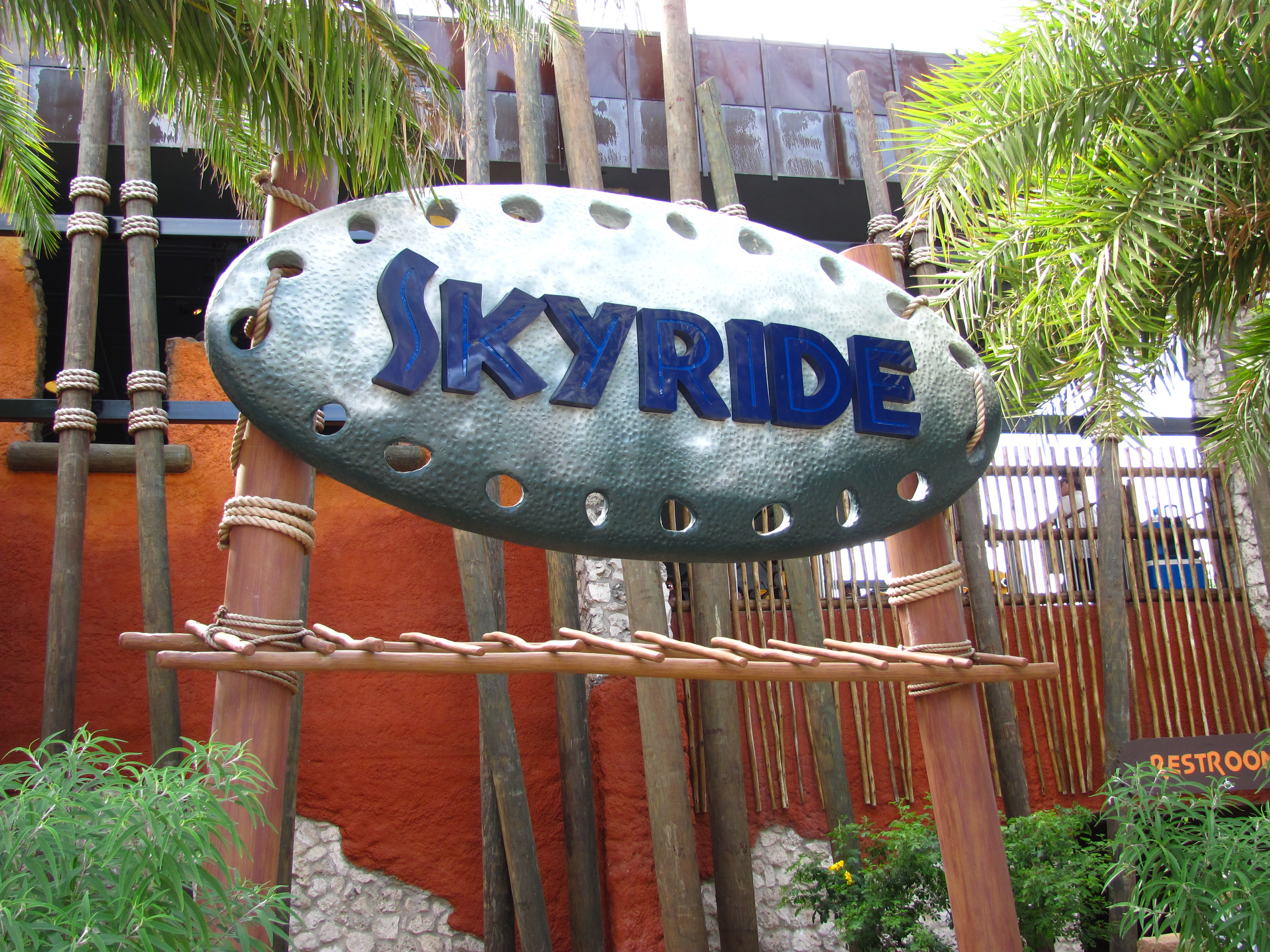
- The entrance to SkyRide at Busch Gardens Tampa Bay in 2012

Busch Gardens Tampa Bay
- Opening date: 1974

Ride statistics
- Attraction type: Gondola lift
- Manufacturer: Von Roll
- Designer: SeaWorld Parks and Entertainment
- Height: 60 ft (18 m)
- Speed: 3 mph (4.8 km/h)
- Riders per vehicle: 4
- Duration: 5:54
- This is a pay-per-use attraction

SkyRide is a transportation attraction at Busch Gardens Tampa Bay in Tampa, Florida. It carries passengers from the Edge of Africa section of the park to the Stanleyville section or vice versa. During this experience, passengers get a bird's-eye view of several attractions at the park.

== History ==
The ride was manufactured by Von Roll of Berne, Switzerland and opened at the park in 1974. The SkyRide needed to be closed beginning in 2010 to build the Cheetah Hunt roller coaster, which opened May 27, 2011. It was reopened shortly after that date.

The boarding building at the former Crown Colony (now known as Cheetah Hunt Plaza, or Cheetah Plaza) section was renovated at this point, in order to aid it in fitting better with the new subsahran Africa theme (in contrast with the former colonial Africa theme).

== Ride experience ==
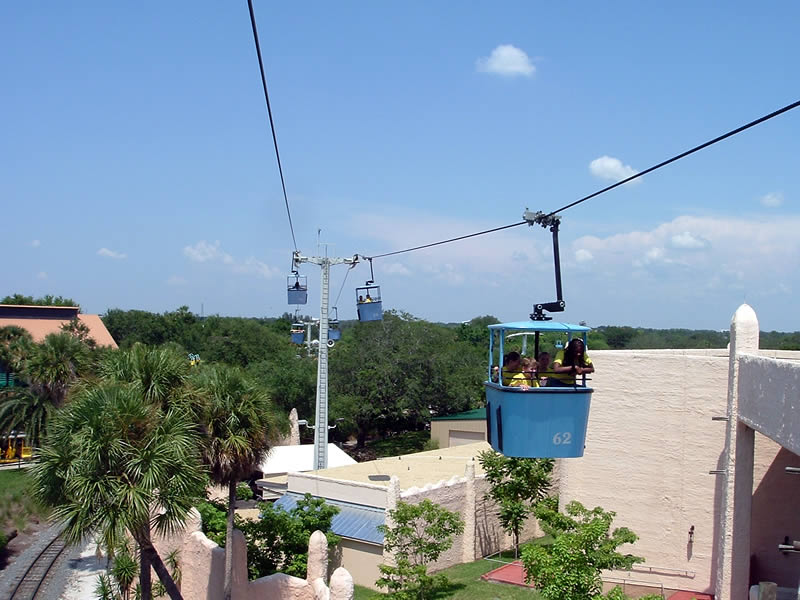
A view from one of the dozens of gondolas running on SkyRide at any given time.

The following is an account of the ride from the Cheetah Hunt station to the Stanleyville station (observances while on the return trip would be in reverse order):

Passengers enter a cabin at the Cheetah Hunt station. It is at this station that an enormous motor—or series of motors—powers the movement of the continuous cable for the entire ride. The vehicle catches onto the cable and the cabin begins its first ascent. For the first half of the attraction, the cabin passes over the animal area of the park, including the "Edge of Africa" and "Nairobi" sections of the park. During this portion, passengers can see various animals to one side, and such attractions as Iron Gwazi and SheiKra on the other side. The cabin then descends to a checkpoint structure where a total of three giant wheels, similar to those at each station, change the direction of the cable. It is here that two employees (one monitoring the vehicles going in each direction) ensure that the cabins have enough momentum to carry themselves across the steel tracks above while making the 90-degree turn. The cabin then returns to the cable and begins its second—and final—ascent, now going perpendicular to the first half of the attraction. During the second portion, passengers can see Phoenix Rising, the Timbuktu Theater and Stanley Falls Flume to one side, and Kumba to the other side. The cabin then descends to a station at the opposite end of the park, where existing passengers exit the ride and new passengers board the gondolas for the return trip to the front of the park.

== Characteristics ==
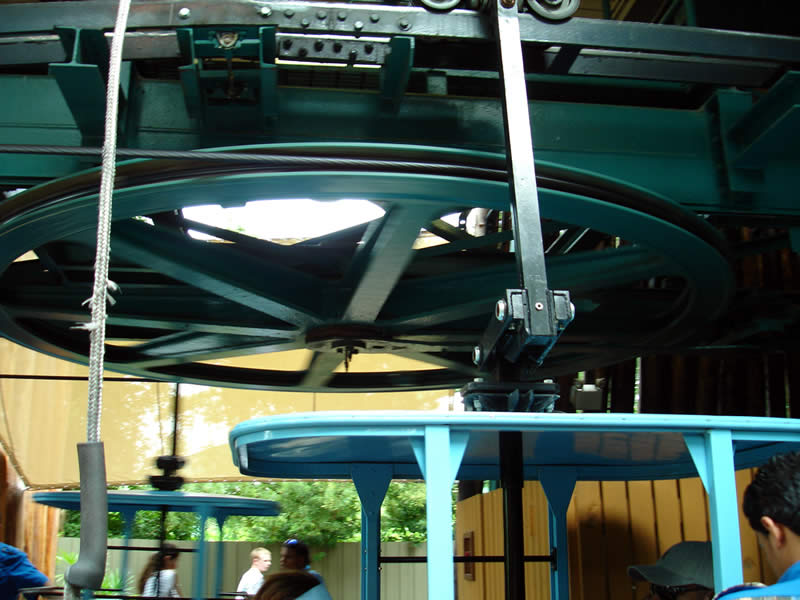
The bullwheel at the Stanleyville station

The ride consists of a single continuous cable, held up by evenly dispersed supports. From this moving cable, dozens of cabins hang, each one carrying up to four passengers (or 680 pounds). These are open cabins with four seats (two rows of two, facing each other). At each station (one at Cheetah Hunt Plaza, one at Stanleyville), a large wheel with a pulley-like groove rotates the direction in which the cable is moving. Incoming cabins are transferred from the moving cable to a stationary steel track, along which the wheels of each cabin glide. They are brought to a stop by two park employees. While one holds the vehicle in place, the other opens the cabin door as the passengers exit. The door is then closed and the vehicle is thrust around the turn. On the other side of the large wheel, another employee re-opens the door and new passengers enter the cabin. The door is re-locked and the cabin is pushed hard enough to transfer it from the steel track to the moving cable. Once on the cable, the wheels above each cabin are not used, but the cable transporting it rests within a slot between the wheels.

- Gondola – The Cabin that guests ride on the SkyRide. Each gondola weighs 485 lb (220 kg) and can carry up to 680 lb (310 kg) in passengers. According to the law, no more than 4 people may be in the gondola while riding, including infants. As well, three adults per gondola. Due to the design of the gondola, the heaviest guest must be seated on the far side of the gondola, away from the door.
- Drive Station – The station where the mechanical drive of the ride is held. This is also the main area where guests are loaded and unloaded from. The Barn is also located here.
- Mid Station – The station where the 14-short-ton (13 t) counterweight of the ride is held. At one time, passengers got off at this station for the Treetops Restaurant while it was in business. Today, passengers don’t get on or off from the Mid station.
- Tension Station – The station where guests unload at Stanleyville or Jungala.

== Incidents ==
- On July 19, 2009, employee and USF player Maikon Bonani fell 35 feet (11 m) from the ride.
