= CityPASS =

American tourism company

- Industry: Travel
- Founded: June 1997 by Mike Gallagher and Mike Morey
- Headquarters: CityPASS; 27 Arrow Root Lane; Victor, Idaho 83455
- Products: Atlanta CityPASS; Boston CityPASS; Chicago CityPASS; Dallas CityPass; Denver CityPASS; Houston CityPASS; Los Angeles CityPASS; New York CityPASS; New York C3; Orlando CityPASS; Philadelphia CityPASS; San Antonio CityPASS; San Diego CityPASS; San Francisco CityPASS; San Francisco C3; Seattle CityPASS; Southern California CityPASS; Tampa Bay CityPASS; Toronto CityPASS
- Website: www.citypass.com

CityPASS (formerly styled as "CityPass") is an American company that produces and sells discounted ticket packages to top tourist attractions in various North American metropolitan areas. The company's headquarters is located in Victor, Idaho.

== Description ==
CityPASS is a privately held company that produces and sells discounted ticket packages (discounted from the regular admission prices) to groups of attractions in various metropolitan areas, including Atlanta, Boston, Chicago, Dallas, Denver, Houston, Los Angeles, New York City, Orlando, Philadelphia, San Antonio, San Diego, San Francisco, Seattle, Southern California, Tampa Bay, and Toronto. Once travelers have purchased CityPASS tickets, they pay no additional fees to get into any of the included attractions.

The company chooses a select group of attractions within each city or region and then, working in cooperation with the attractions and the respective destinations, sells the ticket packages directly to consumers. For the destinations, being included in the CityPASS program is a way to position their city as an affordable option to potential visitors.

The price of a CityPASS tickets are generally up to 50 percent less than the combined cost of purchasing the included tickets individually. Southern California CityPASS tickets save about 30 percent on admission to four major theme parks: Disneyland, Disney California Adventure Park, Legoland California and SeaWorld San Diego, with the option of adding the San Diego Zoo or Safari Park for an additional cost.

== Company history ==
The company's founders, Mike Gallagher and Mike Morey, now serve as its co-chairmen. Gallagher's career includes various marketing, operations and executive positions at SeaWorld San Diego, the San Diego Zoo and Marine World Africa USA (now Six Flags Discovery Kingdom). Morey is the founder and former owner of Morey & Associates, a market research and consulting firm whose clients include museums, aquariums and zoos.

In June 1997, the CityPASS program was launched simultaneously in Seattle and San Francisco.

CityPASS ticket packages for other destinations followed:

- 1998 – New York and Boston
- 1999 – Philadelphia
- 2000 – Chicago
- 2003 – Southern California (Disneyland, Disney California Adventure Park, Legoland California and SeaWorld San Diego)
- 2004 – Toronto
- 2006 – Atlanta
- 2008 – Houston
- 2014 – Tampa Bay
- 2015 – Dallas
- 2016 – New York C3
- 2018 – Denver
- 2018 – San Francisco C3
- 2019 – Orlando CityPASS
- 2021 – San Diego CityPASS
- 2023 – San Antonio CityPASS
- 2024 – Los Angeles CityPASS

In January 2010, the company changed the styling of its consumer name from "CityPass" to "CityPASS." Both versions of the name are trademarked.
