= Ray of light (disambiguation) =

Ray of light is an abstract model of light used in optics.

Ray of light may also refer to:

- Light beam, a directional projection of light

== Music ==
- Ray of Light, a 1998 album by Madonna
  - "Ray of Light" (song)
- Ray of Light (Michael Wong album) (2002)
- Ray of Light (Tina Guo album) (2014)
- "Rays of Light" (song), by Broiler (2004)

== Other uses ==
- A Ray of Light, a 1960 Spanish musical film starring Marisol
- The Ray of Light, painting in the Louvre, Paris
- Ray of Light (sculpture), a public artwork in Redwood City, California
- Ray of Light Theatre, a musical theatre company in San Francisco, California
- Ray of Light Foundation, an American non-profit organization
- Rayito de luz, a 2000 Mexican childhood telenovela
- Theekkathir (lit. 'Ray of Light'), a newspaper of the Communist Party of India (Marxist)

== See also ==
- Sunray (disambiguation)
