= Sunlight (disambiguation) =

Sunlight is the total spectrum of the electromagnetic radiation given off by the Sun.

Sunlight may also refer to:

== Places ==
- Sunlight, Missouri, US, an unincorporated community
- Sunlight, West Virginia, US, an unincorporated community
- Sunlight Peak, a mountain in Colorado
- Sunlight Peak (Wyoming), a mountain
- Sunlight Ski Area, a ski area near Glenwood Springs, Colorado

== Arts and entertainment ==
- Sunlight (Benson), a 1909 painting by Frank Weston Benson
- John Sunlight, a fictional nemesis of Doc Savage
- Sunlight, a 1913 short film starring Francis X. Bushman
- Sunlight (film), a 2024 British comedy film

=== Music ===
- Sunlight Studio, a recording studio in Stockholm, Sweden

==== Albums ====
- Sunlight (Herbie Hancock album) or the title song, 1978
- Sunlight (Nicky Byrne album) or the title song (see below), 2016
- Sunlight (Spacey Jane album), 2020
- Sunlight, by the Youngbloods, 1971

==== Songs ====
- "Sunlight" (DJ Antoine song), 2011
- "Sunlight" (DJ Sammy song), 2002
- "Sunlight" (The Magician song), 2014
- "Sunlight" (Modestep song), 2011
- "Sunlight" (Nicky Byrne song), 2016
- "Sunlight", by Bag Raiders from Bag Raiders, 2010
- "Sunlight", by Deas Vail from Birds and Cages, 2010
- "Sunlight", by Diana Vickers, a B-side of the single "Once", 2010
- "Sunlight", by Hozier from Wasteland, Baby!, 2019
- "Sunlight", by Oh Land from Family Tree, 2019
- "Sunlight", by TheFatRat and Phaera, 2019
- "Sunlight", by Tune-Yards from Bird-Brains, 2009
- "Sunlight", written by Jesse Colin Young, released by the Youngbloods on Elephant Mountain, 1969, and covered by Three Dog Night on Naturally, 1970
- "The Sunlight" by Janis Ian from Present Company, 1971

== Sports ==
- Sunlight (horse) (foaled 2015), an Australian Thoroughbred racehorse
- Sunlight Park, a one-time baseball park in Toronto, Ontario, Canada

== Transport ==
- SS Sunlight, originally SS Empire Balfour, a refrigerated cargo ship for the Pan-Norse Steamship Company 1962–1967
- Sunair Sunlight, a German ultralight electric trike aircraft

== Other uses ==
- Sunlight (cleaning product), a brand of laundry soap
- Sunlight Foundation, a foundation for promoting online government transparency
- Sunlight House, an art deco office building in Manchester, England
- Joseph Sunlight (1889–1978), Russian-English architect

== See also ==
- Daylight (disambiguation)
- Sun (disambiguation)
- Sun Ray (disambiguation)
- Sunshine (disambiguation)
