= Theatrical smoke and fog =

Atmospheric effects used in the entertainment industry

Theatrical smoke and fog, also known as special effect smoke, fog or haze, is a category of atmospheric effects used in the entertainment industry. The use of fog can be found throughout motion picture and television productions, live theatre, concerts, at nightclubs and raves, amusement and theme parks, and even in video arcades and similar venues. These atmospheric effects are used for creating special effects, to make lighting and lighting effects visible, and to create a specific sense of mood or atmosphere. Recently, smaller, cheaper fog machines have become available to the general public, and fog effects are becoming more common in residential applications, from small house parties to Halloween and Christmas.

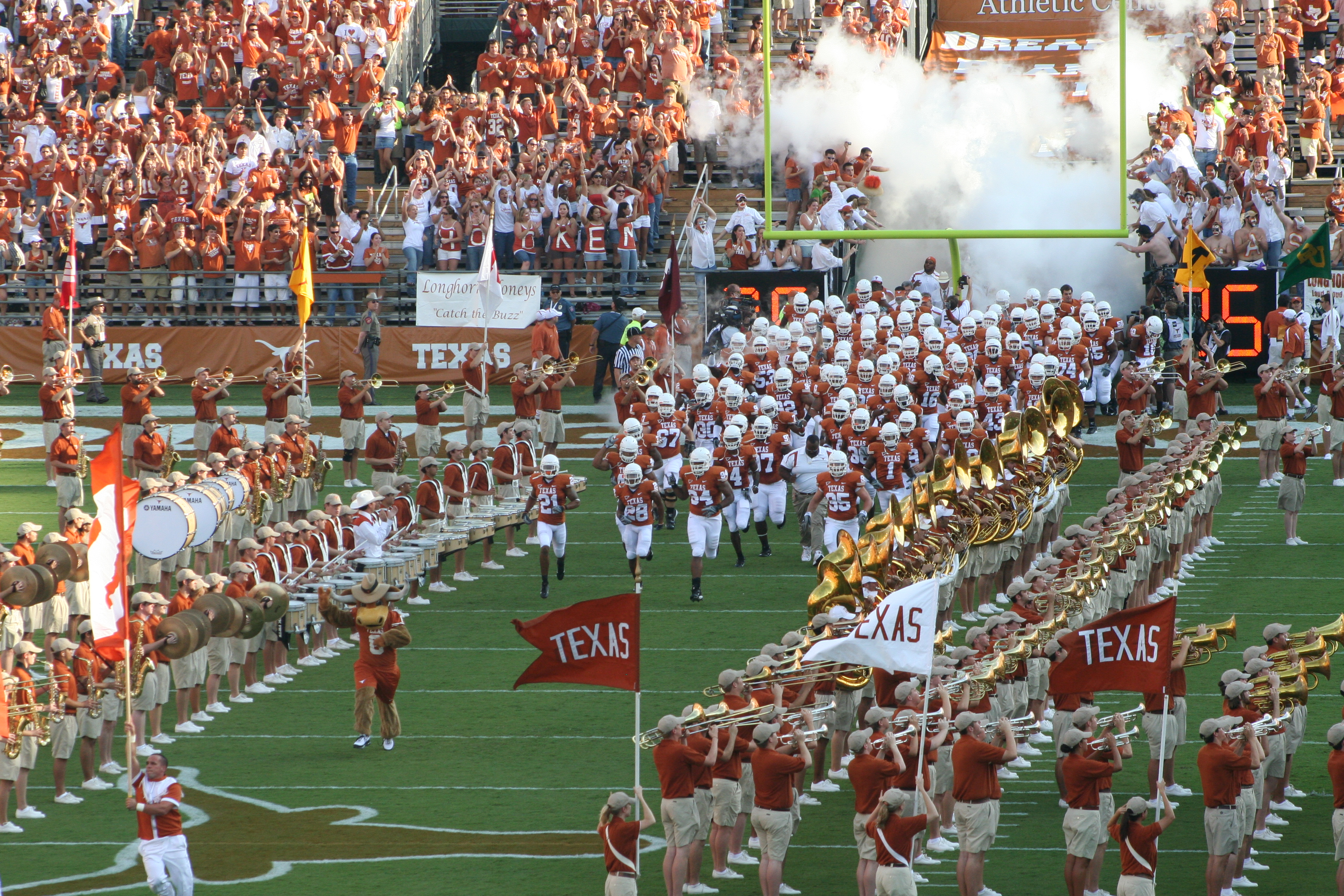
Fog is used for dramatic effect as the 2007 Texas Longhorns football team enters the field of play.

Theatrical fog and theatrical fog machines are also becoming more prevalent in industrial applications outside of the entertainment industry, due to their ease of use, inherent portability, and ruggedness. Common popular applications for theatrical fog include environmental testing (such as HVAC inspections) as well as emergency personnel and disaster response training exercises.

Militaries have historically used smoke and fog to mask troop movements in training and combat, the techniques of which are technologically similar to those used in theatre and film.

Health harms can be caused by short- and long-term exposure to artificial fogs. Some types of fog are less healthy than others. Handling the generating equipment also has health risks.

== Types of effects ==
There are generally 4 types of fog effects used in entertainment applications: smoke, fog, haze, and "low-lying" effects.

=== Smoke ===
Smoke effects refer to theatrical atmospheric effects produced either by pyrotechnic materials, such as Smoke Cookies, and pre-fabricated smoke cartridges; or other flammable substances such as incense or HVAC smoke pencils or pens.

Smoke is differentiated from other atmospheric effects in that it is composed of solid particles released during combustion, rather than the liquid droplets that fog or haze are composed of.

=== Fog ===
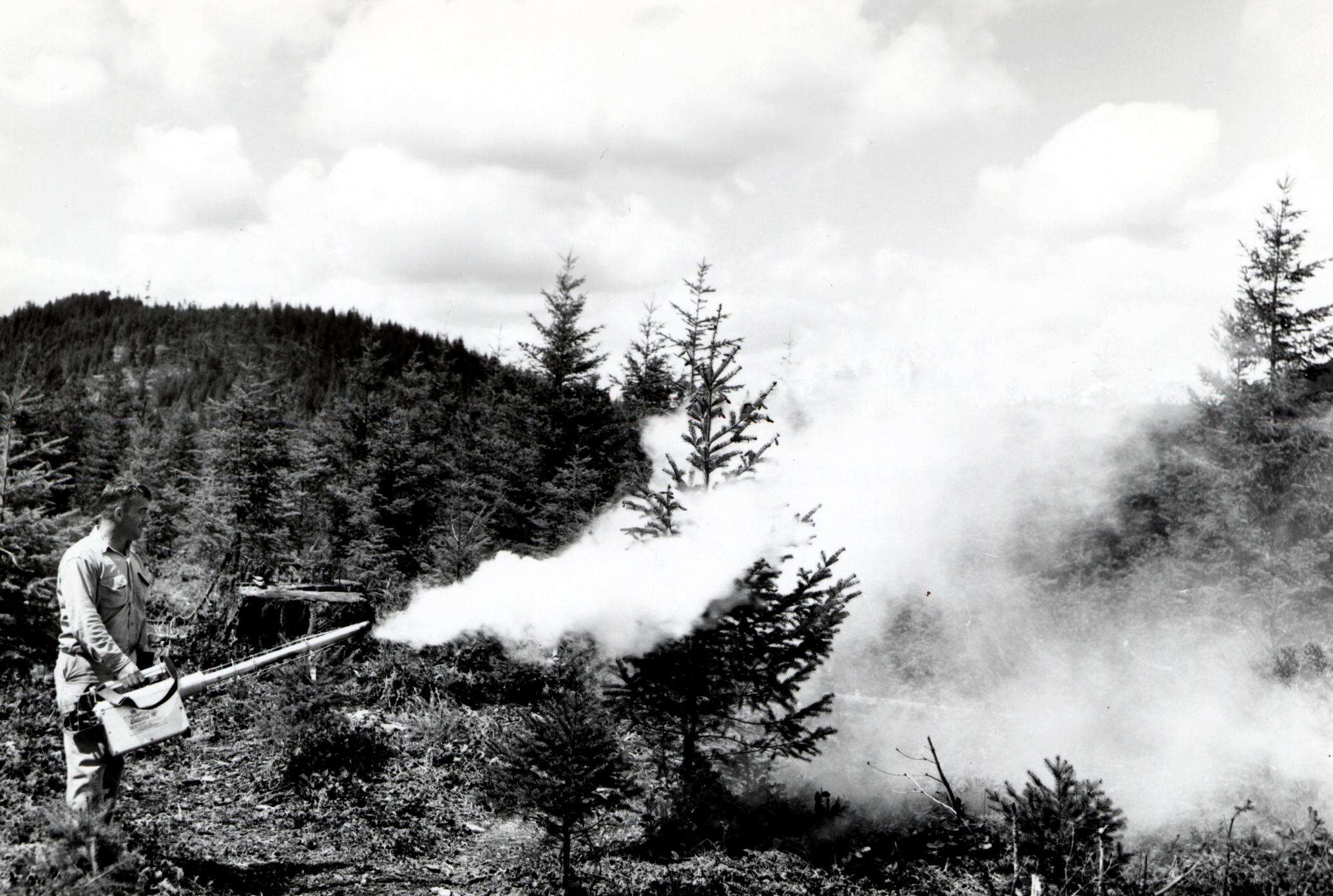
1962. Virgil Allen testing Dynafog Model 70 fog machine used for pest control. Machine has a jet engine and disseminates only oil-based material. Olympic National Forest, Washington

Fog is created by pumping one of a variety of different glycols (such as propylene glycol, triethylene glycol, and glycerol) or glycol/water mixtures (referred to as fog fluid) into a heat exchanger (essentially a block of metal with a resistance heating element in it) and heating until the fluid vaporises, creating a thick translucent or opaque cloud. Devices specifically manufactured for this purpose are referred to as fog machines.

An obsolete method for creating theatrical fog on-stage (although the technique is still used in motion pictures) is to use a device known as a thermal fogger, initially designed for distributing pesticide, which aspirates a petroleum product (typically kerosene or propane), ignites the fuel to create a flame, and then heats a mixture of air and pesticide to create a dense fog. This technique is similar to the smoke generators used by military forces to create smoke screens, and is generally only used outdoors due to the volume of fog produced and the petroleum fuel required. For theatrical purposes, the pesticide is typically replaced with glycol, glycol/water mixtures, or water.

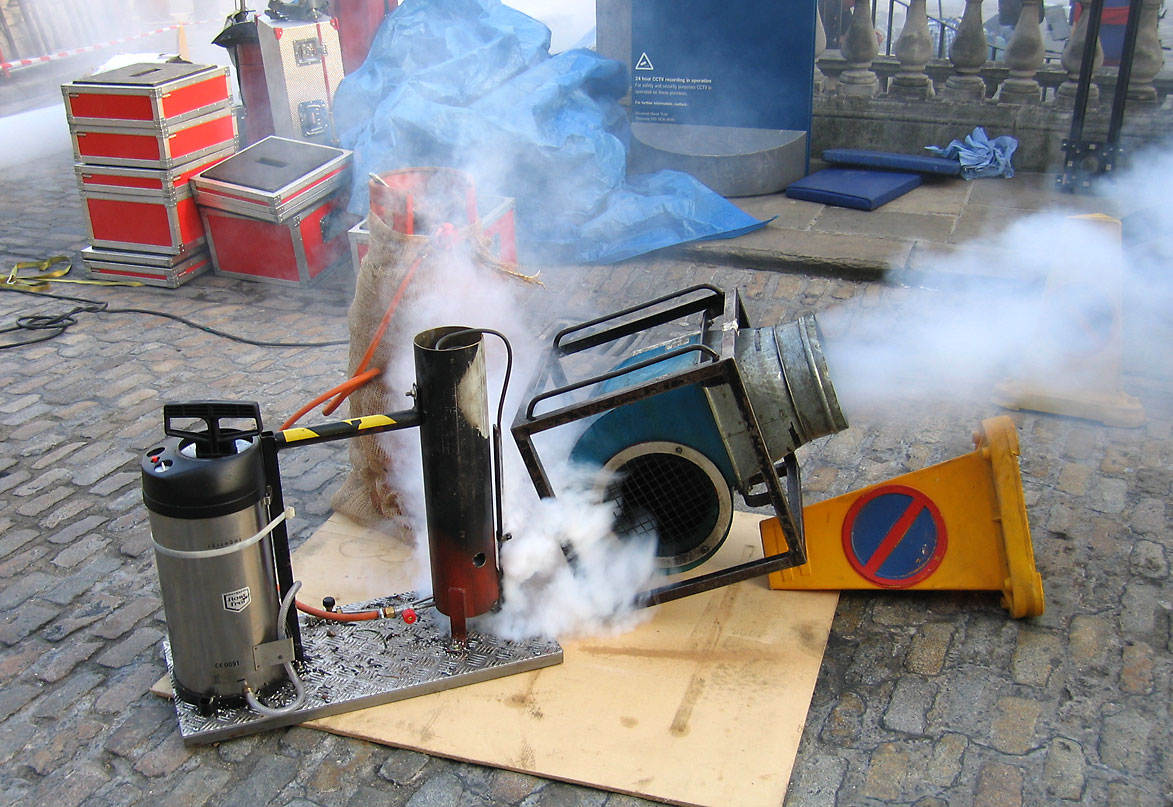
A thermal fogger and fan on a movie set

"Low-lying" fog effects can be created by combining a fog machine with another device designed specifically for this purpose. As the fog exits the fog machine, it is chilled, either by passing through a device containing a fan and ice, or by passing through a device containing a fan and compressor similar to an air conditioner. The result is a relatively thick fog that stays within a few feet of the ground. As the fog warms, or is agitated, it rises and dissipates. Several manufacturers of theatrical fog fluid have developed specially formulated mixtures specifically designed to be used with CO_{2}, intended to provide thicker, more consistent fog effects. Although these chilling devices do not use carbon dioxide, the specially formulated fog fluid does create denser fog than regular fog fluid.

=== Haze ===
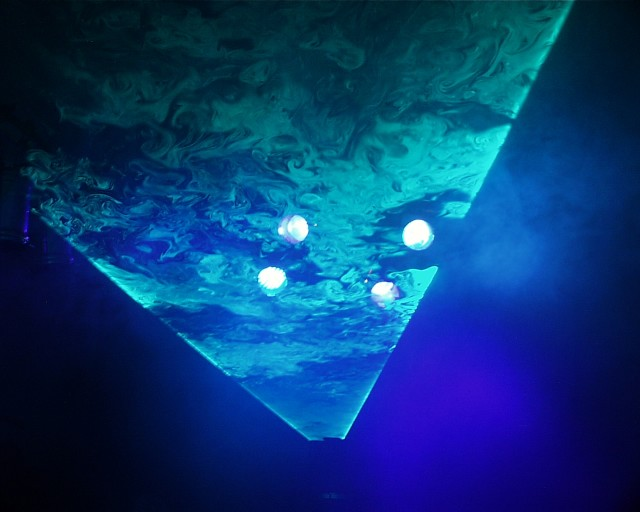
A laser passing through haze

Haze effects refer to creating an unobtrusive, homogeneous cloud intended primarily to reveal lighting beams, such as "light fingers" in a rock concert. This effect is produced using a haze machine, typically done in one of two ways. One technique uses mineral oil, atomized via a spray pump powered either by electricity or compressed CO_{2}, breaking the mineral oil into a fine mist. Another technique for creating haze uses a glycol/water mixture to create haze in a process nearly identical to that for creating fog effects. In either case, the fluid used is referred to as haze fluid, but the different formulations are not compatible or interchangeable. Glycol/water haze fluid is sometimes referred to as "water-based haze" to avoid ambiguity.

Smaller volumes of haze can also be generated from aerosol canisters containing mineral oil under pressure. Although the density of haze generated and the volume of space that can be filled is significantly smaller than that of a haze machine, aerosol canisters have the advantages of portability, no requirements for electricity, and finer control over the volume of haze generated.

=== Carbon dioxide and dry ice ===
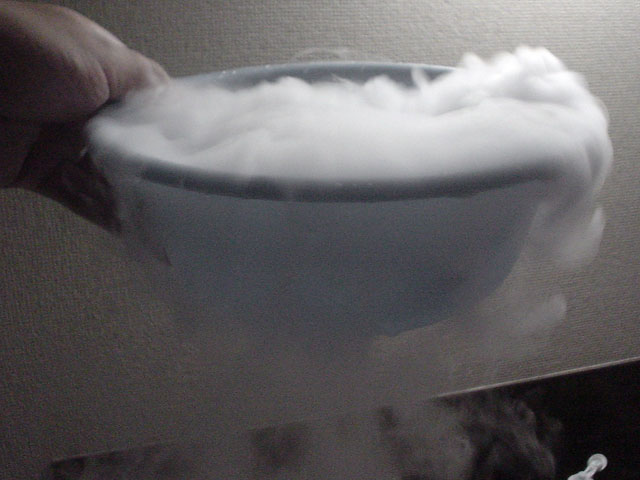
Dry ice in water

Liquid carbon dioxide (CO_{2}), stored in compressed cylinders, is used in conjunction with theatrical fog machines to produce "low-lying" fog effects. When liquid CO_{2} is used to chill theatrical fog, the result is a thick fog that stays within a few feet of the ground. As the fog warms, or is agitated, it rises and dissipates. Several manufacturers of theatrical fog fluid have developed specially formulated mixtures specifically designed to be used with CO_{2}, intended to provide thicker, more consistent fog effects. Effect duration is determined by the heating cycle of the theatrical fog machine and consumption rate of liquid CO_{2}.

Large billowing fog plumes are created from the condensation of liquid that dry ice is submerged into. As dry ice is submerged into a bulk of liquid, pure CO_{2} gas bubbles are formed; then the bulk liquid molecules start to evaporate at the surface of the bubbles into the gas bubbles. The evaporated liquid molecules are later condensed within the bubbles, creating a fog, which leads to more evaporation of liquid molecules into gas bubbles based on LeChatelier 's principle. The fog is released through an electric solenoid valve to control timing and duration. When the solenoid valve is closed, the fog rapidly disperses in the air, ending the effect nearly instantaneously. This effect can be used for a variety of applications, including simulating geysers of steam, in place of pyrotechnics, or to create an instant opaque wall for a reveal or disappearance during magic acts.

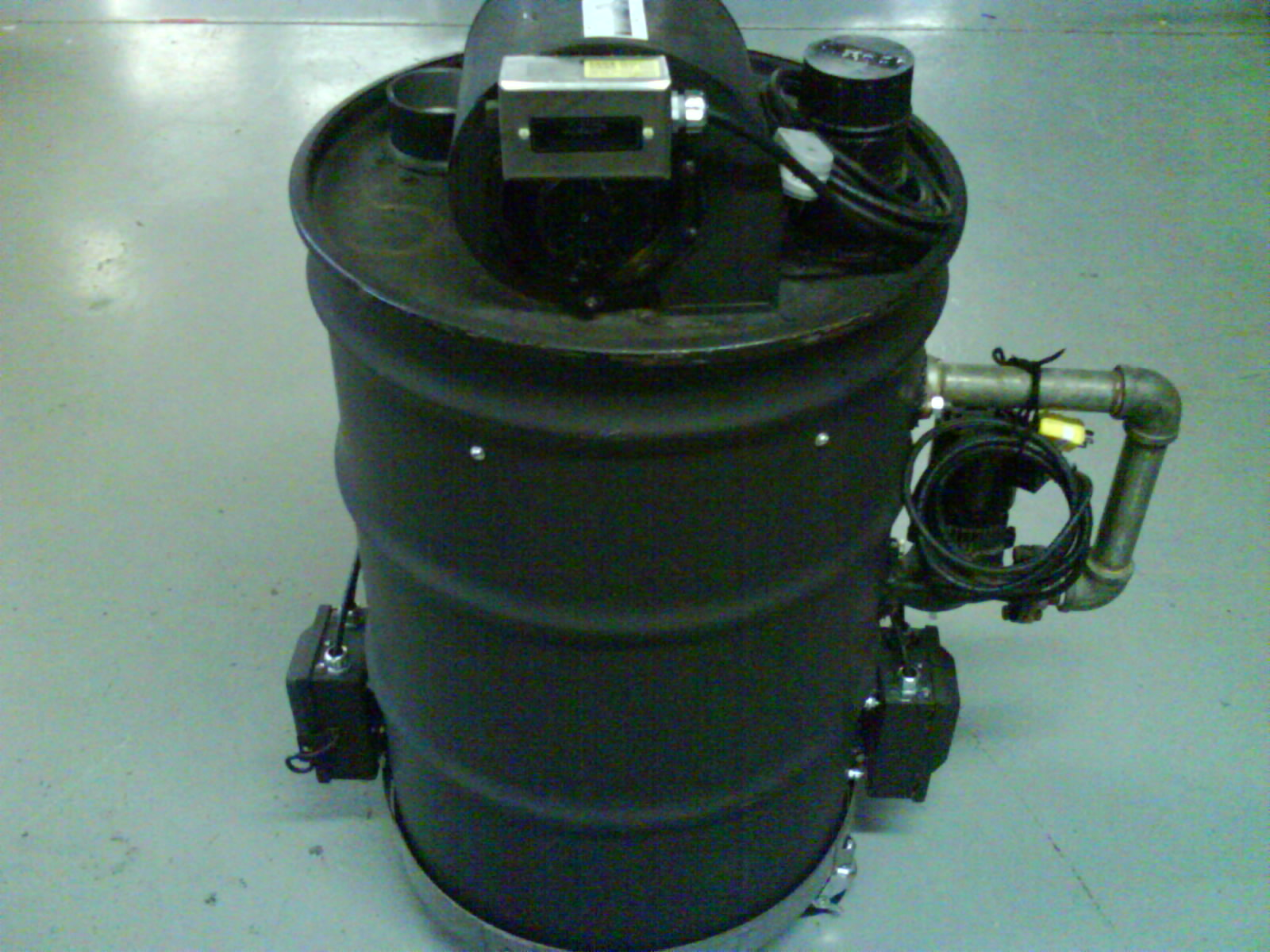
Generic dry ice machine made from a 45gal. drum

Dry ice (solid carbon dioxide) effects are produced by heating water to or near boiling in a suitable container (for example: a 55-gallon drum with water heater coils in it), and then dropping in one or more pieces of dry ice. Because carbon dioxide cannot exist as a liquid at atmospheric pressure, the dry ice sublimates and instantly produces a gas, condensing water vapor and creating a thick white fog. A fan placed at the top of the container directs the fog where it is needed, creating a rolling fog that lies low to the ground. As the submerged dry ice cools the water, the amount and duration of fog produced will be reduced, requiring "rest" periods to reheat the water.

Dry ice can also be used in conjunction with a fog machine to create a low-lying fog effect. Dry ice is placed inside an insulated container with an orifice at each end. Fog from a fog machine is pumped in one side of the container, and allowed to flow out the other end. Although this technique does allow an individual to create low-lying fog "on the cheap" (when compared to the cost of renting cylinders of liquid CO_{2} or watertight containers with integral heaters), the volume of low-lying fog produced is typically less, and is more susceptible to atmospheric disturbances.

=== Nitrogen ===
Liquid nitrogen (N_{2}) is used to create low-lying fog effects in a manner similar to dry ice. A machine heats water to at or near the boiling point, creating steam and increasing the humidity in a closed container. When liquid nitrogen is pumped into the container, the moisture rapidly condenses, creating a thick white fog. A fan placed at the output of the container directs the fog where it is needed, creating a rolling fog that lies low to the ground. These types of machines are commonly referred to as "dry foggers" because the fog created by this method consists solely of water droplets, and as it dissipates, there is little to no residue left on any surfaces. Dry Fogger is also a trademarked name for a particular brand of this style of fog machine. Liquid air can be used instead of nitrogen.

== Historical usage ==
The Globe Theatre (1598–1613) reportedly used smoke effects during performances for atmosphere and special effects.

On 23 March 1934, Adelaide Hall opened at Harlem's Cotton Club in The Cotton Club Parade 24th Edition. In the show Hall introduced the song "Ill Wind", which Harold Arlen and Ted Koehler wrote especially for her. It was during Hall's rendition of "Ill Wind" that nitrogen smoke was used to cover the floor of the stage. It was the first time such an effect had ever been used on a stage and caused a sensation.

== Smoke testing ==
When using smoke machines, a common test is to fill the venue to the full capacity with smoke to see if there are any smoke detectors still live, or if there are any leaks of smoke from the venue sufficient to set off detectors in other parts of the venue being tested. This practice is known as a smoke test.

Smoke machines are commonly used in the testing of larger HVAC systems to identify leaks in ducting, as well as to visualize airflow.

== Awards ==
The techniques and technology for creating smoke and fog effects are continually evolving. The individuals who create and develop theatrical fog for use in the entertainment industry have received numerous recognitions for their efforts.

=== Academy of Motion Picture Arts and Sciences ===
==== Technical achievement awards ====
- On March 7, 1992, the Academy of Motion Picture Arts and Sciences presented a Technical Achievement Award to Jim Doyle for the design and development of the Dry Fogger, which uses liquid nitrogen to produce a safe, dense, low-hanging dry fog.
- On February 28, 1998, the Academy of Motion Picture Arts and Sciences presented a Technical Achievement Award to James F. Foley (UCISCO); Charles Converse (UCISCO); F. Edward Gardner (UCISCO); Bob Stoker and Matt Sweeney for the development and realization of the Liquid Synthetic Air system.
- On January 4, 2008, the Academy of Motion Picture Arts and Sciences presented a Technical Achievement Award to Jörg Pöhler and Rüdiger Kleinke of OTTEC Technology GmbH for the design and development of the battery-operated series of fog machines known as "Tiny Foggers."

The operating characteristics of this compact, well-engineered and remote-controllable package make possible a range of safe special effects that would be totally impractical with larger, more conventional fog units.

==== Scientific and engineering award ====
- On March 25, 1985, the Academy of Motion Picture Arts and Sciences presented a Scientific and Engineering Award to Günther Schaidt of Rosco Laboratories for the development of an improved, non-toxic fluid for creating fog and smoke for motion picture production.

== Adverse health effects ==
=== Carbon dioxide ===
Unsafe concentrations of carbon dioxide can cause headaches, nausea, blurred vision, dizziness and shortness of breath. Higher concentrations will result in loss of consciousness and death due to suffocation. When using compressed carbon dioxide or dry ice, care should be taken to ensure there is sufficient ventilation available at all times, and that procedures are in place to rapidly evacuate CO_{2} from any enclosed space in an emergency.

Dry ice (−78.5 °C) presents a significant risk of frostbite if mishandled. Proper protective clothing, such as long sleeves and gloves, should always be worn when handling these products. Liquid carbon dioxide (5 atmospheres; −56.6 °C), stored in compressed cylinders, also presents all the hazards attendant to materials under pressure and should be handled accordingly.

=== Liquid nitrogen ===
Nitrogen itself is relatively non-toxic, but in high concentrations it can displace oxygen, creating a suffocation hazard. Liquid nitrogen (−195.8 °C) presents a significant risk of frostbite or cold burn if mishandled. Proper protective clothing, such as long sleeves and gloves, should always be worn when handling these products. Liquid nitrogen is stored in compressed cylinders, and therefore presents all the hazards attendant to materials under pressure and should be handled accordingly.

=== Theatrical fog and artificial mists ===
A number of studies have been published on the potential health effects presented by exposure to theatrical fogs and artificial mists.

The first study was done by Consultech Engineering, Co. under contract to Actor's Equity. The findings of the Consultech study were confirmed by two additional studies—a Health Hazard Evaluation completed in 1994 by the National Institute for Occupational Safety and Health, and another one in 2000 by the Department of Community and Preventative Medicine at the Mount Sinai School of Medicine and ENVIRON; Both prepared for Actors Equity and the League of American Theatres and Producers, focused on the effects on actors and performers in Broadway musicals. The conclusion of all three studies was that irritation of mucous membranes, such as the eyes and the respiratory tract, was associated with extended peak exposure to theatrical fog. Exposure guidelines were outlined in the 2000 study that, it was determined, should prevent actors from suffering adverse impact to their health or vocal abilities.

Another study focused on the use of theatrical fog in the commercial aviation industry for emergency training of staff in simulated fire conditions. This study found that eye and respiratory tract irritation can occur.

In May 2005, a study published in the American Journal of Industrial Medicine, conducted by the School of Environment and Health at the University of British Columbia, examined adverse respiratory effects in crew members across a wide variety of entertainment venues, ranging from live theatres, concerts, and television and film productions to a video arcade. This study determined that cumulative exposure to mineral oil and glycol-based fogs was associated with acute and chronic adverse effects on respiratory health. This study found that short-term exposure to glycol fog was associated with coughing, dry throat, headaches, dizziness, drowsiness, and tiredness. This study also found long-term exposure to smoke and fog was associated with both short-term and long-term respiratory problems such as chest tightness and wheezing. Personnel working closest to the fog machines had reduced lung function results.

The Entertainment Services and Technology Association has compiled a standard for theatrical fogs or artificial mists compositions for use in entertainment venues that "are not likely to be harmful to otherwise healthy performers, technicians, or audience members of normal working age, which is 18 to 64 years of age, inclusive." This standard was based (though not exclusively), upon the findings of a CIH literature studies commissioned by ESTA and applies only those fog fluid compositions that consist of a mixture of water and glycol and glycerin (so called "water based" fog fluid).

Short-term exposure to glycol fog can be associated with headaches, dizziness, drowsiness, and tiredness. Long-term exposure to smoke and fog can be related to upper airway and voice symptoms. Extended (multi-year) exposure to smoke and fog has been associated with both short-term and long-term respiratory health problems. Efforts should be made to reduce exposure to theatrical smoke to as low a level as possible. The use of digital effects in post-production on film and television sets can be considered a safer practice than using theatrical smoke and fog during filming, although this is not always practical.

=== Fine particulate matter (PM₂.₅) ===
Fine particulate matter, commonly referred to as PM₂.₅, consists of airborne particles with diameters of 2.5 micrometers or smaller that can enter the lungs and bloodstream. PM₂.₅ is associated with severe systemic inflammation, cardiovascular disease, and premature death.

Occupational exposure limits for theatrical fog are often published in milligrams (mg/m³), which translates to exceptionally high levels of micrograms (µg/m³) when compared with standard air quality metrics. For example, industry-recommended fog limits of 10 to 40 mg/m³ equal 10,000 to 40,000 µg/m³. For comparison, the United States Environmental Protection Agency's 24‑hour PM₂.₅ standard is 35 µg/m³, and the World Health Organization's guideline is 15 µg/m³. These occupational limits therefore exceed health‑based PM₂.₅ thresholds by several orders of magnitude.

Earlier assessments of theatrical smoke and fog measured only the total bulk aerosol mass rather than isolating fine particulate matter. A Health Hazard Evaluation by the National Institute for Occupational Safety and Health, and a subsequent study conducted by the Mount Sinai School of Medicine, did not measure PM₂.₅ concentrations. Later reviews noted that these studies were limited in scope and were not intended to establish safety for unprotected public audiences.

More recent peer‑reviewed studies have directly quantified PM₂.₅ generated by theatrical aerosols. A 2022 laboratory study by Guo et al. found that a 20‑second pulse of a fog machine generated an average PM₂.₅ concentration of 10,700 µg/m³ and released formaldehyde and other carbonyl compounds from stored fog fluids. A 2023 follow‑up study demonstrated that glycols commonly used in theatrical fogs undergo autoxidation during indoor operation, forming additional carbonyls such as formaldehyde.

Long‑term health effects of chronic exposure to theatrical fog have not been evaluated in epidemiological studies, and existing research has focused primarily on short‑term irritation and peak exposure events rather than cumulative PM₂.₅ exposure. Because theatrical fog generates elevated PM₂.₅ concentrations and carbonyls such as formaldehyde, it represents a source of fine particulate pollution associated with a wide range of adverse systemic health effects.

== Related technologies ==
Electronic cigarettes utilize aerosol-generating technology that is mechanically and chemically similar to that of theatrical fog and haze machines. Both applications function by heating glycol-based liquids to produce aerosols, whether for personal inhalation or for visual atmospheric effects. Scientific evaluations of both theatrical fog machines and electronic cigarettes demonstrate that they generate aerosols falling within the size range of fine particulate matter (PM₂.₅). Both fog fluids and e-cigarette liquids commonly contain propylene glycol, glycerin, or mixtures of the two, which undergo similar thermal degradation pathways when aerosolized. Research demonstrates that the thermal degradation of glycol-based fluids in both fog machines and electronic cigarettes produces similar chemical byproducts, including toxic carbonyl compounds such as formaldehyde.

== See also ==
- Fog machine
- Haze machine
- Lightning machine
- Composition of electronic cigarette aerosol
