= Enrique Jose Galvez =

Enrique Jose Galvez is a Charles A. Dana professor of physics and astronomy at Colgate University. His work focuses on optical physics as well as improving undergraduate laboratories.

== Education and career ==
Galvez pursued his undergraduate degree at Pontifical Catholic University of Peru, graduating with a Bachelor's of Science in 1980. He then obtained his PhD from the University of Notre Dame in 1986. He did his post-doc at Stony Brook University before joining Colgate University in 1988 as faculty, where he currently works.

== Research and publications ==
Galvez focuses on working with shaped optical beams. He has worked in areas of quantum optics, classical optics, and atomic physics. He is also the coauthor of three physics textbooks. He is currently working on photon entanglement and light in vector and scalar modes.

== Recognition ==
In 2024, he was named an American Physical Society fellow for mentoring undergraduate students in research and coursework as well as contributing to the design of approaches that help undergraduates learn quantum sciences. In 2020, he was the recipient of the Jonathan F. Reichert & Barbara Wolff-Reichert Award for Excellence in Advanced Laboratory Instruction for developing advanced labs that give students direct exposure to quantum mechanics. In 2019 and 2020 he was named the Community Champion by the International Society for Optics and Photonics (SPIE). In 2019, he was selected as a fellow of the Optical Society of America.
