= Propylene glycol =

- Propylene glycol

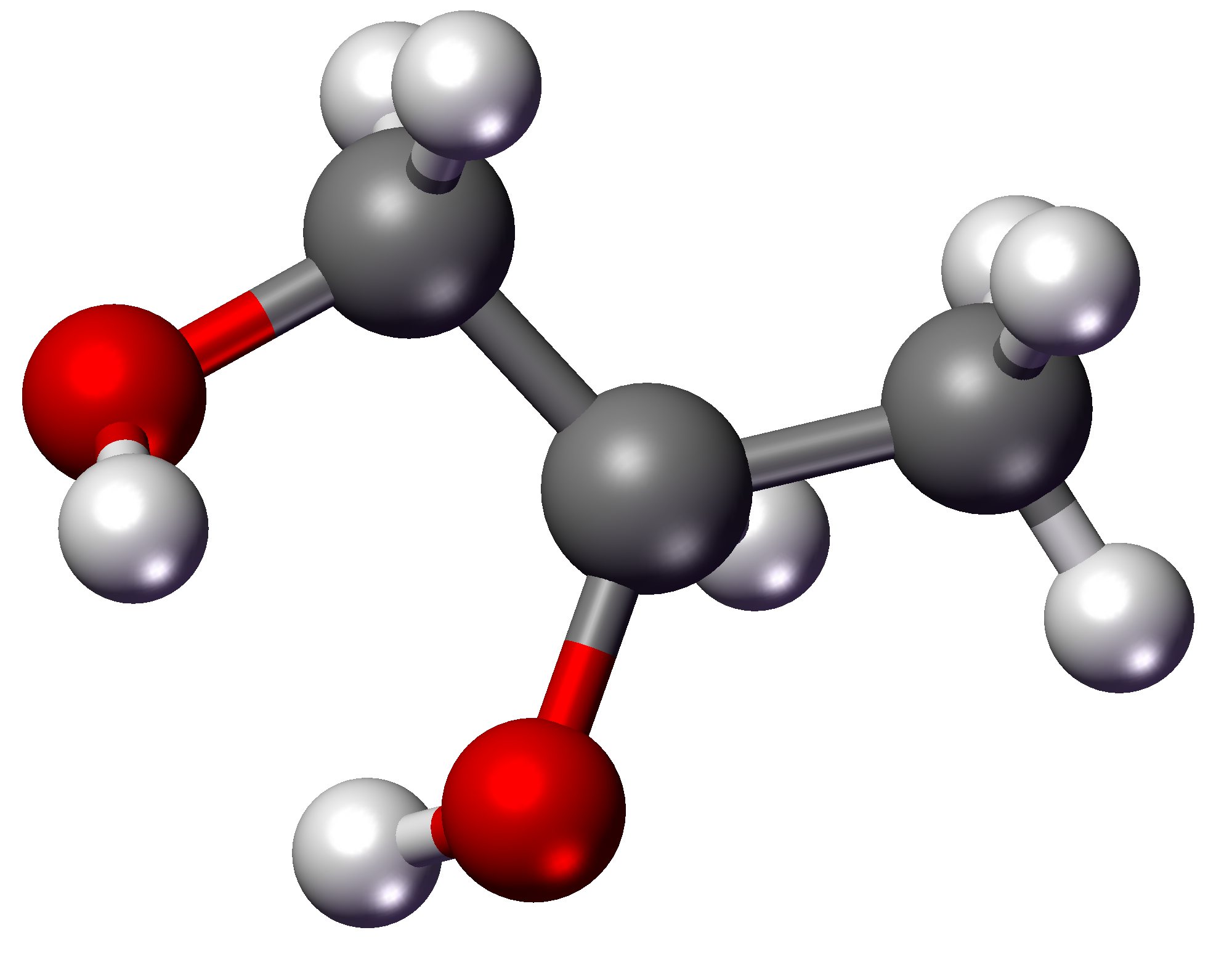
ball-and-stick model
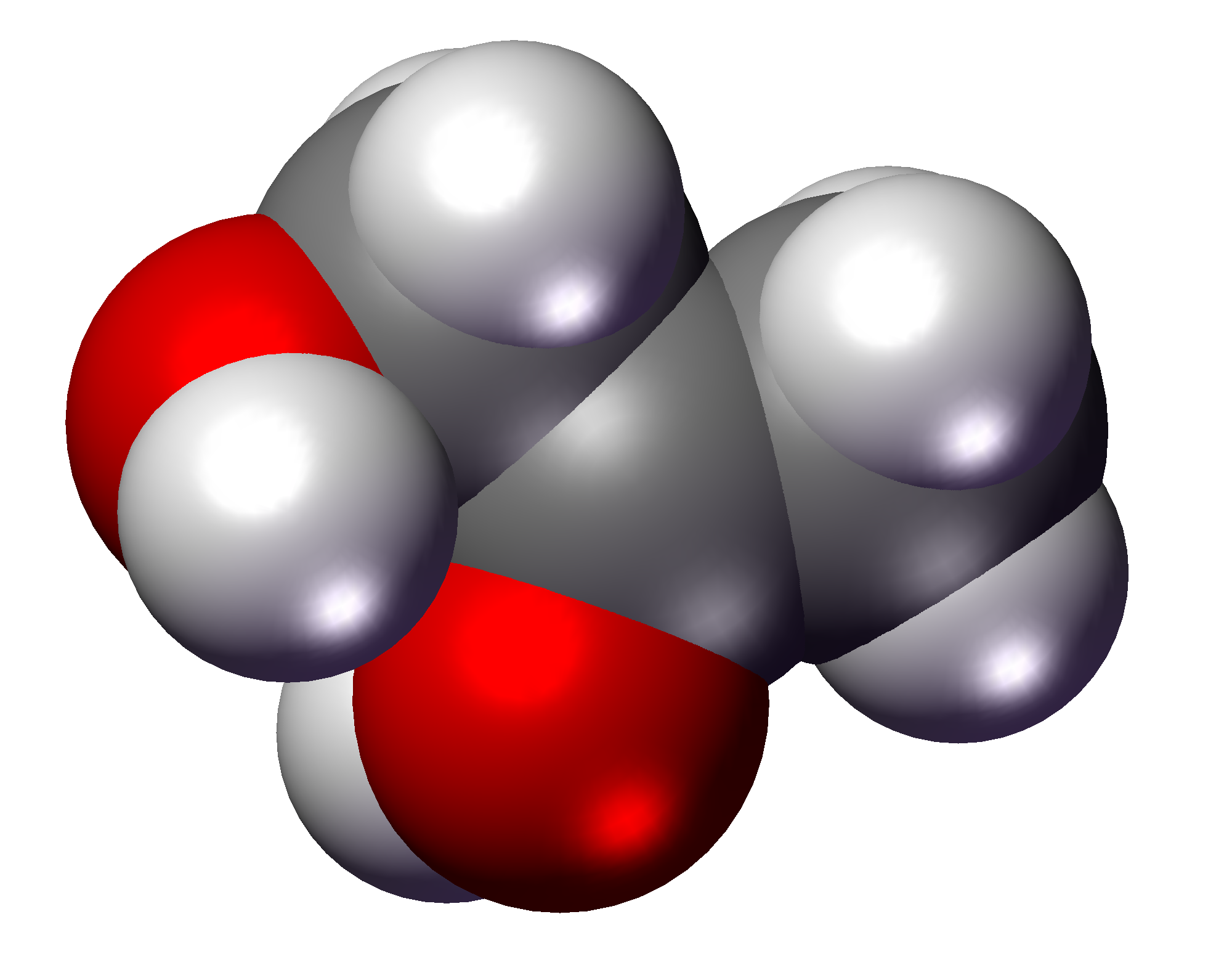
Space-filling model

Names
- Preferred IUPAC name Propane-1,2-diol
- Other names: Propylene glycol; α-Propylene glycol; 1,2-Propanediol; 1,2-Dihydroxypropane; Methyl ethyl glycol; Methylethylene glycol; PEG

Identifiers
CAS Number	57-55-6 racemic; 4254-15-3 S-enantiomer
3D model (JSmol)	Interactive image
ChEBI	CHEBI:16997
ChEMBL	ChEMBL286398
ChemSpider	13835224
ECHA InfoCard	100.000.307
EC Number	200-338-0
E number	E1520 (additional chemicals)
KEGG	C00583
PubChem CID	1030
RTECS number	TY6300000
UNII	6DC9Q167V3; 942194N4TD (S-enantiomer)
CompTox Dashboard (EPA)	DTXSID0021206
- InChI: InChI=1S/C3H8O2/c1-3(5)2-4/h3-5H,2H2,1H3 Key: DNIAPMSPPWPWGF-UHFFFAOYSA-N
- SMILES: CC(O)CO

Properties
Chemical formula	C_{3}H_{8}O_{2}
Molar mass	76.095 g·mol^{−1}
Appearance	colourless liquid
Odor	odorless
Density	1.036 g/cm^{3}
Melting point	−59 °C (−74 °F; 214 K)
Boiling point	188.2 °C (370.8 °F; 461.3 K)
Solubility in water	Miscible
Solubility in ethanol	Miscible
Solubility in diethyl ether	Miscible
Solubility in acetone	Miscible
Solubility in chloroform	Miscible
log P	−1.34
Vapor pressure	10.66 Pa (20 °C)
Thermal conductivity	0.34 W/m·K (50% H_{2}O @ 90 °C (194 °F))
Viscosity	0.042 Pa·s

Thermochemistry
Heat capacity (C)	189.9 J/(mol·K)

Pharmacology
ATCvet code	QA16QA01 (WHO)

Hazards
NFPA 704 (fire diamond)	0 1 0

Related compounds
Related glycols	Ethylene glycol, 1,3-propanediol
- Except where otherwise noted, data are given for materials in their standard state (at 25 °C [77 °F], 100 kPa). verify (what is ?) Infobox references

Propylene glycol (IUPAC name: propane-1,2-diol) is a viscous, colorless liquid. It is almost odorless and has a faintly sweet taste. Its chemical formula is CH_{3}CH(OH)CH_{2}OH. As it contains two alcohol groups, it is classified as a diol. An aliphatic diol may also be called a glycol. It is miscible with a broad range of solvents, including water, acetone, and chloroform. In general, glycols are non-irritating and have very low volatility.

For certain uses as a food additive, propylene glycol is considered as GRAS by the US Food and Drug Administration, and is approved for food manufacturing. In the European Union, it has E-number E1520 for food applications. For cosmetics and pharmacology, the number is E490. Propylene glycol is also present in propylene glycol alginate, which is known as E405.

Propylene glycol is approved and used as a vehicle for topical, oral, and some intravenous pharmaceutical preparations in the US and Europe.

== Structure ==
The compound is sometimes called (alpha) α-propylene glycol to distinguish it from the isomer propane-1,3-diol, known as (beta) β-propylene glycol. Propylene glycol is chiral. Commercial processes typically use the racemate. The S-enantiomer is produced by biotechnological routes.

== Production ==
=== Industrial ===
Industrially, propylene glycol is mainly produced from propylene oxide (for food-grade use). According to a 2018 source, 2.16 M tonnes are produced annually. Manufacturers use either non-catalytic high-temperature process at 200 °C (392 °F) to 220 °C (428 °F), or a catalytic method, which proceeds at 150 °C (302 °F) to 180 °C (356 °F) in the presence of ion exchange resin or a small amount of sulfuric acid or alkali.

Final products contain 20% propylene glycol, 1.5% of dipropylene glycol, and small amounts of other polypropylene glycols. Further purification produces finished industrial grade or USP/JP/EP/BP grade propylene glycol that is typically 99.5% or greater. Use of USP (US Pharmacopoeia) propylene glycol can reduce the risk of Abbreviated New Drug Application (ANDA) rejection.

Propylene glycol can also be obtained from glycerol, a byproduct from the production of biodiesel. This starting material is usually reserved for industrial use because of the noticeable odor and taste that accompanies the final product.

=== Laboratory ===
(S)-Propanediol is synthesized via fermentation methods. Lactic acid and lactaldehyde are common intermediates. Dihydroxyacetone phosphate, one of the two products of breakdown (glycolysis) of fructose 1,6-bisphosphate, is a precursor to methylglyoxal. This conversion is the basis of a potential biotechnological route to the commodity chemical 1,2-propanediol. Three-carbon deoxysugars are also precursor to the 1,2-diol.

A small-scale, nonbiological route from D-mannitol is illustrated in the following scheme:

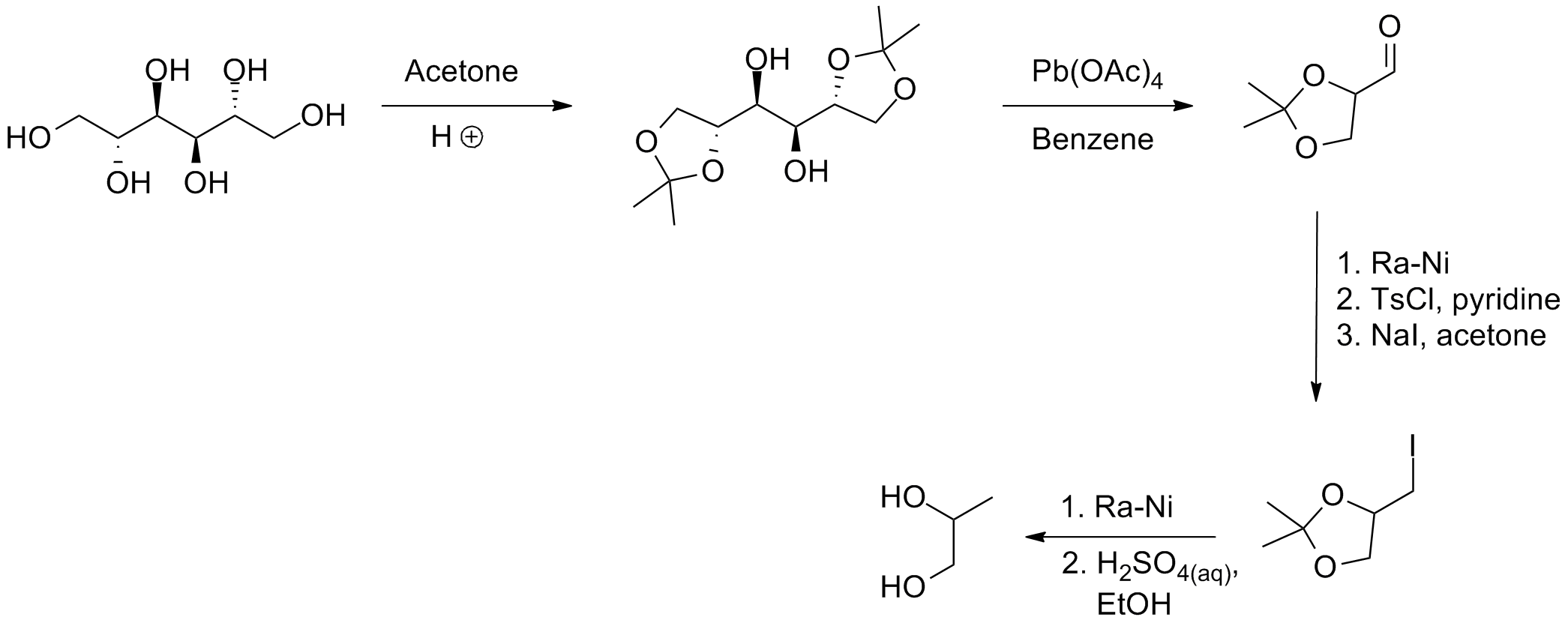

== Applications ==
=== Polymers ===
Forty-five percent of propylene glycol produced is used as a chemical feedstock for the production of unsaturated polyester resins. In this regard, propylene glycol reacts with a mixture of unsaturated maleic anhydride and isophthalic acid to give a copolymer. This partially unsaturated polymer undergoes further crosslinking to yield thermoset plastics. Related to this application, propylene glycol reacts with propylene oxide to give oligomers and polymers that are used to produce polyurethanes. Propylene glycol is used in water-based acrylic architectural paints to extend dry time which it accomplishes by preventing the surface from drying due to its slower evaporation rate compared to water.

=== Food and drug ===
In regulated amounts, propylene glycol is designated as safe for food manufacturing as an anticaking agent, emulsifier, flavor agent, humectant, texturizer, stabilizer, solvent, antioxidant, antimicrobial agent, and thickener.

As regulated by the US FDA for substances deemed as GRAS, propylene glycol is "not subject to premarket review and approval by FDA because it is generally recognized, by qualified experts, to be safe under the intended conditions of use." The scientific panel evaluating propylene glycol for food manufacturing defined its conclusion as: "There is no evidence in the available information on [propylene glycol] that demonstrates, or suggests reasonable grounds to suspect, a hazard to the public when they are used at levels that are now current or might reasonably be expected in the future."

The FDA law defined maximum limits for the use of propylene glycol in various food categories under good manufacturing practices:

- 2.0% for general food categories
- 2.5% for frozen dairy products
- 5% for alcoholic beverages
- 5% for nuts and nut products
- 24% for confections and frostings
- 97% for seasonings and flavorings

The European Food Safety Authority authorizes propylene glycol for use in food manufacturing, establishing a safe daily intake of 25 mg per kg of body weight. Specifically for ice cream or ice milk products, Health Canada permits use of propylene glycol mono fatty acid esters as an emulsifier and stabilizer at a maximum level of use of 0.35% of the ice cream made from the ingredients mix.

Propylene glycol is used in a variety of other edible items, such as baked goods, desserts, prepared meals, flavoring mixes, candy, popcorn, whipped dairy products, and soda. It is also used in beer to stabilize the foam.

Vaporizers used for delivery of pharmaceuticals or personal-care products often include propylene glycol among the ingredients. In alcohol-based hand sanitizers, it is used as a humectant to prevent the skin from drying. Propylene glycol is used as a solvent in many pharmaceuticals, including oral, injectable, and topical formulations. Many pharmaceutical drugs which are insoluble in water utilize propylene glycol as a solvent and carrier; benzodiazepine tablets are one example. Propylene glycol is also used as a solvent and carrier for many pharmaceutical capsule preparations. Additionally, certain formulations of artificial tears use propylene glycol as an ingredient.

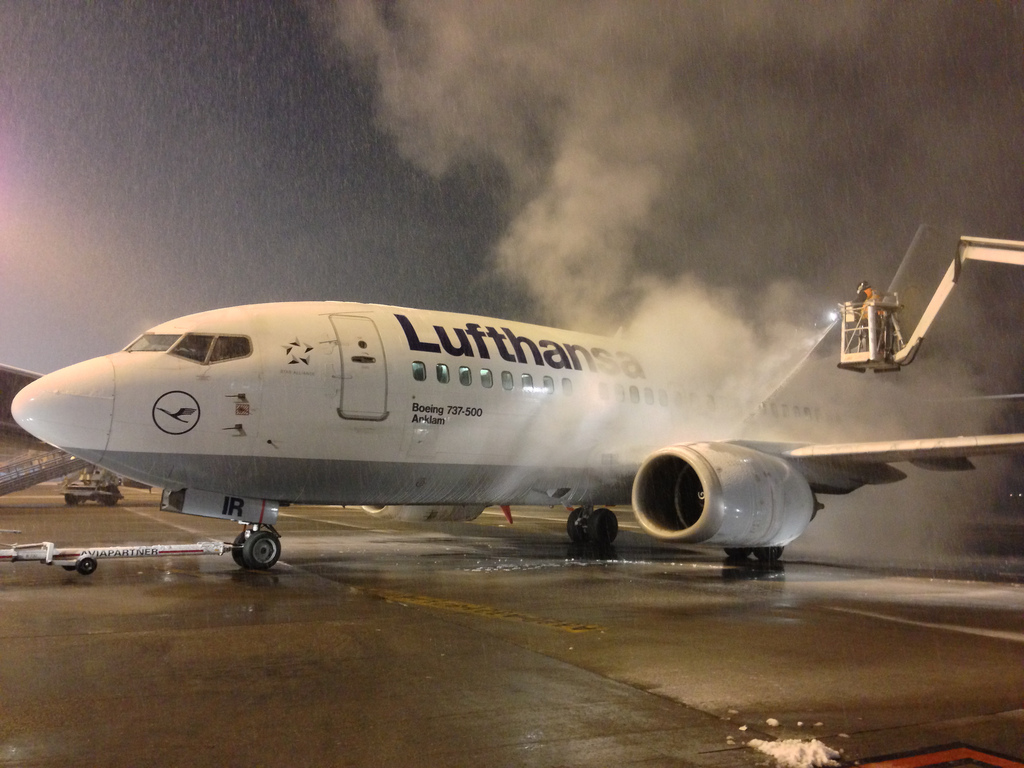
Propylene glycol is commonly used to de-ice aircraft.

=== Antifreeze ===
The freezing point of water is depressed when mixed with propylene glycol. It is used as aircraft de-icing and anti-icing fluid. A 50% water-diluted and heated solution is used for removal of icing accretions from the fuselages of commercial aircraft on the ground (de-icing), and 100% undiluted cold solution is used only on wings and tail surfaces of an aircraft in order to prevent ice accretion from forming during a specific period of time before takeoff (anti-icing). Normally, such time-frame is limited to 15–90 minutes, depending on the severity of snowfall and outside air temperature. Water-propylene glycol mixtures dyed pink to indicate the mixture is relatively nontoxic are sold under the name of RV or marine antifreeze. Propylene glycol is frequently used as a substitute for ethylene glycol in low toxicity, environmentally friendly automotive antifreeze. It is also used to winterize the plumbing systems in vacant structures. The eutectic composition/temperature is 60:40 propylene glycol:water/−60 °C. The −50 °F/−45 °C commercial product is, however, water rich; a typical formulation is 40:60.

=== Electronic cigarettes liquid ===
Propylene glycol, vegetable glycerin, or a mixture of both, are the main ingredients in e-liquid used in electronic cigarettes. They are aerosolized to resemble smoke and serve as carriers for substances such as nicotine and flavorants.

=== Theatrical smoke and fog ===
Propylene glycol is widely used in theatrical smoke and fog effects for film, television, and live entertainment. So‑called fog machines or hazers aerosolize a mixture of propylene glycol and water to create the illusion of smoke. While many commercial fluids use propylene glycol, some use oil or triethylene glycol. Those that use propylene glycol do so in a process similar to electronic cigarettes, using a heating element to produce a dense aerosol. The fog produced by these machines has the aesthetic appearance of smoke, but without the combustion products associated with actual smoke.

Studies have documented that glycol‑based fogs can generate very high concentrations of fine particulate matter (PM₂.₅) and release formaldehyde and other toxic carbonyl compounds during operation.

== Miscellaneous applications ==
- As a solvent for many substances, both natural and synthetic.
- As a humectant (E1520).
- As a freezing point depressant for slurry ice.
- In veterinary medicine as an oral treatment for hyperketonaemia in ruminants.
- In the cosmetics industry, where propylene glycol is very commonly used as a carrier or base for various types of makeup.
- For trapping and preserving insects (including as a DNA preservative).
- As an additive in polymerase chain reaction (PCR) to reduce the melting temperature of nucleic acids for targeting of GC rich sequences.
- As a surfactant, it is used to prevent water from beading up on objects. It is used in photography for this purpose to reduce the risk of water spots, or deposits of minerals from water used to process film or paper.
- As an ingredient in couplants for ultrasonic testing and medical ultrasound.

== Safety in humans ==
When used in average quantities, propylene glycol has no measurable effect on development and/or reproduction on animals and probably does not adversely affect human development or reproduction without active use. The safety of electronic cigarettes—which use propylene glycol-based preparations of nicotine or THC and other cannabinoids—is the subject of much controversy. Vitamin E acetate has also been identified in this controversy.

=== Oral administration ===
The acute oral toxicity of propylene glycol is very low, and large quantities are required to cause perceptible health effects in humans; in fact, the toxicity of propylene glycol is one third that of ethanol. Propylene glycol is metabolized in the human body into pyruvic acid (a normal part of the glucose-metabolism process, readily converted to energy), acetic acid (handled by ethanol-metabolism), lactic acid (a normal acid generally abundant during digestion), and propionaldehyde (a potentially hazardous substance). According to the Dow Chemical Company, the LD_{50} (dose that kills 50% of the test population) for rats is 20 g/kg (oral/rat).

Toxicity generally occurs at plasma concentrations over 4 g/L, which requires extremely high intake over a relatively short period of time, or when used as a vehicle for drugs or vitamins given intravenously or orally in large bolus doses. It would be nearly impossible to reach toxic levels by consuming foods or supplements, which contain at most, by mass, one per mille of PG, except for alcoholic beverages in the US, which are allowed five percent by mass. Cases of propylene glycol poisoning are usually related to either inappropriate intravenous administration or accidental ingestion of large quantities.

The potential for long-term oral toxicity is also low. In a National Toxicology Program continuous breeding study, no effects on fertility were observed in male or female mice that received propylene glycol in drinking water at doses up to 10,100 mg/kg bw/day. No effects on fertility were seen in either the first or second generation of treated mice. In a two-year study, 12 rats were provided with feed containing as much as 5% propylene glycol, and showed no apparent ill effects.

=== Skin and eye contact ===
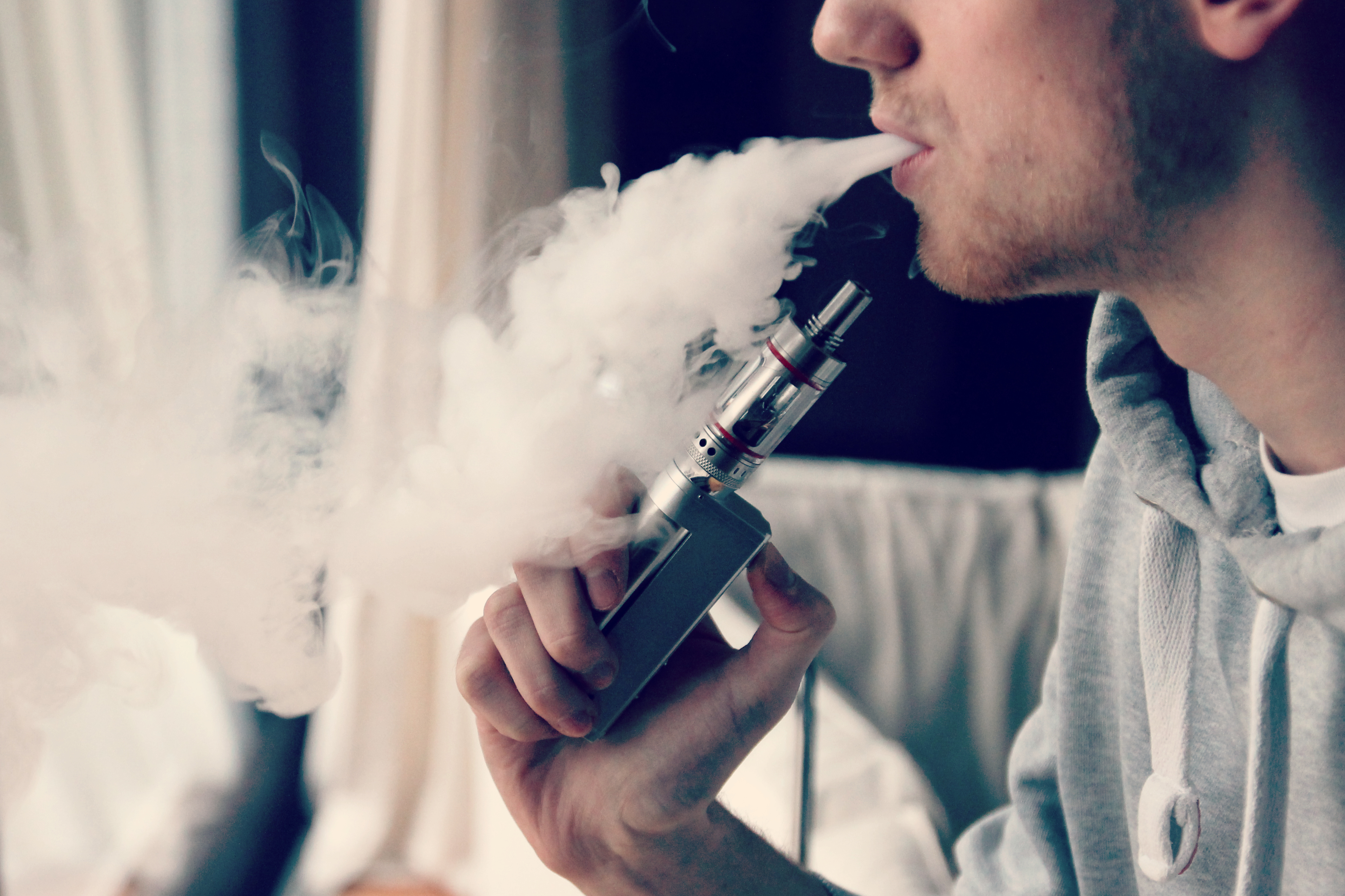
Propylene glycol is often used in electronic cigarettes.

Propylene glycol may be non-irritating to the skin, see section Allergic reaction below for details on allergic reactions. Undiluted propylene glycol is minimally irritating to the eye, producing slight transient conjunctivitis; the eye recovers after the exposure is removed.

Propylene glycol has not caused sensitization or carcinogenicity in laboratory animal studies, nor has it demonstrated genotoxic potential.

=== Inhalation ===
Inhalation of propylene glycol vapors appears to present no significant hazard in ordinary applications. Due to the possibility of upper respiratory irritation, it is recommended that propylene glycol not be used in inhalation applications such as theatrical productions, or antifreeze solutions for emergency eye wash stations. Recently, propylene glycol (commonly alongside glycerol) has been included as a carrier for nicotine and other additives in e-cigarette liquids, the use of which presents a novel form of exposure. The potential hazards of chronic inhalation of propylene glycol or the latter substance as a whole are as-yet unknown.

According to a 2010 study, the concentrations of PGEs (counted as the sum of propylene glycol and glycol ethers) in indoor air, particularly bedroom air, has been linked to increased risk of developing numerous respiratory and immune disorders in children, including asthma, hay fever, eczema, and allergies, with increased risk ranging from 50% to 180%. This concentration has been linked to use of water-based paints and water-based system cleansers. However, the study authors write that glycol ethers and not propylene glycol are the likely culprit.

=== Intravenous administration ===
Studies with intravenously administered propylene glycol have resulted in LD_{50} values in rats and rabbits of 7 mL/kg BW. Ruddick (1972) also summarized intramuscular LD_{50} data for rat as 13–20 mL/kg BW, and 6 mL/kg BW for the rabbit. Adverse effects to intravenous administration of drugs that use propylene glycol as an excipient have been seen in a number of people, particularly with large bolus dosages. Responses may include CNS depression, "hypotension, bradycardia, QRS and T abnormalities on the ECG, arrhythmia, cardiac arrhythmias, seizures, agitation, serum hyperosmolality, lactic acidosis, and haemolysis". A high percentage (12–42%) of directly-injected propylene glycol is eliminated or secreted in urine unaltered depending on dosage, with the remainder appearing in its glucuronide-form. The speed of renal filtration decreases as dosage increases, which may be due to propylene glycol's mild anesthetic / CNS-depressant properties as an alcohol. In one case, intravenous administration of propylene glycol-suspended nitroglycerin to an elderly man may have induced coma and acidosis. However, no confirmed lethality from propylene glycol was reported.

=== Animals ===
Propylene glycol is an approved food additive for dog and sugar glider food under the category of animal feed and is generally recognized as safe for dogs, with an LD_{50} of 9 mL/kg. The LD_{50} is higher for most laboratory animals (20 mL/kg). However, it is prohibited for use in food for cats due to links to Heinz body formation and a reduced lifespan of red blood cells. Heinz body formation from MPG has not been observed in dogs, cattle, or humans.

=== Allergic reaction ===
Estimates on the prevalence of propylene glycol allergy range from 0.8% (10% propylene glycol in aqueous solution) to 3.5% (30% propylene glycol in aqueous solution). The North American Contact Dermatitis Group (NACDG) data from 1996 to 2006 showed that the most common site for propylene glycol contact dermatitis was the face (25.9%), followed by a generalized or scattered pattern (23.7%). Investigators believe that the incidence of allergic contact dermatitis to propylene glycol may be greater than 2% in patients with eczema or fungal infections, which are very common in countries with lesser sun exposure and lower-than-normal vitamin D balances. Therefore, propylene glycol allergy is more common in those countries.

Because of its potential for allergic reactions and frequent use across a variety of topical and systemic products, propylene glycol was named the American Contact Dermatitis Society's Allergen of the Year for 2018. Recent publication from The Mayo Clinic reported 0.85% incidence of positive patch tests to propylene glycol (100/11,738 patients) with an overall irritant rate of 0.35% (41/11,738 patients) during a 20-year period of 1997–2016. 87% of the reactions were classified as weak and 9% as strong. The positive reaction rates were 0%, 0.26%, and 1.86% for 5%, 10%, and 20% propylene glycol respectively, increasing with each concentration increase. The irritant reaction rates were 0.95%, 0.24%, and 0.5% for 5%, 10%, and 20% propylene glycol, respectively. Propylene glycol skin sensitization occurred in patients sensitive to a number of other concomitant positive allergens, most common of which were: Myroxylon pereirae resin, benzalkonium chloride, carba mix, potassium dichromate, neomycin sulfate; for positive propylene glycol reactions, the overall median of 5 and mean of 5.6 concomitant positive allergens was reported.

== Environmental impacts ==
Propylene glycol occurs naturally, probably as the result of anaerobic catabolism of sugars in the human gut. It is degraded by vitamin B_{12}-dependent enzymes, which convert it to propionaldehyde.

Propylene glycol is expected to degrade rapidly in water from biological processes, but is not expected to be significantly influenced by hydrolysis, oxidation, volatilization, bioconcentration, or adsorption to sediment. Propylene glycol is readily biodegradable under aerobic conditions in freshwater, in seawater and in soil. Therefore, propylene glycol is considered as not persistent in the environment.

Propylene glycol exhibits a low degree of toxicity toward aquatic organisms. Several guideline studies available for freshwater fish with the lowest observed lethal concentration of 96-h LC50 value of 40,613 mg/L in a study with Oncorhynchus mykiss. Similarly, the lethal concentration determined in marine fish is a 96-h LC50 of >10,000 mg/L in Scophthalmus maximus.

Although propylene glycol has low toxicity, it exerts high levels of biochemical oxygen demand (BOD) during degradation in surface waters. This process can adversely affect aquatic life by consuming oxygen needed by aquatic organisms for survival. Large quantities of dissolved oxygen (DO) in the water column are consumed when microbial populations decompose propylene glycol.
