= Rosco Laboratories =

Manufacturing company headquartered in Stamford, CT, USA

- Company type: Private
- Industry: Entertainment industry
- Founded: 1910; 115 years ago
- Founders: Sydney Rosenstein
- Headquarters: Stamford, Connecticut, U.S.
- Area served: Worldwide
- Key people: Mark Engel (CEO); Stan Miller (Chairman)
- Products: Color gels; Fog machines and fluids; Scenic paints
- Website: rosco.com

Rosco Laboratories is an American manufacturer of products for entertainment, including the film industry and theatre. Rosco was founded in Brooklyn in 1910, and is currently based in Stamford, Connecticut. The company produces lighting equipment such as LED lighting, color gels and gobos. Rosco also manufactures specialist paints and fog machines.

== History ==
=== Early history ===
Rosco Laboratories was founded in 1910 by Sydney Rosenstein, a Brooklyn, New York, chemist. Rosco's first products were Colorine and Opaline, lacquers designed to color and frost light bulbs. The two lacquers were used in early electric theater marquees.

Rosco soon expanded their product line to include color gels for theater production lighting, as well as gobos. Recognising the growing need for gels in the industry, cousins Stan Miller and Len Kraft purchased Rosco in 1958. The company moved from Brooklyn to Westchester County in 1962.

=== 1960s–present ===
Under the leadership of Miller, Rosco further developed their gel technologies and introduced new products, such as fog machines, LED lighting fixtures and backdrops. These products proved to be successful in the motion picture industry, with Rosco's CineGel, fog fluid, CalColor and day/night backdrops winning Academy Awards.

The company's warehouse in Hollywood burned down in 1999, in a fire that also destroyed a lighting equipment restoration company and a thrift store. The Los Angeles Fire Department attributed the fire's intensity to the large inventory of synthetic paints in the warehouse.

Rosco paints experienced a shortage in 2021, after cold weather and power outages in Texas damaged the company's stock of raw materials. In addition to the general paint shortage, the production of Barbie led to a shortage of Rosco's pink paints. The film's producers purchased Rosco's entire stock of pink paint to support Barbie's production design, which emphasized the color pink.

As of 2023, Rosco operates worldwide, with offices in the US, Australia, Brazil, Canada, China, Singapore, Spain, UAE and the United Kingdom.

== Awards ==
Rosco is the recipient of four Academy Scientific and Technical Awards, in 1973, 1984, 1998, and 2000. The company has been recognized for its innovations in gels, fog fluids, and backdrops. Rosco is also the recipient of a 2004 Primetime Emmy Engineering Award for its innovation in backdrops.
