= Powder photography =

Special effect in photography

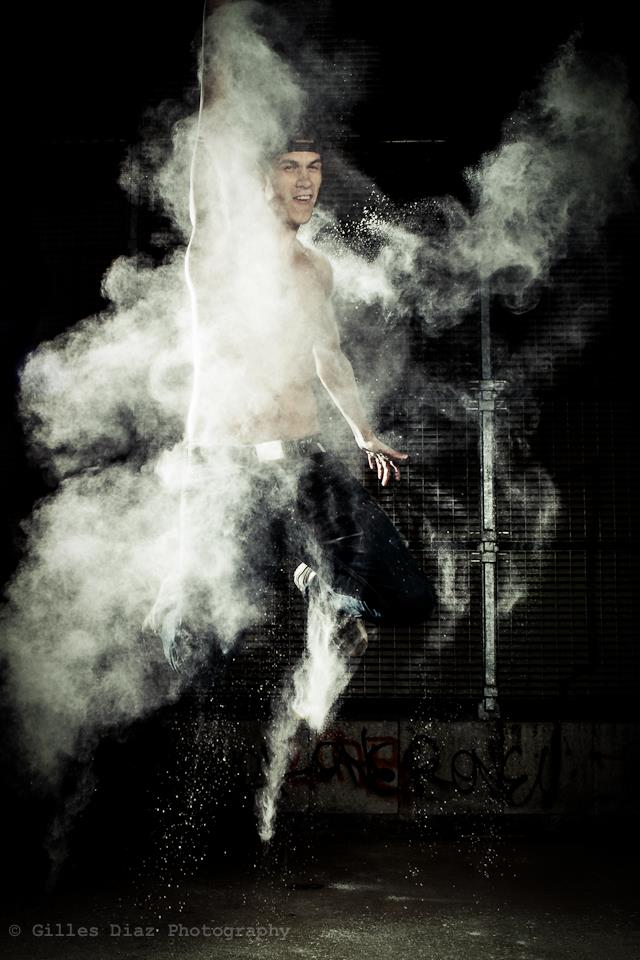
Gilles Diaz Powder Photography Hip Hop Dancer

Powder photography is a special effect technique in photography where photographers use various types of powdered substances (e.g. baby powder, talc, holi powder, or flour) on a model while shooting with high speed flashes. To achieve a similar effect, powder can be replaced with a smoke machine; however, that requires a different set up.

== Technical set up ==
To use powdered substances in photography it is essential to have a structured photo shoot set up. A minimum of two lights are needed. The main light (high speed flash in this case) is located at the front of the photo scene and back light(s) at the back of the scene to outline the powder. The powder is either thrown at the model at the moment of camera shoot by an assistant, or the model would perform a movement tossing the powder that was previously applied to the hair, arms, legs, etc. As a result, the photo shows captured movement of a model with a smoke-like effect.

== Smoke machine ==
This type of technique is an alternative to a smoke machine. Some photographers prefer powder to the smoke machine as it is cheaper and also could be used at any location since it does not require electric power. The drawbacks of the technique are stained clothing, health hazards (with certain types of powder), and environmental pollution when using it outdoors.

== Use in types of photography ==
Powder photography is used for engagement photo shoots, fighters, or dance performers to outline the movements of the specific body parts or the models as a whole.

== Origin ==
The inspiration of powder photography comes from the Holi festival of India where one of the traditions during the festival is to spray colors of rich pigment on each other.
