= Haze machine =

Homogenous cloud producer

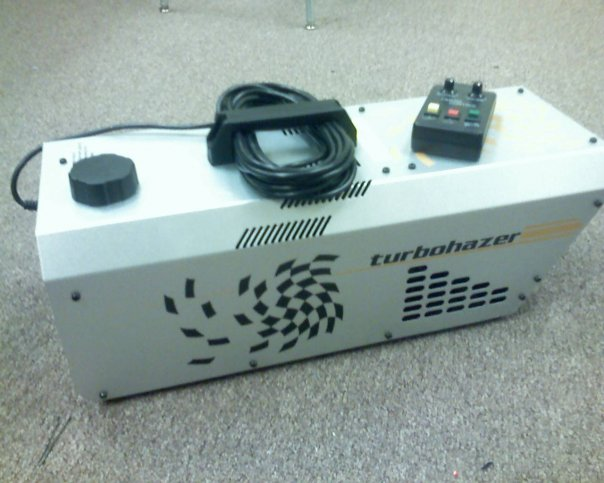
A haze machine with remote control

Haze machines, or haze generators (commonly referred to as hazers), are effects machines similar to fog machines, designed to produce unobtrusive, homogeneous clouds suspended in the air intended primarily to make light beams visible or create a subtle diffusion.

== Properties ==
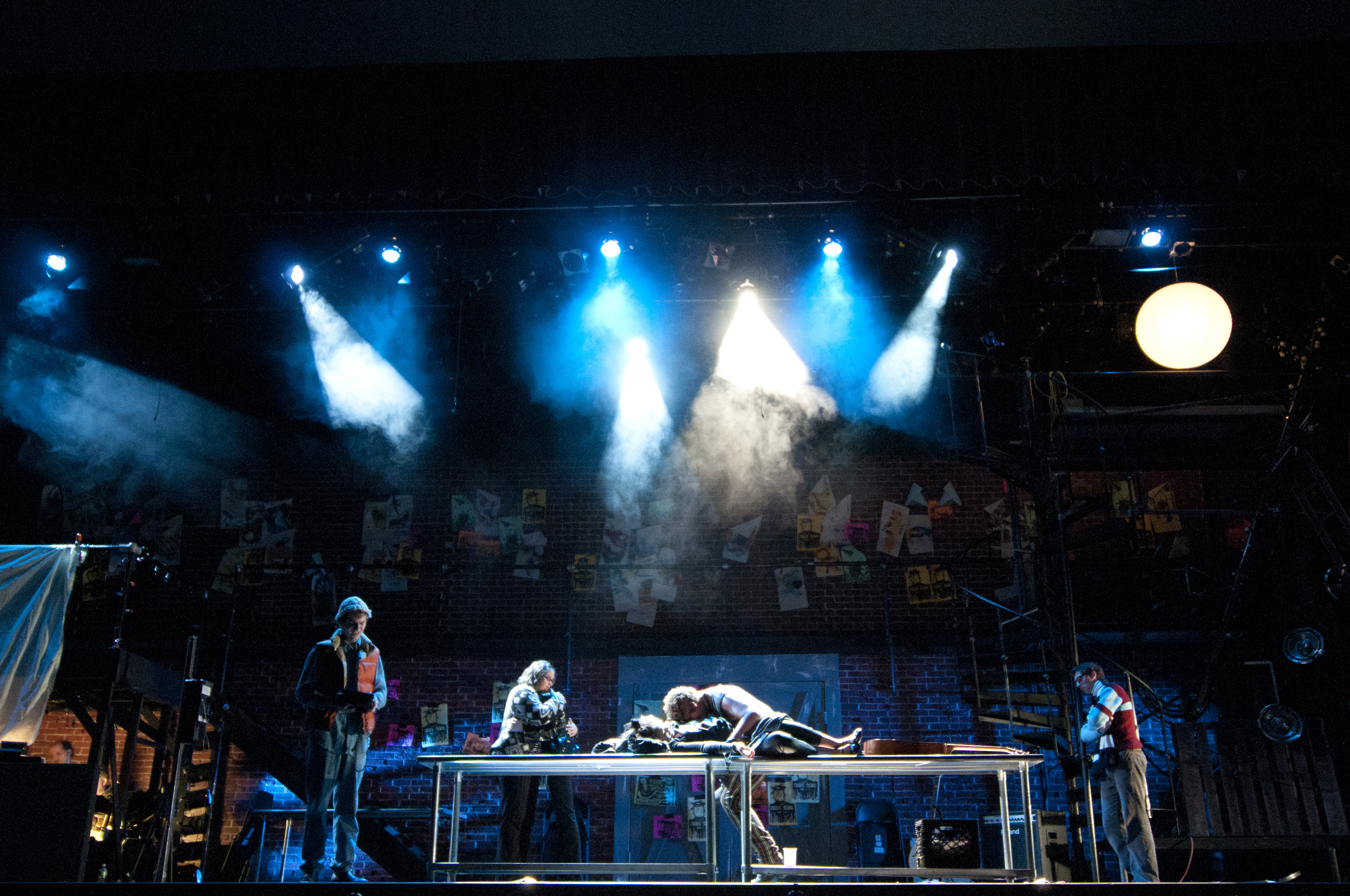
Haze can reveal beams of light from stage lighting instruments without obscuring the view of actors onstage.

Unlike theatrical fog, which is typically intended to be dense and/or opaque, haze is generally very light and subtle. These properties allow a venue to be filled with haze prior to or during an event without creating an overtly distracting cloud. Haze typically has a substantially longer persistence ("hang time") than conventional theatrical fog. While conventional fog will hang in the air for several minutes, a haze effect filling the same volume of space can last upwards of an hour to several hours or more, depending on the size of the venue and the amount of ventilation.

The fluid used in haze machines to generate the effects is either oil or water-based. Most oil-based haze fluids use a mineral oil base, while water-based fluids use either a propylene glycol or glycerol base. Although both formulations of fluid are referred to as haze fluid, the different formulations are neither compatible nor interchangeable. Propylene glycol/water haze fluid is sometimes referred to as "water based haze" to avoid ambiguity. Describing the fluid as "glycol" might cause stagehands to use automotive antifreeze, which contains ethylene glycol, and unlike propylene glycol, must not be used for this purpose because of its toxicity.

== Technology ==
=== Crackers ===
Crackers (also known as "oil crackers") were first developed in the 1960s. The fluid is usually, though not always, refined mineral oil. Crackers work by use of a spray pump powered either by electricity or compressed CO_{2} passing through a dispersion head into a fluid reservoir. The compressed air aerosols the fluid, dispersing fine droplets. Because the haze is mechanically generated, this type of machine does not require any warm-up time.

=== Pump spray ===
Pump spray haze machines use electricity or compressed CO_{2} to power a spray pump connected to a mixing valve, which draws in and atomizes the fluid.

Pump hazers also include machines which function in the same manner as a fog machine, pumping fluid into a heated chamber where it is vapourized to produce a cloud. Hazers, which heat fluid to create an atmospheric effect, only use mixtures of water and glycol or glycerine. Spray hazers, which atomize fluid, can use either a water-based or mineral oil fluid.

=== Aerosol ===
Smaller volumes of haze can also be generated from aerosol canisters containing mineral oil under pressure. Although the density of haze generated and the volume of space that can be filled are significantly smaller than those of a haze machine, aerosol canisters have the advantages of portability, no requirements for electricity, and finer control over the volume of haze generated.

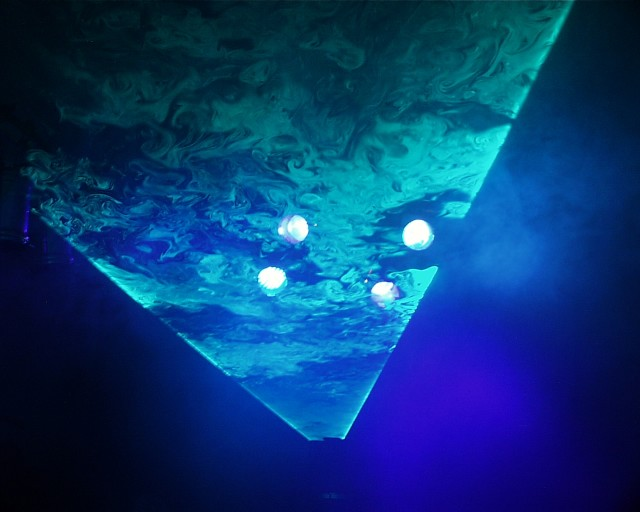
A laser passing through fog

=== Ultrasonic ===
Ultrasonic haze machines use transducers submerged in a reservoir of fluid to create atmospheric effects. Although less common than some of the other technologies used to produce haze, ultrasonic hazers are promoted as generating their effects with much less noise than other technologies.

=== Faze machines ===
Faze machines, or fazers, can also be used to produce a haze-like effect. These machines are typically fog machines with a fan built in front to disperse the output, creating a haze-like effect. These machines are typically considered more cost effective, with prices ranging from US$100–400 as compared to haze machines with prices ranging from US$400–1,400.

== Fire detection ==
Although the atmospheric effect created by hazers produces a significantly smaller particle size, around one micrometre (um), compared to the effect generated by a fog machine (hence the finer composition of the "cloud"), the size of the particle and effect varies by manufacturer and type of fluid used. Because of this, haze is far less likely to set off fire alarms than fog machines or larger smoke particles.

== Adverse health effects ==
=== Fine particulate matter (PM₂.₅) ===
Haze machines operate by vaporizing glycol‑ or mineral‑oil‑based fluids to create a long‑lasting atmospheric haze. The thermal vaporization of propylene glycol and glycerin used in many haze fluids is similar to the aerosol‑generation mechanism found in electronic nicotine delivery systems (ENDS), such as electronic cigarettes.

Although haze machine aerosols can fall within the size range of fine particulate matter (PM₂.₅), most evaluations of haze emissions have not reported PM₂.₅ concentrations in the micrograms‑per‑cubic‑meter (µg/m³) units used in ambient air‑quality regulation. PM₂.₅ exposure is associated with severe systemic inflammation, cardiovascular disease, and premature death.

Industry and occupational‑health documents typically report haze concentrations in milligrams per cubic meter (mg/m³). Guidance levels cited in reports from Rosco Laboratories, the International Alliance of Theatrical Stage Employees, and the American Society of Entertainment Personnel and Organizations recommend peak concentrations of 10–40 mg/m³ for glycol‑based atmospheric effects and up to 25 mg/m³ for mineral‑oil haze. Because 1 mg/m³ equals 1,000 µg/m³, these recommended levels correspond to 10,000–40,000 µg/m³—concentrations far above the PM₂.₅ levels classified as “Unhealthy,” “Very Unhealthy,” or “Hazardous” in U.S. Environmental Protection Agency air‑quality guidelines.

Earlier evaluations reported only total aerosol concentrations and did not measure size‑fractionated particulate matter such as PM₂.₅.

Peer‑reviewed studies published in 2022 and 2023 have begun to characterize the particulate and chemical composition of glycol‑based haze aerosols. Guo et al. (2022) found that artificial fog and haze generated from propylene glycol (PG) and triethylene glycol (TEG) produced substantial amounts of ultrafine particulate matter and elevated indoor concentrations of formaldehyde and other carbonyl compounds. A follow‑up study by Guo et al. (2023) demonstrated that glycols commonly used in artificial fogs and hazes undergo autoxidation, producing toxic carbonyls through reactions with indoor oxidants. Long‑term health effects of chronic exposure to haze machine aerosols have not been evaluated in epidemiological studies, and existing research has focused primarily on short‑term irritation and peak exposure events rather than cumulative PM₂.₅ exposure.

== See also ==
- Theatrical smoke and fog
- Fog machine
- Composition of electronic cigarette aerosol
