= Ray of Light (sculpture) =

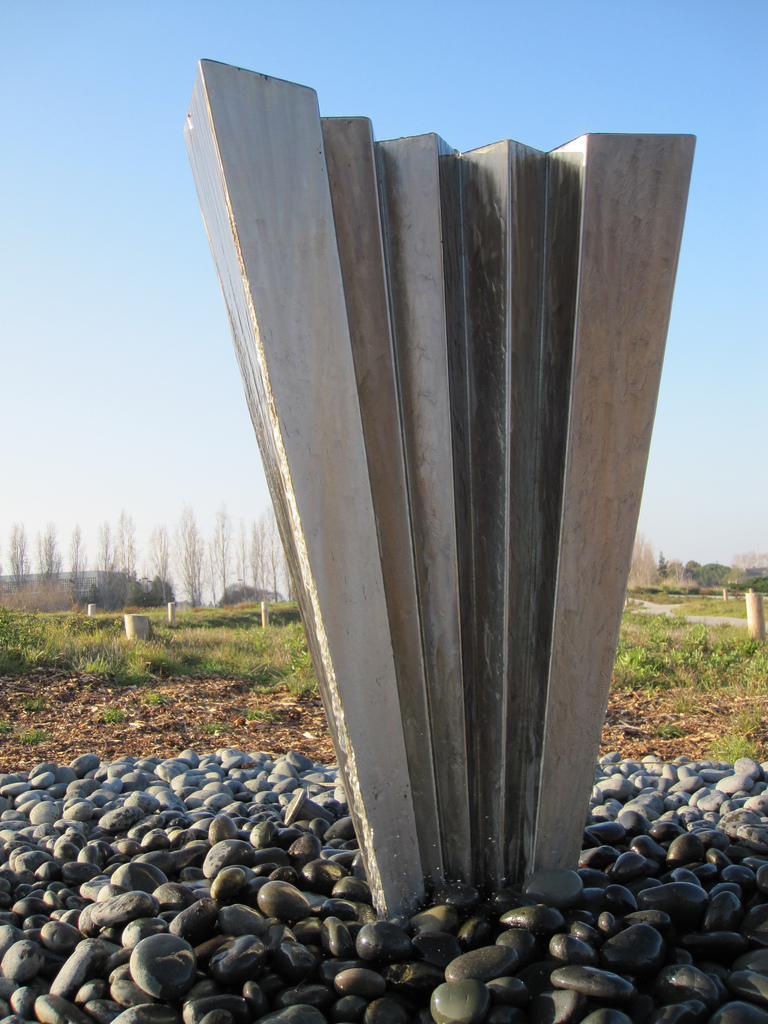

- Artist: Barton Rubenstein
- Year: 2008
- Medium: Stainless Steel Sculpture
- Movement: Modernism
- Subject: Water
- Dimensions: 180 cm × 97 cm (70 in × 38 in); 46 cm diameter (18 in)
- Location: Redwood Shores, California; 37°31′51″N 122°15′33″W
- Owner: Redwood City, California
- Website: www.rubensteinstudios.com/portfolio/ray-of-light/

Ray of Light, is a public artwork by artist Barton Rubenstein, located on the north side of the Redwood Shores Library, in Redwood City, California, United States. The sculpture, constructed from stainless steel, was commissioned as part of the G. R. Cress Bird Bath Project.

== Description ==
Like rays of light, this sculpture rises with vertical lines that fan upwards and outwards. Water passes over the top edges and glides down the sculpture's surfaces. With its brushed finish, Ray of Light emits a shimmering light that is magnified by its multiple articulated surfaces.

== Information ==
The sculpture is a functioning bird bath.

=== Acquisition ===
The Redwood City Culture Commission held a competition for artists to submit designs for bird baths with a deadline of October 1, 2007. They stated that the theme was open to interpretation as long as the finished work would supply birds with water. Sculpture purchased by Redwood City Civic Cultural Commission in 2008 as part of the G. R. Cress Bird Bath Project and installed in December 2008.

=== Location ===
The sculpture resides outside on the north end of the Redwood Shores branch of the Redwood City Public Library adjacent to the Belmont Slough.

== Artist ==
Barton Rubenstein creates indoor and outdoor sculpture with and without water for public and private spaces. These include state projects, corporate, commercial and academic institutions as well as private residences. He typically works with bronze, stainless steel, stone and glass. Interested in various elements of nature, Rubenstein focuses on water, kinetics, light, and suspension to create his sculptures.

== See also ==
- Public art
- Sculpture
