= Sunlight, West Virginia =

- Unincorporated community
- Location within West Virginia Location within the United States
- Coordinates: 37°59′13″N 80°27′41″W
- Country: United States
- State: West Virginia
- County: Greenbrier
- Elevation: 2,126 ft (648 m)
- Time zone: UTC-5 (Eastern (EST))
  - Summer (DST): UTC-4 (EDT)
- Area codes: 304 & 681
- GNIS feature ID: 1555754

Sunlight is an unincorporated community in Greenbrier County, West Virginia, United States. Sunlight is 6 miles (9.7 km) west of Falling Spring.

The community was named after the brand of shoes sold in the town store.
