= Lightning machine =

A lightning machine was a special effects device used in the film industry to simulate lightning flashes. It is part of the array of devices used to reproduce weather, exterior scenes, and other natural phenomena. These include the fog machine, wind machine, and storm towers. These devices were also employed in live showings of some cinemas, and in popular science exhibits. Accounts cited that the lightning machine requires a considerable amount of electricity, causing a noticeable drain on the lights. There was an incident when the enormous flashes it produced was interpreted as desperate calls for assistance by the fire department.

One of the earliest forms of lightning machines was recorded in ancient Greece. A list of stage contraptions, for instance, was described by Julius Pollux in his Onomasticon and part of this was the keraunoskopeion, which was a lightning machine.
