= Fog machine =

Device that emits a dense vapor that appears similar to fog or smoke

A fog machine, fog generator, or smoke machine is a device that emits a dense vapor that appears similar to fog or smoke. This artificial fog is most commonly used in professional entertainment applications. Fog machines can also be found in use in a variety of industrial, training, and some military applications. Typically, fog is created by vaporizing proprietary water and glycol-based or glycerin-based fluids or through the atomization of mineral oil. This fluid (often referred to colloquially as fog juice) vaporizes or atomizes inside the fog machine. Upon exiting the fog machine and mixing with cooler outside air, the vapor condenses, resulting in a thick, visible fog.

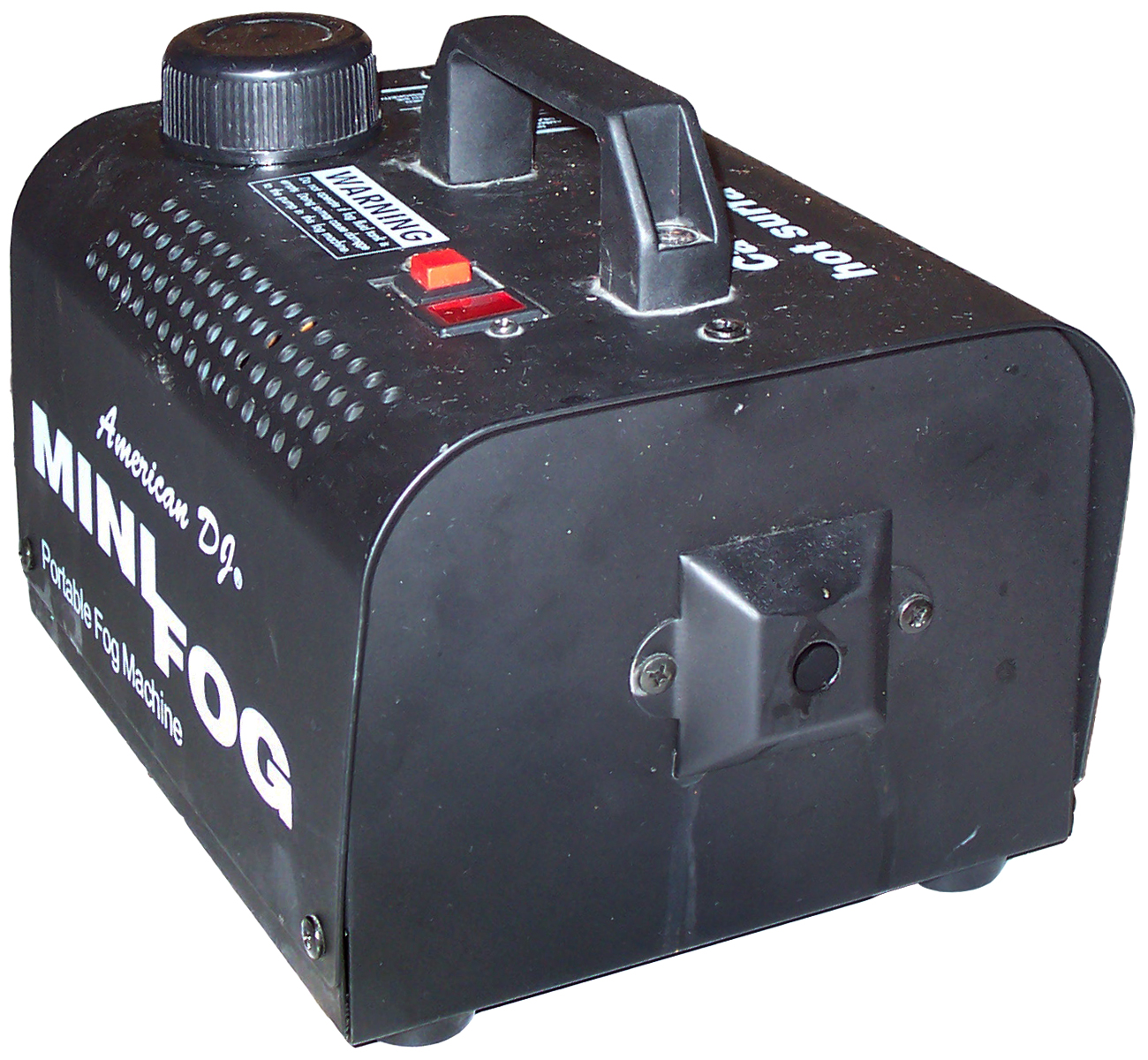
A small fog machine for residential use.

== Types ==
=== Heated ===
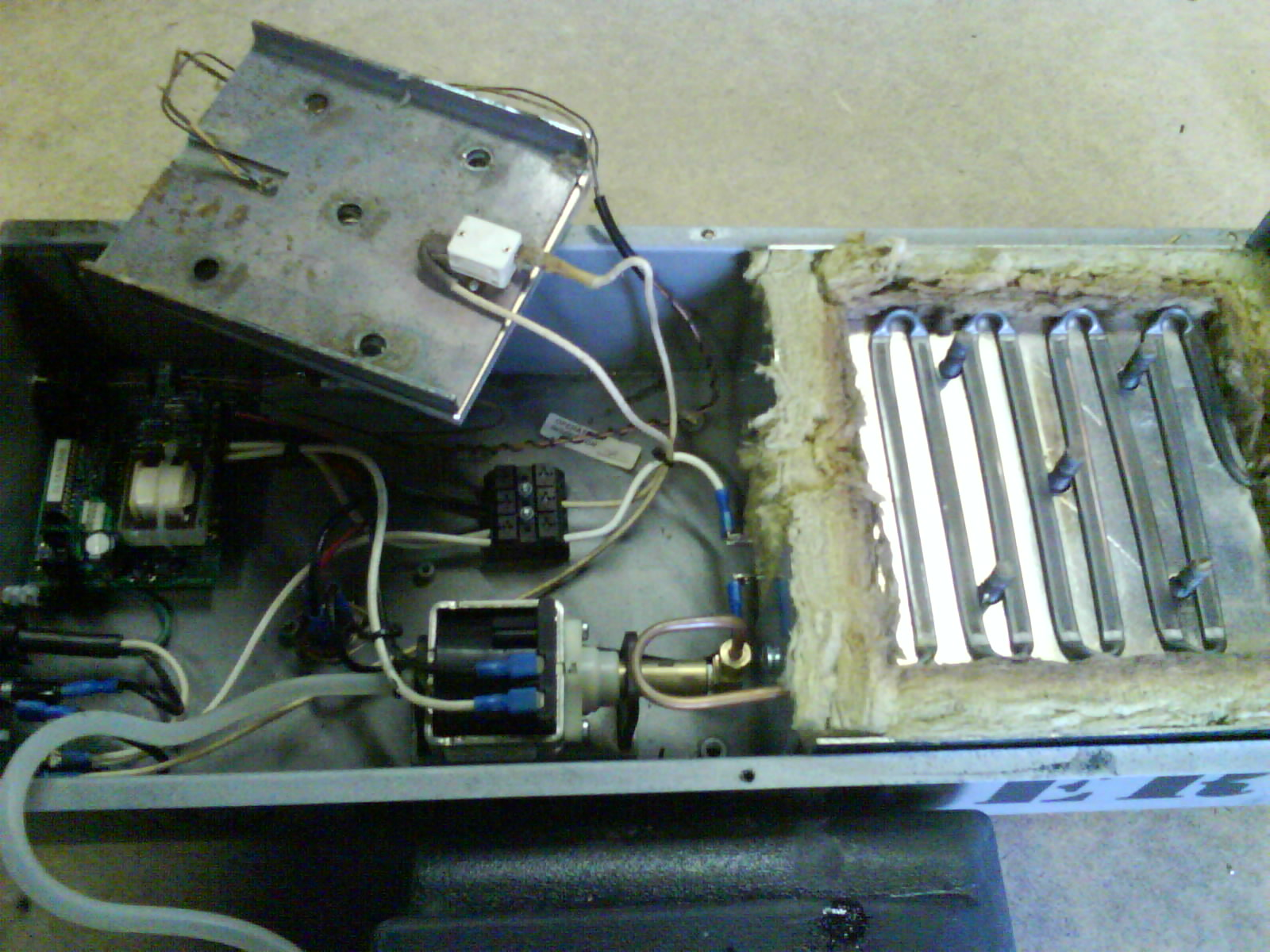
Interior view of a fog machine, showing the pump and heat exchanger.

Heated fog machines use either an inert gas or an electric pump to propel mineral oil, propylene glycol, or glycerin and water mixture into a heat exchanger, where the solution is vaporized. The most commonly encountered form of heated fog machine is the pump machine. Very basic models of this type of machine consist of a fluid reservoir, an electric pump to move the fog fluid, and a heat exchanger, which vaporizes the fluid. More complex models may include a variety of other features, including variable speed pumps to control the output of fog, timer modules, or components for remote operation and monitoring of the fog machines' status. Some manufacturers have produced accessories and fluids that when combined with an ordinary heated pump machine, create fog effects similar to chilled fog machines. Gas propelled fog machines use an inert gas (most commonly CO_{2} or nitrogen) to propel either mineral oil or a glycol based fluid into a heat exchanger, where it is vaporized into particles, creating a fog. Some models of gas propelled fog machine provide control over the output of fog by varying the volume of gas used to propel the fluid.

=== Chilled ===
Chilled fog machines are designed to create thick clouds of fog that lie close to the ground and dissipate as they rise. They are typically created by using either dry ice, compressed liquid CO_{2}, liquid nitrogen, ice or more recently liquid air.

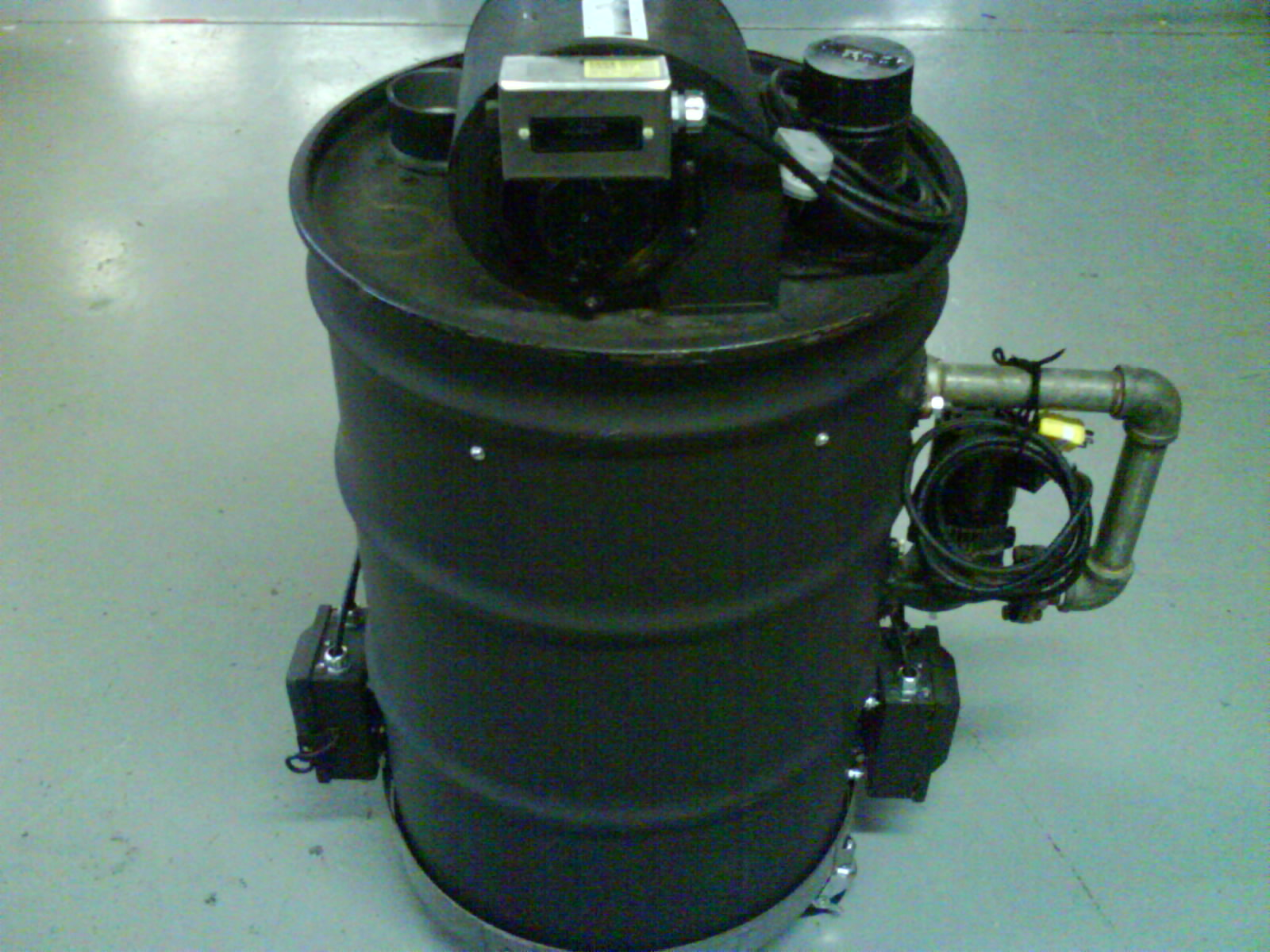
Generic Dry Ice machine made from a 3G. drum.

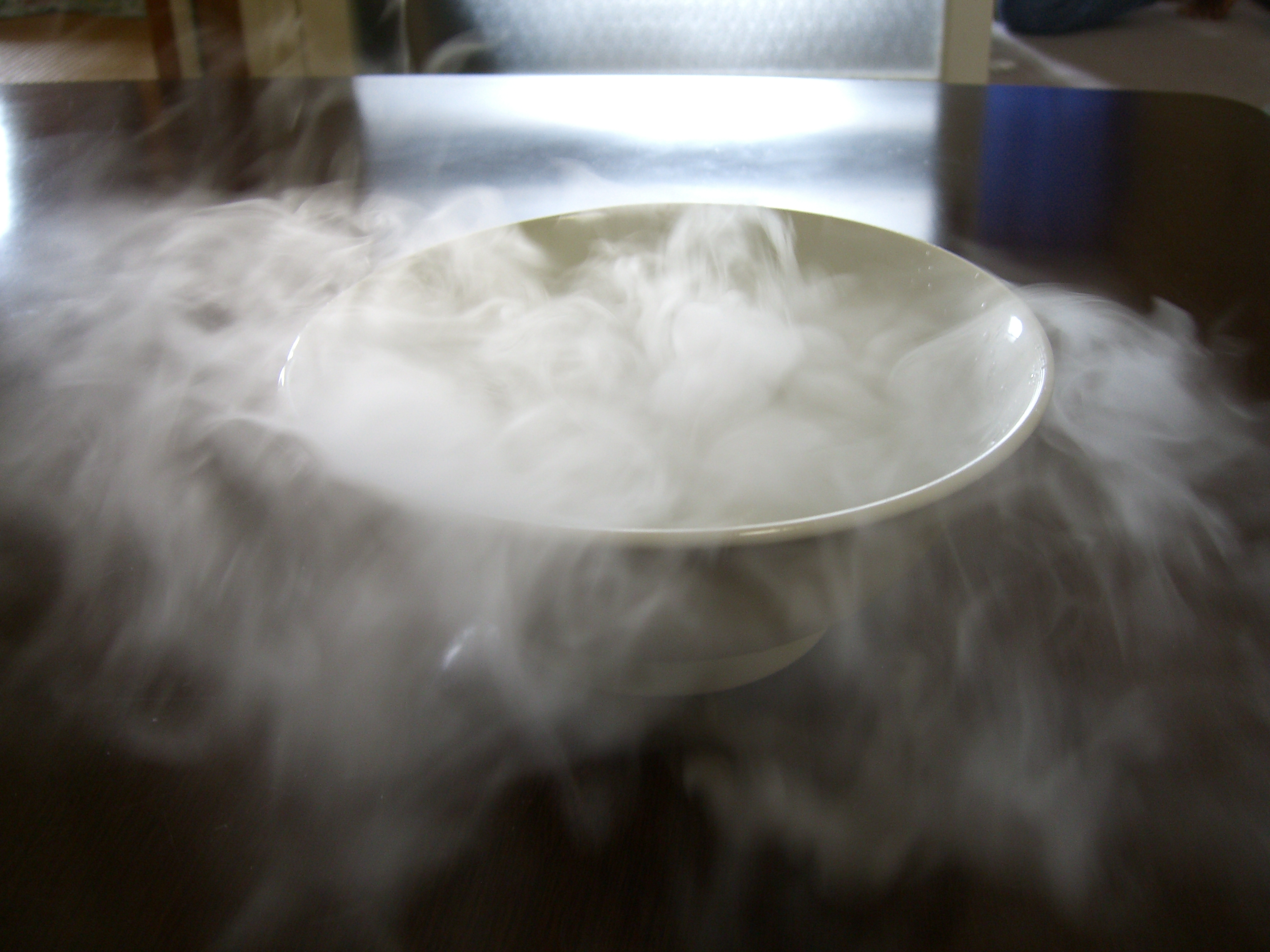
Sublimation of dry ice

Dry ice (solid CO_{2}) effects are produced by heating water to or near boiling in a suitable container (for example: a 55-gallon drum with water heater coils in it), and then dropping in one or more pieces of dry ice. Because at standard temperature and pressure carbon dioxide is a gas, the carbon dioxide sublimates and instantly produces a gas, condensing water vapor and creating a thick white fog. Liquid nitrogen (N_{2}) can be used in a similar manner to dry ice. In either case, a fan placed at the top of the container directs the fog where it is needed.

Liquid air is an alternative to using liquid nitrogen in generating low lying fog effects. Liquid air is composed of N_{2} and O_{2} mixed in a ratio of 79% nitrogen and 21% oxygen stored as a liquid in insulated cylinders. This ratio of nitrogen to oxygen is the same as that of atmospheric air, and indeed liquid air may be fabricated by simply liquefying atmospheric air. Liquid air can be used as a direct replacement for liquid nitrogen in chilled-fog effects and is intended to be used in the same manner in the same equipment. Its key advantage over liquid nitrogen is that it presents no asphyxiation hazard, since it contains oxygen. A disadvantage is that it supports combustion, whereas liquid nitrogen inhibits combustion.

== Uses ==
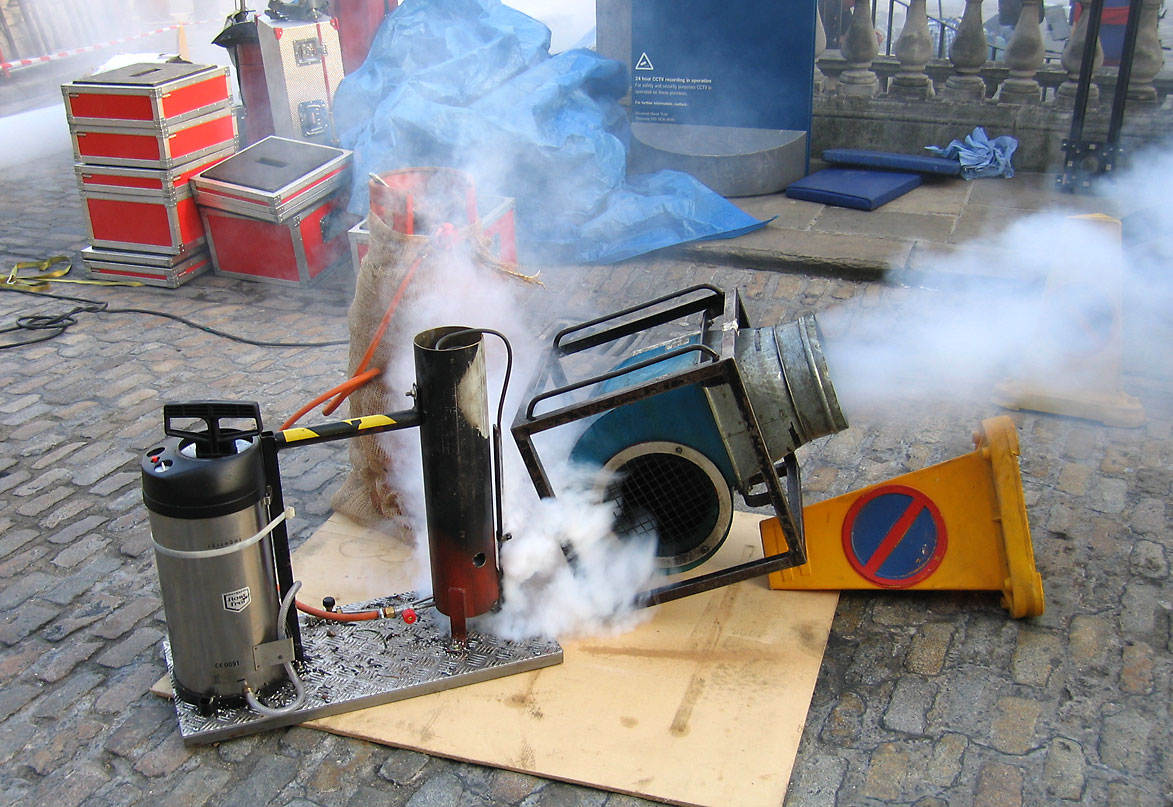
A heavy duty smoke machine feeding smoke into a blower to generate fog effects for open air location filming.

The versatility of fog machines make them appropriate for a wide variety of applications. Fog readily assists in creating a specific mood or feeling for a theatrical moment, and is often used in plays, such as Dracula, A Christmas Carol and Macbeth. Fog machines are also frequently used in Halloween displays such as haunted houses or forests. Because of greater availability and reductions in prices between 2003 and 2005, fog machines have become widely used for domestic Halloween presentations.

Fog machines are also useful for industrial applications including visualizing the flow of air, such highlighting drag over a surface in a wind tunnel or testing for leaks or filter effectiveness in air conditioning installations. Emergency and military services also use fog machines in their training regimens. Because of the reflective and refractive qualities of the smoke created by fog machines, they are often used in nightclubs and other entertainment venues to enhance the effects of lighting and laser arrangements, although they are being superseded by haze machines (see also light beam).

Several companies in Europe and Canada have developed rapid deployment fog machines for use as intrusion and hold-up security systems, intended to disorient an intruder by filling a room with fog when triggered by a panic button or other security device. These security smoke devices can produce between 300 and 1,000 cubic meters (11,000 and 35,000 cu ft) of smoke in 30 seconds and have been utilized in a wide variety of industries, including buildings requiring a high level of security, such as banks and jewelers, but also warehouses, offices, retail premises and in cash-handling chains. Concerns have been raised that these devices may cause criminals to panic and become violent to customers or staff. European Standard EN-8 specifically states that security smoke must not be installed in such a way as to create a mantrap.

=== Industrial uses ===
Ultra Low Volume (ULV) fogging is used by pest control industry and cleaning companies. ULV refers to the droplet size (between 20–30 micrometers (0.00079–0.00118 in)) generated by these fog machines. This fine droplet size is known as the optimum size for pest control. Traditional thermal fog machine technology has difficulty reaching crawling pests such as roaches, flea, and rodents due to the droplet size being too fine (less than 10 micrometers (0.00039 in)). It is often found that small droplets are blocked by the "air-curtain" of insects and rodents. Cold Fogging, in contrast, is heavy enough to penetrate these "air-curtains" as well as light enough to be evenly distributed within a room.

== Adverse health effects ==
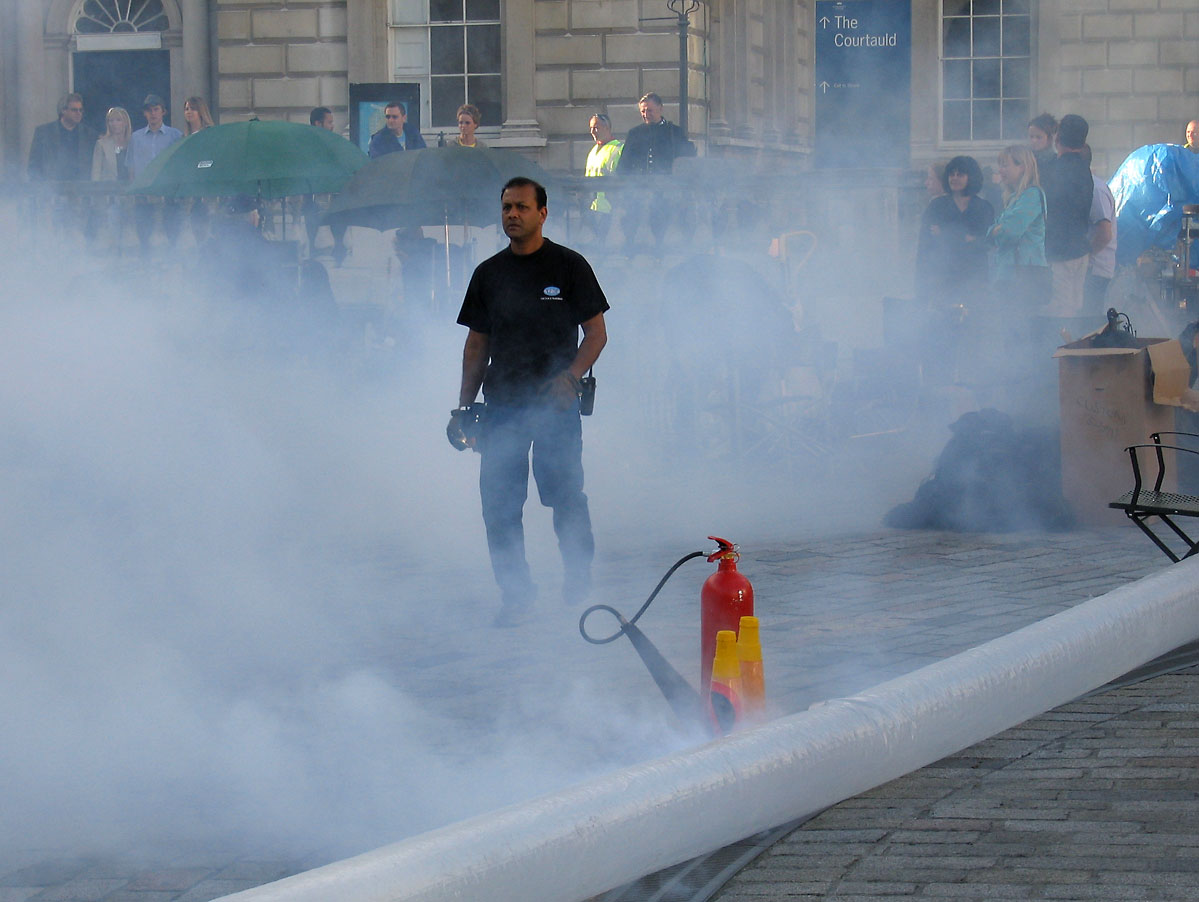
A special effects engineer positions the inflatable plastic tube feeding the smoke.

=== Dry ice- and liquid nitrogen-based fog ===
Atmospheric effects generated using water and dry ice or liquid nitrogen can present asphyxiation or breathing hazards. Both carbon dioxide and nitrogen displace ordinary air and the oxygen it contains, creating a risk of subtle anoxia (lack of oxygenation) for people working in these atmospheres. Adequate ventilation is essential to ensure that artists and technicians are surrounded by breathable air. Carbon dioxide has the added hazard of interfering with the normal breathing reflex, which is sensitive to carbon dioxide levels in the air. Nitrogen has no effect on the breathing reflex, but this creates its own hazard in that a person breathing pure nitrogen can lose consciousness from lack of oxygen without any warning signs.

=== Liquid air fog ===
Fog produced with liquid air does not present the hazards of carbon dioxide or liquid nitrogen because the liquid air has the same composition as ordinary atmospheric air (including the same level of breathable oxygen).

Fog machines which generate their effects solely using water, such as ultrasonic or pressurized technology, pose no special health risks, however "water-based" fog fluid commonly contains glycol or glycerin.

=== Glycerin-based fog ===
Glycerin has a boiling point of 290 °C (554F degrees), considerably higher than the temperature required for fog to be created. Thus, the thermostable range for glycerin is unlikely to be exceeded in normal commercial fogging operation, and so glycerin will not break down into other molecules due to heat at these temperatures.

Glycerin has been tested for safety in 62 tests by the National Institutes for Occupational Safety and Health (NIOSH). These tests include toxicity testing, eye irritation, skin irritation and several others.

=== Glycol-based fog ===
A number of studies have been published on the potential health effects presented by exposure to glycol-based theatrical fogs and artificial mists.

Two studies, a Health Hazard Evaluation completed in 1994 by the National Institute for Occupational Safety and Health, and another one in 2000 by the Department of Community and Preventative Medicine at the Mount Sinai School of Medicine and ENVIRON; both prepared for Actors Equity and the League of American Theaters and Producers, focused on the effects on actors and performers in Broadway musicals. The conclusion of both studies was that there was irritation of mucous membranes such as the eyes and the respiratory tract associated with extended peak exposure to theatrical fog. Exposure guidelines were outlined in the 2000 study that, it was determined, should prevent actors from suffering adverse impact to their health or vocal abilities.

Another study focused on the use of theatrical fog in the commercial aviation industry for emergency training of staff in simulated fire conditions. This study also found eye and respiratory tract irritation.

In May 2005, a study published in the American Journal of Industrial Medicine, conducted by the School of Environment and Health at the University of British Columbia, looked at adverse respiratory effects in crew members on a wide variety of entertainment venues ranging from live theaters, concerts, television and film productions to a video arcade. This study determined that cumulative exposure to mineral oil and glycol-based fogs were associated with acute and chronic adverse effects on respiratory health. This study found that short-term exposure to glycol fog was associated with coughing, dry throat, headaches, dizziness, drowsiness, and tiredness. This study also found long-term exposure to smoke and fog was associated with both short-term and long-term respiratory problems such as chest tightness and wheezing. Personnel working closest to the fog machines had reduced lung function results.

The Professional Lighting and Sound Association has compiled a standard for theatrical fogs or artificial mists compositions for use in entertainment venues that "are not likely to be harmful to otherwise healthy performers, technicians, or audience members of normal working age, which is 18 to 64 years of age, inclusive." This standard was based primarily (though not exclusively) upon the findings of a report commissioned for them by the Cohen Group and applies to only those fog fluid compositions that consist of a mixture of water and glycol (so-called "water based" fog fluid).

Short-term exposure to glycol fog can be associated with headaches, dizziness, drowsiness and tiredness. Long-term exposure to smoke and fog can be related to upper airway and voice symptoms. Extended (multi-year) exposure to smoke and fog has been associated with both short-term and long-term respiratory health problems. Efforts should be made to reduce exposure to theatrical smoke to as low a level as possible. The use of digital effects in post-production on film and television sets can be considered a safer practise than using theatrical smoke and fog during filming, although this is not always practical.

=== Fine particulate matter (PM₂.₅) ===
Fog machines operate by heating glycol‑ or mineral‑oil‑based fluids to produce an aerosol that creates a visible cloud. The thermal vaporization of propylene glycol and glycerin used in many fog fluids is similar to the aerosol‑generation mechanism found in electronic nicotine delivery systems (ENDS), such as electronic cigarettes.

Although fog machine aerosols can fall within the size range of fine particulate matter (PM₂.₅), most evaluations of fog machine emissions have not reported PM₂.₅ concentrations in the micrograms‑per‑cubic‑meter (µg/m³) units used in ambient air‑quality regulation. PM₂.₅ exposure is associated with severe systemic inflammation, cardiovascular disease, and premature death.

Industry guidance documents typically report fog machine aerosol concentrations in milligrams per cubic meter (mg/m³), with recommended exposure levels of 10–40 mg/m³ for glycol‑based fogs. Because 1 mg/m³ equals 1,000 µg/m³, these recommended levels correspond to 10,000–40,000 µg/m³—concentrations far above the PM₂.₅ levels classified as “Unhealthy,” “Very Unhealthy,” or “Hazardous” in U.S. Environmental Protection Agency air‑quality guidelines.

Earlier evaluations reported only total aerosol concentrations and did not measure size‑fractionated particulate matter such as PM₂.₅.

Peer‑reviewed studies published in 2022 and 2023 have begun to characterize the particulate and chemical composition of glycol‑based fog aerosols. Guo et al. (2022) found that fog machines produced substantial amounts of ultrafine particulate matter and elevated indoor concentrations of formaldehyde and other carbonyl compounds. A follow‑up study by Guo et al. (2023) demonstrated that glycols commonly used in artificial fogs undergo autoxidation, producing toxic carbonyls through reactions with indoor oxidants. Long‑term health effects of chronic exposure to fog machine aerosols have not been evaluated in epidemiological studies, and existing research has focused primarily on short‑term irritation and peak exposure events rather than cumulative PM₂.₅ exposure.

== Haze machines ==
Haze machines, also called haze generators or hazers, produce atmospheric effects (haze) which tend to be less dense than that of fog machines, allowing them to be used in creating more subtle looks. Depending on a venue's or location's ventilation, this haze can stay in the air for hours. Because of the small particle size of the output from hazers, under 5 micrometres, a hazer typically takes longer to fill the same volume of space with a visible effect relative to a fog machine.

== See also ==
- Dry ice
- Haze machine
- Powder photography
- Theatrical smoke and fog
- Composition of electronic cigarette aerosol
- Vortex ring toy
