= Barton Rubenstein =

American sculptor

- Born: 1962 (age 63–64); Washington, DC
- Education: Haverford College, Weizmann Institute of Science, Corcoran College of Art and Design
- Notable work: Water, Wind Kinetic and Vertical Sculptures
- Website: www.RubensteinStudios.com

Barton Rubenstein (born 1962) is an American sculptor who works in water sculpture, wind kinetic sculpture, and vertical sculpture in suspension. Trained as a scientist and engineer, he brings a technical perspective to his art, applying principles of physics, mechanics, and visual perception to the development of his sculptural systems. His sculptures are typically defined by modernist forms, precise fabrication, and an emphasis on the interplay between structure, movement, and the natural elements.

== Early life and education ==
Rubenstein was born in 1962 and raised in Washington, D.C. His mother, Daryl Reich Rubenstein, was an art historian and curator at the Smithsonian Institution. He attended Sidwell Friends School. . His childhood included hands-on building projects with his father, Lee Rubenstein, a real estate developer, and outdoor activities such as sailing and canoeing, experiences that later informed his interest in environmental forces as artistic material.

He received a Bachelor of Science in physics with a minor in art from Haverford College in 1985. Rubenstein then attended the Weizmann Institute of Science in Israel, where he earned a Master of Science in Mathematics and Computer Science (1990) and a Ph.D. in Neuroscience (1994).

== Scientific career ==
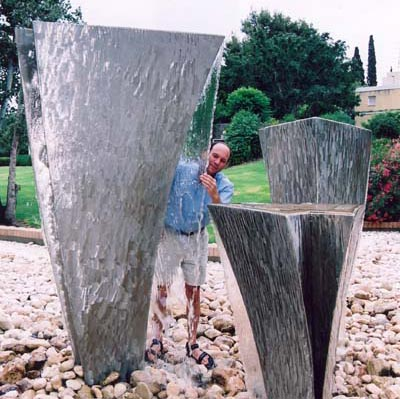
Water Sculpture • "Oasis," by Barton Rubenstein, 2004, Weizmann Institute of Science, Israel

At the Weizmann Institute of Science, Rubenstein’s research focused on visual perception. Working with Professor Dov Sagi, he contributed to resolving a longstanding question in visual psychophysics concerning how the human visual system easily distinguishes complex textures; the findings were published in the Optical Society of America in 1990. His subsequent work investigated the consolidation of perceptual learning in the human brain. Research published in Science (1994) demonstrated that improvement in visual discrimination tasks requires a consolidation period of at least six hours and identified rapid-eye-movement (REM) sleep as the stage during which this process occurs. These studies informed subsequent research on learning and sleep and were discussed in publications such as Scientific American and The New York Times.

== Transition to Sculpture ==
Rubenstein’s scientific and engineering background continues to inform his practice; he applies principles from physics, mechanics, and visual perception to the design of his water sculptures, wind kinetic mechanisms, and suspended forms. His sculptures are typically fabricated in stainless steel or bronze and range from human-scale works to large outdoor installations.

Rubenstein's path as a public artist has also been shaped by the legacy of past great and renowned artists, whose work continues to inform his vision. His relationship with the late George Rickey, whose precise approach to movement and balance revealed the poetry of kinetic form, and his friendship with Kenneth Snelson, whose innovative use of stainless steel and cable expanded his understanding of structure, together helped define a sculptural language grounded in motion, engineering, and refined materiality.

Rubenstein has over 100 public art commissions worldwide and has been awarded over a dozen major National Public Art Competitions in the United States and has been commissioned to create the Portrait of a Nation Award for the Smithsonian Institution's National Portrait Gallery, an award that is presented biennially to prominent Americans that have made a significant contribution to the country. Rubenstein also has one of his wind-kinetic sculptures on permanent display at the official residence of the Vice President of the United States.

== Mother Earth Project ==
In 2015, Rubenstein and his family founded the Mother Earth Project, (MEP), a nonprofit environmental arts initiative that promotes global sustainability and climate awareness through artistic engagement. The project comprises three principal art-based initiatives: Parachutes for the Planet, Mother Earth Murals, and the Mother Earth Sculptures. Parachutes for the Planet invites individuals and communities worldwide to create decorated parachutes with environmental messages and pledges, which are displayed at events and presented to policymakers. Mother Earth Murals transform public spaces into visual statements about the climate and sustainability, and Mother Earth Sculptures are large-scale public art works installed in cities as symbols of environmental commitment. As of 2025, MEP reports participation in more than 80 countries and 45 U.S. states across its programs, with goals to expand the reach of parachute, mural, and sculpture initiatives globally.

== Honors and awards ==
Rubenstein has received a range of recognitions for his artistic and civic work, including awards from educational, governmental, and industry organizations:

- Creativity Award, Moment Magazine (2013)

He also served on a National Academies committee in 2005 that advised on the redesign of U.S. currency, contributing recommendations incorporated into the current $100 bill.

== Tennis and Ultimate Frisbee ==
Rubenstein began playing tennis at age six and competed on the varsity team at Sidwell Friends School in Washington, D.C., where the team won four consecutive city championships. He subsequently played Division III tennis at Haverford College. While at the Weizmann Institute of Science in Israel, he was recruited in 1988 to compete in the national league representing the city of Ramla, and also competed as a part-time professional player in Challenger-level tournaments in Israel. After returning to the United States, Rubenstein continued to compete at the masters level in USTA events, winning tournaments in Leesburg, Virginia; Norbeck Country Club, Maryland; and College Park, Maryland. In 2022, he represented the United States at the 21st Maccabiah Games, earning a bronze medal in men’s 60s singles. He subsequently won consecutive titles (2023, 2024) at the USTA Level 2 National Red Clay Court Championships in Kearny, New Jersey, and in 2025 won a silver ball at the USTA National Championships in men’s 60s doubles in New Orleans, Louisiana. In 2025, Rubenstein reached career-high USTA rankings of No. 3 in doubles and No. 5 in singles, and achieved an ITF world ranking of No. 48 in doubles.

In ultimate frisbee, Rubenstein co-founded the first team at Sidwell Friends School, which also won four consecutive city championships and competed in the 1981 East Coast High School Championships. While living in Israel, he and Dr. Robert Strell co-founded the early development of ultimate frisbee in the country, beginning with a regular weekly game in Tel Aviv that has continued for decades. These early efforts contributed to the establishment of the Israeli Flying Disc Association, which has since grown to include hundreds of participants and leagues in multiple cities. The Tel Aviv game also helped inspire the creation of Ultimate Peace, a nonprofit organization that brings together Israeli and Palestinian youth through the sport. Rubenstein has described the introduction and development of ultimate frisbee in Israel as one of his most meaningful accomplishments.

== Personal life ==
Rubenstein resides in Maryland with his wife and has three children.

== Bibliography ==
- Muller, Paige and Andrea Seiger, "22 Walks in Washington, DC that you must not miss," 2025.
- Goldman, Linda, "Climate Change and Youth: Turning Grief and Anxiety into Action," Routledge Publishers, 2022
- "Masters in Landscape and Public Sculpture," Phoenix Publishing, 2012.
- Rooney, Ashley, "100 Artists of the Mid-Atlantic," Schiffer Publishing, 2011.
- "Public Art, A World's Eye View: Integrating Art into the Environment," ICO Publishers, 2007.
- Goode, James M., "Washington Sculpture: A Cultural History of Outdoor Sculpture in the Nations Capital," Johns Hopkins University Press, 2008.
