= Light beam =

Projection of light energy

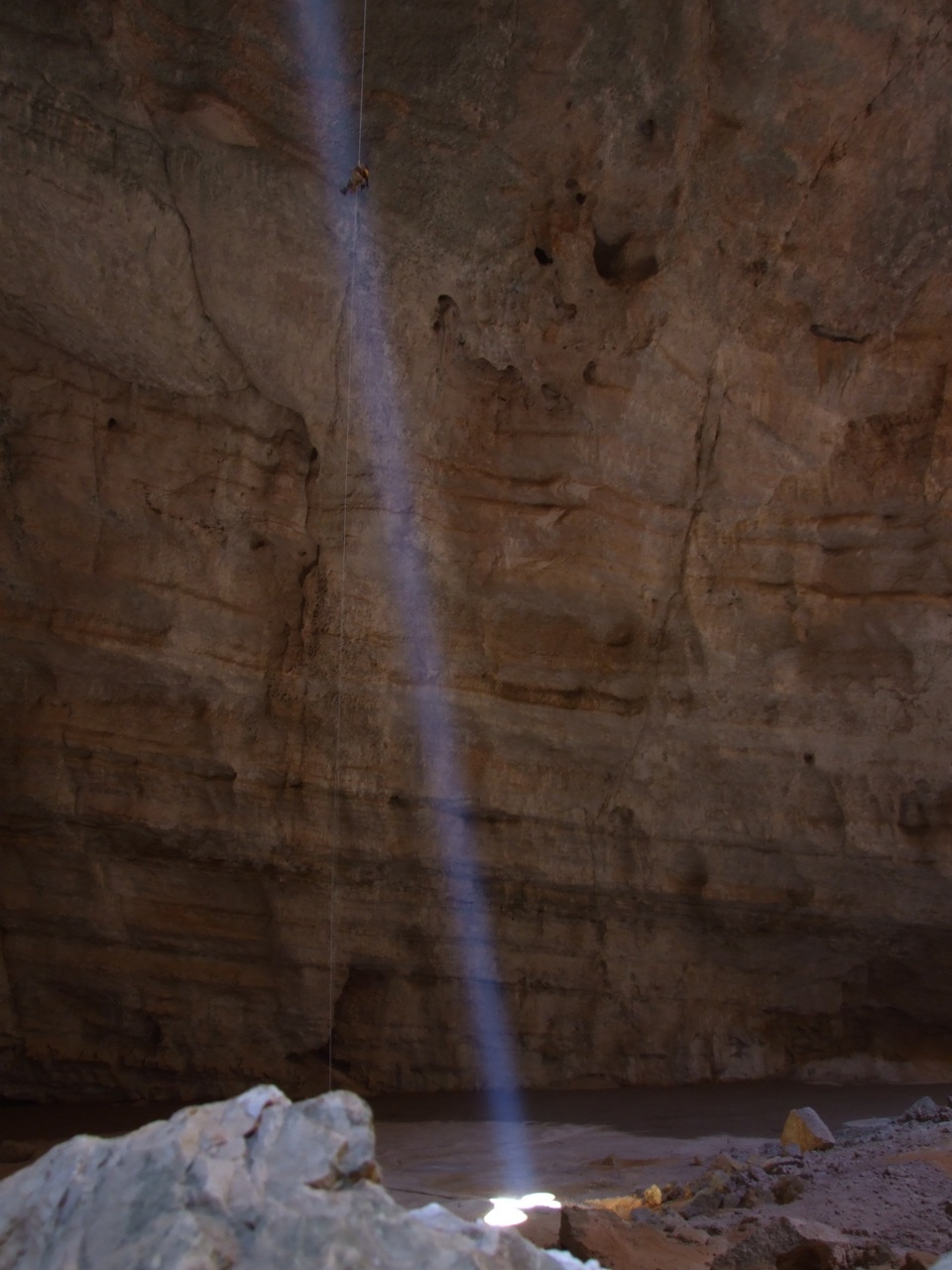
A natural lightbeam in the Majlis al-Jinn (lit. 'Meeting place of the jinn') cave in Oman

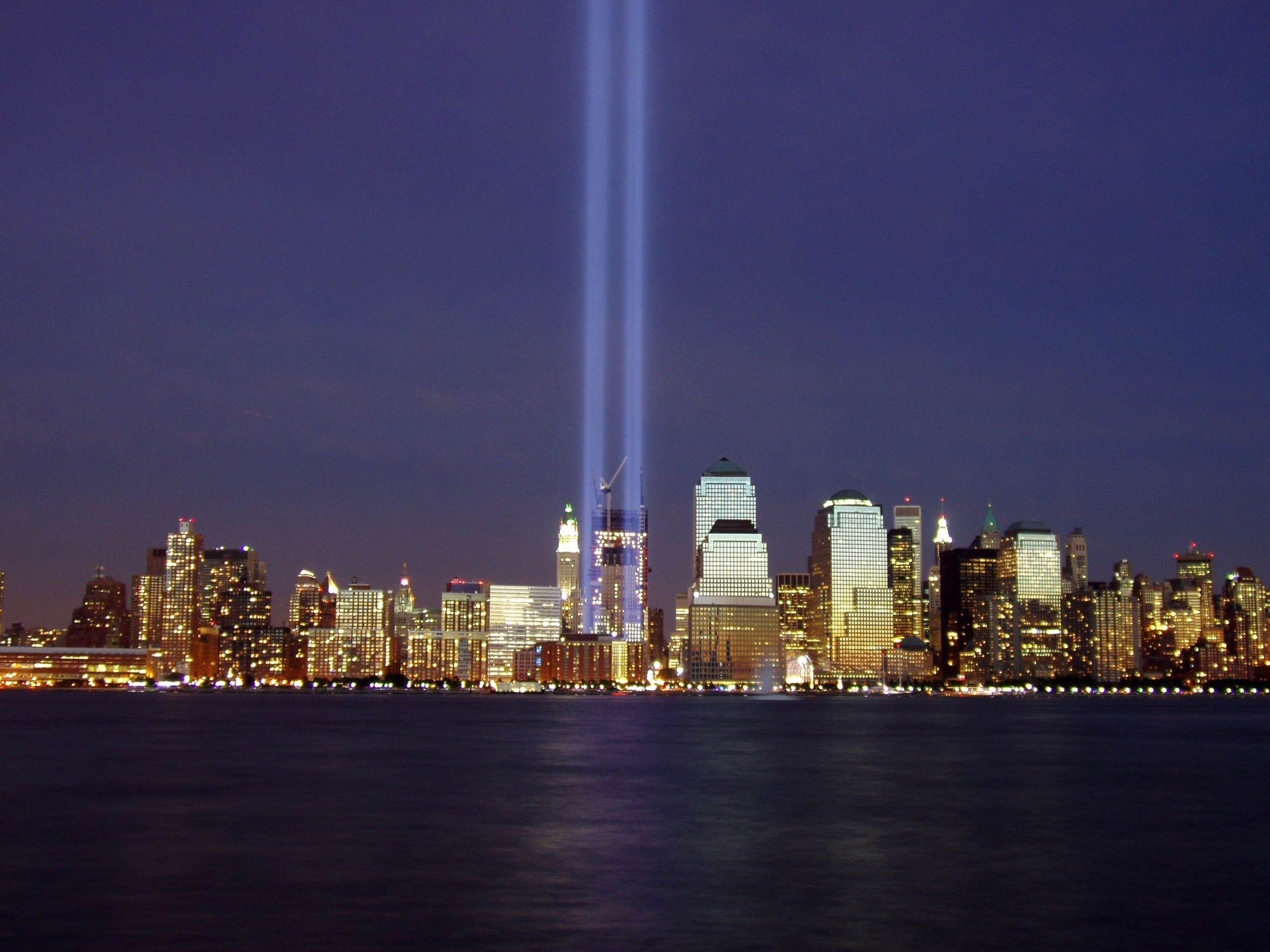
Light beams were used to symbolize the missing towers of the World Trade Center as part of the Tribute in Light.

A light beam or beam of light is a directional projection of light energy radiating from a light source. Sunlight forms a light beam (a sunbeam) when filtered through media such as clouds, foliage, or windows. To artificially produce a light beam, a lamp and a parabolic reflector is used in many lighting devices such as spotlights, car headlights, PAR Cans, and LED housings. Light from certain types of laser has the smallest possible beam divergence.

== Visible light beams ==
From the side, a beam of light is only visible if part of the light is scattered by objects: tiny particles like dust, water droplets (mist, fog, rain), hail, snow, or smoke, or larger objects such as birds. If there are many objects in the light path, then it appears as a continuous beam, but if there are only a few objects, then the light is visible as a few individual bright points. In any case, this scattering of light from a beam, and the resultant visibility of a light beam from the side, is known as the Tyndall effect.

=== Visibility from the side as side effect ===
- Flashlight (UK 'Torch'), beam directed by hand
- Headlight, forward beam; the lamp is mounted in a vehicle, or on the forehead of a person, e.g. built into a helmet
- Lighthouse, beam sweeping around horizontally
- Searchlight, beam directed at something

=== Visibility from the side as purpose ===
For the purpose of visibility of light beams from the side, sometimes a haze machine or fog machine is used. The difference between the two is that the fog itself is also a visual effect.

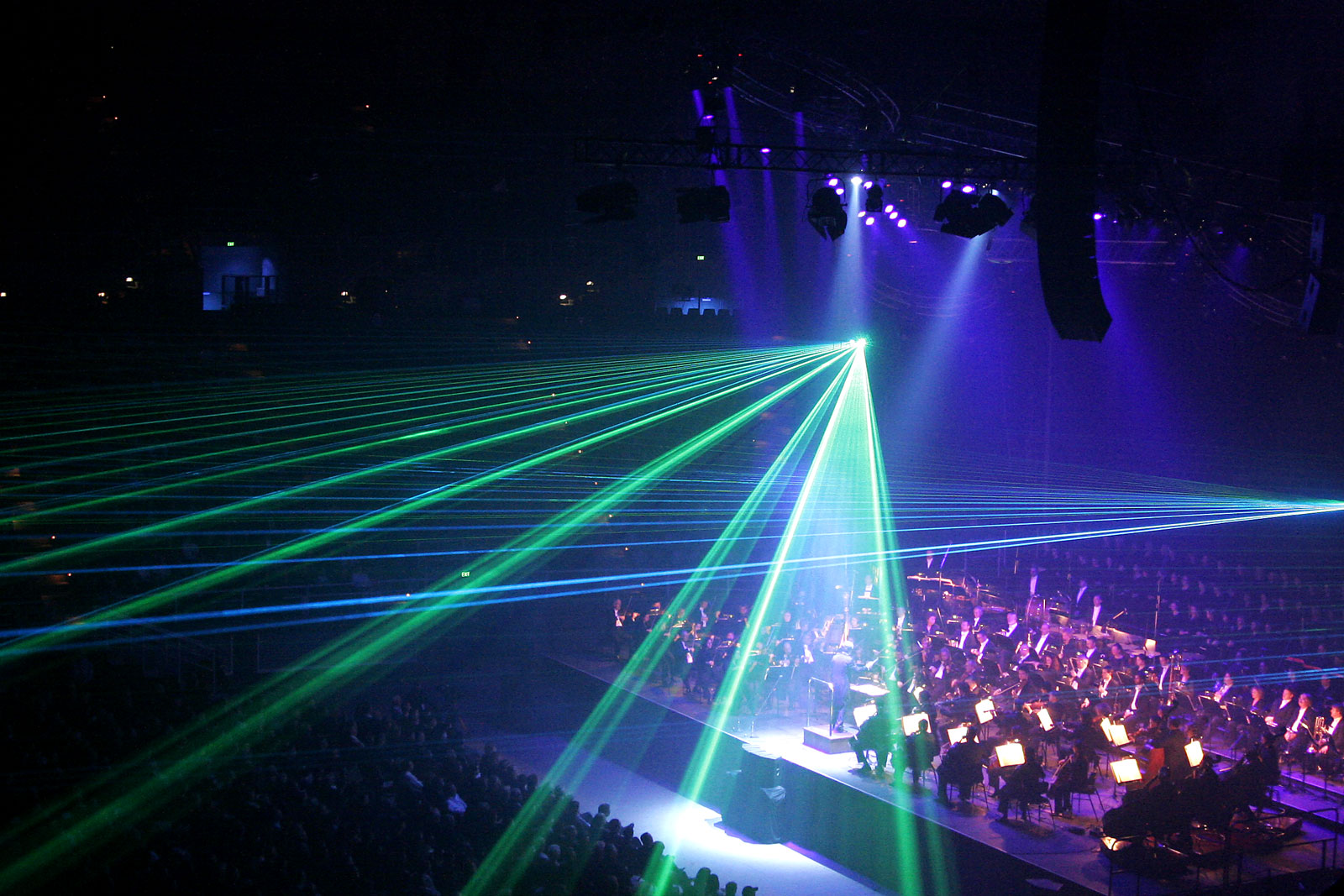
Laser beams used for visual effects during a musical performance

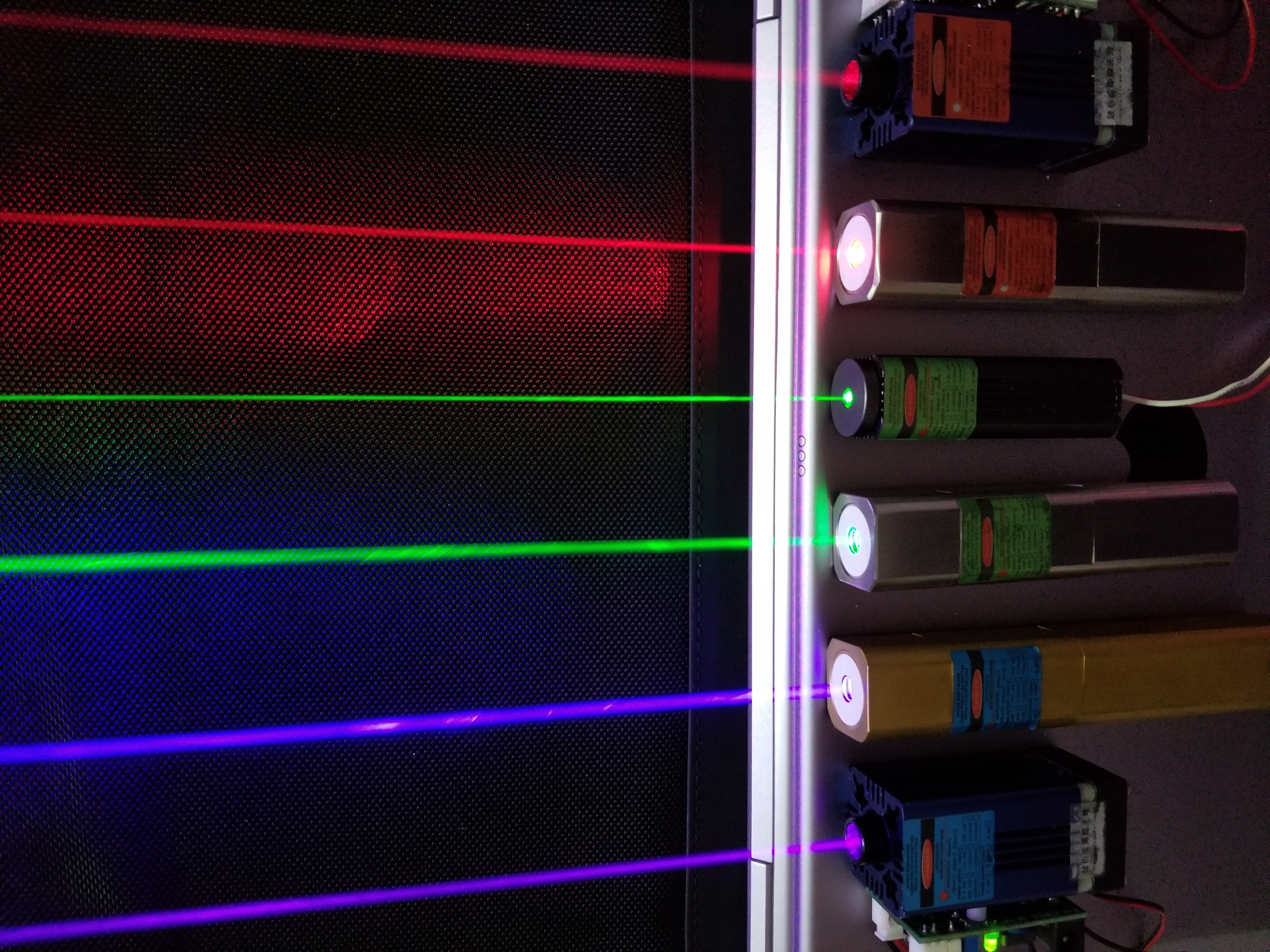
Laser beams with different wavelengths (405nm - 660nm).

- Laser lighting display- Laser beams are often used for visual effects, often in combination with music.
- Searchlights are often used in advertising, for instance by automobile dealers; the beam of light is visible over a large area, and (at least in theory) interested persons can find the dealer or store by following the beam to its source. This also used to be done for movie premieres; the waving searchlight beams are still to be seen as a design element in the logo of the 20th Century Fox movie studio.

== Other applications ==
- Optical communication
  - Infrared Data Association (IrDA) standards
  - Infrared remote control
- Security alarms
- Fibre optics
- Laser pointer
- Laser sight
- List of applications for lasers

== See also ==
- Beam diameter
- Collimated beam
- Crepuscular rays
- Light pillar, atmospheric optical phenomena
- Pencil beam
- Ray (optics)
- Relativistic beaming
