= Sun Ray (disambiguation) =

Sun Ray is a thin-client workstation computer.

Sun Ray or Sunray may also refer to:

== Natural world ==
- Sunbeam, a beam of sunlight
- A plant of genus Enceliopsis
- The common name of the Western Australian daisy Rhodanthe manglesii

== Music ==
- The Sunrays, a pop music band managed by Murry Wilson
- "Sunray", a song by The Jesus and Mary Chain from their 1989 album Automatic
- "Sunray", a song by Riley Armstrong from his 2000 album Riley Armstrong
- "Sunray", a song by Hawkwind from their 2005 album Take Me to Your Leader
- "Sun Ray", a song by Mutemath from their 2011 album Odd Soul

== Places ==
- Sunray, Oklahoma
- Sunray, Texas
- King George's and Sunray (ward), ward in London, England

== Other ==
- Sunray, Swiss food manufacturer
- Sun Ray Photo Company, a manufacturer of photo equipment
- Sunray, a term used in radio voice procedure
- Sunrays (yacht), a super-yacht built by Oceanco in 2010
- Operation Riviresa, also known as Operation Sunrays
