= Knott's Scary Farm =

Seasonal Halloween event

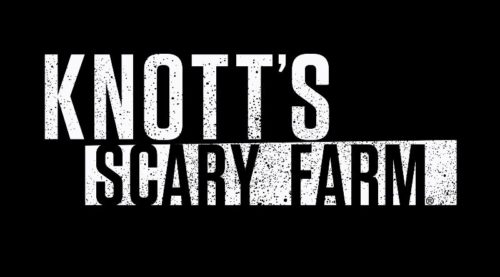
- Genre: Halloween
- Frequency: Annual
- Locations: Knotts Berry Farm; 33°50′39″N 118°00′01″W
- Years active: 1973–2019, 2021–
- Inaugurated: 1973; 53 years ago
- Website: Official website

Knott's Scary Farm or Knott's Halloween Haunt is a seasonal Halloween event at Knott's Berry Farm in Buena Park, California. It is an event in which the theme park is transformed into "160 acres of horror", via a series of roaming monsters, terrifying haunted houses and 'scare zones'. As of 2010, it was said to be the first, largest and longest-running Halloween event to be held at a theme park.

== Current attractions ==
- Origins: The Curse Of Calico (FINAL YEAR)
- Cinema Slasher
- Room 13
- The Chilling Chambers (FINAL YEAR)
- Eight Fingers Nine: The Boogeyman
- Widows
- The Zoo
- Mary: The Haunting of Worth Home
- Unearthed (NEW)
- Inked (NEW)

== Attraction History ==
Knott's Scary Farm Attraction History
#	Year	Mazes	Scare Zones	Shows	Notes
1	1973	The Monster Maze; Satan's Saw Mill; The Ghostway Express	Ghost Town		
2	1974	The Haunted Shack; The Devil's Log Ride; Calico Phantom's Mine Ride; Transylvania Railroad; Stagecoach Ride through Wolfman Country	Ghost Town		
3	1975	Terror Mountain; Knott's Scary Tales; Trail of the Tortured; Haunted Mine; Transylvania Railroad; Trail of the Headless Horseman	Ghost Town; The Gory '20s Fiesta de Fiends	The Hanging	
4	1976	Trail of the Tortured; Terror Mountain; Haunted Mine; Trail of the Headless Horseman; Knott's Scary Tales; Transylvania Express; Gasoline Alley (Thru Sleepy Hollow)	Ghost Town	Dead Man's Hanging	
5	1977	Ten Chilling Chambers (first standalone walk-through maze); Terror Mountain; Haunted Mine; Gasoline Alley (Thru Sleepy Hollow); Transylvania Express; The Ghost Coach; Witch's Twist; Bump the Ghoul; Knott's Scary Tales	Ghost Town	The Hanging	
6	1978	The Trail of Terror; Terror Mountain; Haunted Mine; Knott's Scary Tales	Ghost Town		
7	1979	Chilling Chambers of Horrors; Black Bart's Trail of Terror; Terror Mountain; Haunted Mine; Knott's Scary Tales	Ghost Town	Monsters' Revenge	
8	1980	The Tomb of Terror; Dr. Alucard's Chamber of Horrors; Terror Mountain; Haunted Mine; Knott's Scary Tales	Ghost Town	Midnight Witch Hanging	
9	1981	The Trail of Terror; Terror Mountain; Haunted Mine; Knott's Scary Tales	Ghost Town	Midnight Witch Hanging	
10	1982	The Terrifying Trail of Jack the Ripper; The Mysterious Corridors; Terror Mountain; Haunted Mine; Knott's Scary Tales	Ghost Town	Assorted Performances (The Headless Woman, Spidora, The Phantom of the Opera, Dracula's Hands); Congress of Human Oddities (Swordini, Miss Volta, Twistina, & Flamo); Dr. Lovecraft's Magical Mystery Tour; Halloween Dance Party; Knott's Ghoul Revue starring Elvira; Rock Dancing to X-Caliber; The Hanging; The Haunting Illusions of Mark Kalin; The Strange Case of Dr. Cleaver; Tony Angelo: The Hilarious Hypnotist	
11	1983	The Realm of Darkness; Corridors of Mystery; Terror Mountain; Haunted Mine; Transylvania Taxi	Ghost Town	Midnight Witch Hanging; Elvira's Second Year, New Show!	
12	1984	Caverns of Doom; The House of Red Death; Terror Mountain; Haunted Mine	Ghost Town	Midnight Witch Hanging; Elvira's Ghoul Review	
13	1985	The Terrifying House of Doom; Creep House; Trail of the Doomed; Terror Mountain; Trails of Terror; Dragon's Caverns; Sorcerer's Lair	Ghost Town	Midnight Witch Hanging	
14	1986	Mystical Maze of Madness; The Best Little Horror House; Conviks Haven; The Last Train to Terror; Nightmare Mountain; The Dark Forest of the Sorcerer	Ghost Town	Midnight Witch Hanging; Elvira's Shock & Rock Spooktacular	
15	1987	Curse of the Sphinx; Kingdom of the Dinosaurs; Metro Madness; Realm of the Sorcerer; The Slaughterhouse; The Enemy Within; The Fourth Dimension; The Return of Zulu	Ghost Town	Midnight Witch Hanging	
16	1988	Bait's Motel; Camp Hatchet Head; Revenge of the Dead; The Dark; Threshold of Doom; Toxic Terror; Uncle Ernie's Madhouse	Ghost Town	Midnight Witch Hanging; Elvira's Shock & Rock Revue	
17	1989	Bait's Motel; Camp Hatchet Head; Revenge of the Dead; Terror Mountain; The Dark; Threshold of Doom; Uncle Ernie's Madhouse; Which Maze	Ghost Town	The Chain Gang; The Hanging; Elvira's Rock'n Horror Show	
18	1990	Bait's Motel; Encounters of Darkness; The Fear; Threshold of Doom; Terror Mountain; Revenge of the Dead; Uncle Ernie's Madhouse; Timothy L. Eerie Time Machine	Ghost Town	The Hanging; Elvira's Rock'n Horror Show	
19	1991	Bait's Motel; Encounters of Darkness; Revenge of the Dead; Terror Mountain; The Body; The Fear; Threshold of Doom; Uncle Ernie's Madhouse	Ghost Town	Dr. Cleaver Strikes Again... and Again... And... Dr. Deranged and his Mad Music Monsters (Pirate Radio 100.3 FM presents Tattoo Rodeo and The Scream); Elvira's Truth or Scare; Laser Music Madness; The Bizarre World of Rudy Coby; The Hanging; Michael Griffin: The Houdini Challenge!	
20	1992	Kingdom of the Lounge Lizards; Lair of the Vampyre; Mother Noose's Scary Tales; Revenge of the Dead; Temple of Sacrifice; Terror Mountain; Toxichem; Uncle Ernie's Madhouse	Ghost Town	The Hanging; Elvira Dead, White & Blue	
21	1993	House of Maniacs; Jaws of Death; Lair of the Vampyre; Mother Noose's Scary Tales; Nightmares; Santa Claws Mountain; Temple of Sacrifice; Toxichem	Ghost Town	Ed Alonzo's Closet Tricks; The Hanging; Elvira's Shock N' Rock Revue	
22	1994	Carnival of Death; Cavern of Carnage; House of Maniacs; Industrial Evil; Lair of the Vampyre; Mother Noose's Scary Tales; Nightmares; Santa Claws Mountain; Slasher of the Dark; Toxichem	Ghost Town	Day of the Dead Procession; Dr. Cleaver in the Clink; Ed Alonzo Comedy; HTV-Terrorvision; Laser Music Madness; Mystery Lodge; The Hanging: Stop the Insanity! Tony Angelo: The Incredible Hypnotist	
23	1995	Carnival of Death; Cavern of Carnage; Curse of the Werewolf; Dominion of the Dead; Ghost Town Dead and Breakfast; House of Maniacs; Industrial Evil; Nightmares; Santa Claws Mountain; Slasher of the Dark	Ghost Town	Cyber Insanity; Day of the Dead Procession; Ed Alonzo's Magic & Mayhem; Knott's Gory Tales: Starring the Crypt Keeper; Laser Music Madness; Leave it to Cleaver; Mystery Lodge; The Hanging: It's Always Marsha, Marsha, Marsha!	
24	1996	Camp Gonnagetcha; Carnival of Death; Curse of the Werewolf; Cavern of Carnage; Dominion of the Dead; Ghost Town Dead and Breakfast; House of Maniacs; Kingdom of the Lounge Lizards; Nightmares; The Underground; Toon Terrortory	Ghost Town; The Gauntlet	Cyber Insanity; Day of the Dead Procession; Dead Monsters of Rock - LIVE! Dr. Cleaver for President; Laser Monster Madness; The Deadly Dating Game; The Hanging '96: Hooray for Hollywood?	
25	1997	Bigfoot's Revenge; Camp Gonnagetcha; Curse of the Werewolf; Dominion of the Dead; Ghost Town Dead and Breakfast; Nightmares; The Inquisition; The Underground; The Underworld Unearthed; Toon Terrortory; XXV (25) Years of Fears	Ghost Town; The Gauntlet	Cyber Insanity III; Day of the Dead Procession; Ed Alonzo's Magic & Mayhem; Elvira's Dead Legends of Rock - LIVE! Laser Monster Madness; The Deadly Dating Game; The Hanging '97	
26	1998	Alien Attack; Bigfoot's Revenge; Camp Gonnagetcha; Deadman's Wharf; Dominion of the Dead; Horrorwood Hotel; Nightmares: The Awakening; The Inquisition; The Underground; The Underworld Unearthed	Ghost Town; The Gauntlet	Day of the Dead Procession; Ed Alonzo's Magic & Mayhem; Electric Nightmares; Elvira's Haunted House Party; The Hanging '98; The New Deadly Dating Game	
27	1999	Alien Attack; Bigfoot's Revenge; Camp Gonnagetcha; Deadman's Wharf; Dominion of the Dead; Elvira's Nightmare; Horrorwood Hotel; Tales from the Inquisition; The Underground; The Underworld Unearthed	Ghost Town; The Gauntlet	Day of the Dead Procession; Ed Alonzo's Magic & Mayhem; Electric Nightmares; Elvira's Ghost Stories Spooktacular; Tony Angelo, The Haunted Hypnotist; The Hanging '99: Starring the Crypt Keeper	
28	2000	Alien Attack; Army of the Underworld; Camp Gonnagetcha; Carnival of Carnivorous Clowns; Deadman's Wharf; Elvira's Nightmares; Gothic Graveyard; Horrorwood Hotel; The Crypt Keeper's Tales from the Inquisition; The Underground; Voodoo Witch Project	Backwoods; CarnEVIL; Ghost Town; The Gauntlet; The Swamp	Day of the Dead Native American Procession; Ed Alonzo's Magic and Mayhem; Elvira's Shock N' Rock Revue; Festival of Freaks Theatre; The Hanging: Starring the Crypt Keeper; Tony Angelo: Haunted Hypnotist	
29	2001	Alien Attack; Army of the Underworld; Blood Bayou; Carnival of Carnivorous Clowns; Curse of the Spiderwoods; Elvira's Red Moon Massacre; Lore of the Vampire; Malice in Wunderland; The Cryptkeeper's Horrorwood Fright FestEvil; The Underground	CarnEVIL; Ghost Town; The Gauntlet; The Swamp	Ed Alonzo's Magic and Mayhem; Festival of Freaks Theatre; Elvira at 20, Almost Legal; Dr. Cleaver Returns; The Hanging: Starring the Crypt Keeper; Tony Angelo: Haunted Hypnotist	
30	2002	Alien Attack; Army of the Underworld; Blood Bayou; Curse of the Spider; Fright Festival; Carnival of Carnivorous Clowns; Malice in Wunderland; The Underground; The Inquisition; Lore of the Vampire; Red Moon Massacre	CarnEVIL; Ghost Town; The Gauntlet; The Swamp	Beyond Bizarre; Ed Alonzo's Ghouls Gone Wild; Dr. Cleaver Returns; Putz's Prank Party; The Hanging; Zamora's Side Show of the Bizarre	
31	2003	Army of the Underworld; Asylum; Blood Bayou; Carnival of Carnivorous Clowns; Curse of the Spider; Hatchet High; Lore of the Vampire; Malice in Wunderland; Red Moon Massacre; Temple of Sacrifice; The Inquisition; Underground	CarnEVIL; Ghost Town; The Swamp	Beyond Bizarre; Ed Alonzo's Ghouls Gone Wild II; Dr. Cleaver On the Move; Michael Mezmer: Haunted Hypnotist; Putz's Prank Party; The Hanging; Zamora's Side Show of the Bizarre	
32	2004	Army of the Underworld; The Asylum: Revisited; Blood Bayou; Carnival of Carnivorous Clowns in 3-D; Curse of the Spider; Hatchet High; Lore of the Vampire; Malice in Wunderland; Red Beard's Revenge; Red Moon Massacre; Temple of Sacrifice; Terror Vision in 3-D	Ghost Town; The Swamp; The Gauntlet	Dr. Cleaver's Psycho Circus; Ed Alonzo's Magic and Mayhem; Festival of Freaks; Haunted Hypnotist; The Hanging; Tommy Tomb in the Terror Tiki Lounge	
33	2005	13 Axe Murder Manor; Asylum; Carnival of Carnivorous Clowns; Cavern of Lost Souls; Curse of the Spider; Feary Tales; Hatchet High; Lore of the Vampire; Red Beard's Revenge; Red Moon Massacre; Temple of Sacrifice; Terror Vision in 3-D	CarnEVIL; Ghost Town; Silver Bullet Mining Town; The Dark Realm; The Gauntlet	Dr. Cleaver's Psycho Circus; Ed Alonzo's Magic and Mayhem; Zamora's Festival of Freaks; Haunted Hypnotist; The Hanging; Tommy Tomb Comedy in the Terror Tiki Lounge	
34	2006	13 Axe Murder Manor; Asylum; Cavern of Lost Souls; Dark Realm with Lazer Rage; Feary Tales in 3-D; Hatchet High; Lore of the Vampire; Lost Vegas in 3-D; Red Beard's Revenge; Red Moon Massacre; Terror Vision in 3-D; The Grudge 2	CarnEVIL; Ghost Town; Silver Bullet Mining Town; The Gauntlet	Dead Idol; Festival of Freaks; Hacks; Haunted Hypnochick; Putz Prank Party; The Hanging	
35	2007	13 Axe Murder Manor; Beowulf: Labyrinth into Darkness; Black Widow's Cavern; Dark Realm Lazer Tag; Feary Tales; Killer Clown Kollege; Lore of the Vampire; Lost Vegas; Pyromaniax; Red Beard's Revenge; The Asylum; The Doll Factory; The Grudge 2	CarnEVIL; Ghost Town; Silver Bullet Mine Town; The Gauntlet	Death of Dr. Cleaver; Hacks: Trick or Treat; Inferno; The Chipper Lowell Experience; Death of Dr. Cleaver; The Hanging: It's a Mad, Mad, Mad Max World; The Rocketz; Zamora's Festival of Freaks	
36	2008	13 Axe Murder Manor; Alien Annihilation; Black Widow's Cavern; Club Blood; Corn Stalkers; Killer Clown Kollege; Labyrinth; Lost Vegas; Pyromaniax; Quarantine; The Asylum; The Doll Factory; The Slaughterhouse	CarnEVIL; Ghost Town; The Gauntlet	Dr. Cleaver's Big Election; Fangs: A Vampire Show; Festival of Freaks; Inferno; The Chipper Lowell Experience; The Hanging; The Hypnochick	
37	2009	Alien Annihilation; Black Widow's Cavern; Cornstalkers; Club Blood; Dia De Los Muertos; Labyrinth; Lockdown: The Asylum; Pyromaniax; Quarantine; Terror of London; The Doll Factory; The Slaughterhouse; Uncle Bobo's Big Top of the Bizarre; The Stepfather Scare Scene	CarnEVIL; Ghost Town; The Gauntlet	Bloodlust; Festival of Freaks; Inferno; The Chipper Lowell Experience; The Hanging	
38	2010	Black Widow's Cavern; Club Blood; Cornstalkers; Dia De Los Muertos in 3-D; Fallout Shelter; Labyrinth; Slaughterhouse; Lockdown: The Asylum; Sleepy Hollow Mountain; Terror of London; The Doll Factory; Uncle Bobo's Big Top of the Bizarre in 3-D; Virus Z	CarnEVIL; Ghost Town; Necropolis: City of the Dead	Blood Drums; De' Anna Nunez: The Hypno-Chick; Ed Alonzo's Psycho Circus of Magic and Mayhem; HACKS!: Die, Die, Die! Inferno; The Hanging; Zamora's Sideshow of Horrors	
39	2011	Cornstalkers; Delirium; Dia De Los Muertos in 3-D; Endgames: Warriors of the Apocalypse; Fallout Shelter; Invasion Beneath; Lockdown: The Asylum; Sleepy Hollow Mountain; Terror of London; The Doll Factory; The Slaughterhouse; Uncle Bobo's Big Top of the Bizarre in 3-D; Virus Z	CarnEVIL; Ghost Town; Gypsy Camp; Necropolis: City of the Dead	Blood Drums; Cursed; Ed Alonzo's Psycho Circus of Magic and Mayhem; Putz's Prank Party; The Hanging: Calico & Aliens; Wonders of Technology; Zamora's Side Show of The Bizarre	
40	2012	Delirium; Dia De Los Muertos; Dominion of the Dead; Endgames: Warriors of the Apocalypse; Fallout Shelter; Pinocchio Unstrung; Slaughterhouse; Terror of London; The Evil Dead; Trapped; Trick or Treat; Uncle Bobo's Big Top of the Bizarre; Virus Z	CarnEvil; Ghost Town; Gypsy Camp; Necropolis	Blood Drums; Cursed; Ed Alonzo's Funhouse; Elvira Visits the Haunt Museum (Autographs); Mephisto's Mechanical Mayhem; The Hanging Games; The Witching Hour; Tonga Tiki Terror; Unearthed; Zamora's Sideshow of Torture	
41	2013	Delirium; Black Magic; Dominion of the Damned; Endgames: Warriors of the Apocalypse; Forevermore; Mirror Mirror; Pinocchio Unstrung; The Gunslinger's Grave; Trick or Treat; Uncle Willy's Slaughterhouse; The Witch's Keep; Trapped: The New Experiment	Ghost Town; Necropolis; Gypsy Camp; Fiesta de los Muertos; CarnEvil	The Hanging: It Stinks; Blood Drums; Carny Trash; Cursed; Elvira's Sinema Seance; Possessed	
42	2014	Voodoo; The Tooth Fairy; Dominion of the Damned; Black Magic; Forevermore; Pinocchio Unstrung; The Gunslinger's Grave; Trick or Treat; The Witch's Keep; Trapped: Lock and Key; Special Ops: Infected	Ghost Town; Gypsy Camp: The Cursed Caravan; CarnEvil; Fiesta de los Muertos	The Hanging: Everything is Gruesome; Elvira's Big Top	
43	2015	Voodoo: Order of the Serpent; The Tooth Fairy; Paranormal Inc. Black Magic; Forevermore; Pinocchio Unstrung; The Gunslinger's Grave: A Blood Moon Rises; Trick or Treat; My Bloody Clementine; The Dead of Winter; Special Ops: Infected - Patient Zero	Ghost Town; CarnEvil; Fiesta de los Muertos	The Hanging: Straight Outta Calico; Elvira's Asylum	
44	2016	Voodoo: Order of the Serpent; The Tooth Fairy; Paranormal Inc; The Gunslinger's Grave: A Blood Moon Rises; Trick or Treat; The Dead of Winter: Revenge of the Wendigo; The Red Barn; Shadow Lands; Black Ops: Infected; Skeleton Key Rooms: Prey, Slasher, Visions, Zozo	Ghost Town; CarnEvil; Fiesta de los Muertos; The Hollow	The Hanging: Finding Gory; Elvira's Danse Macabre	
45	2017	Voodoo: Order of the Serpent; The Tooth Fairy; Paranormal Inc. Dark Ride; Pumpkin Eater; Trick or Treat: Lights Out; The Red Barn; Shadow Lands; Special Ops: Infected; Halloween Hootenanny	Ghost Town; CarnEvil; Fiesta de los Muertos; The Hollow	The Hanging: Fake Noose; Elvira, Mistress of the Dark	
46	2018	Special Ops: Infected; Shadow Lands; Paranormal Inc. Trick or Treat: Lights Out; Pumpkin Eater; The Red Barn; Dark Ride; The Depths; Dark Entities; Halloween Hootenanny	Ghost Town; CarnEvil; The Hollow; Forsaken Lake	Awaken the Dead; Conjure; Hacks! Cutting Room Floor; The Hanging: Shhh... It Happens	
47	2019	Dark Entities; Dark Ride; Halloween Hootenanny; Origins: The Curse of Calico; Paranormal Inc. Pumpkin Eater; Shadow Lands; Special Ops: Infected; The Depths; Wax Works	CarnEVIL; Forsaken Lake; Ghost Town; The Hollow	Awaken the Dead; Conjurers; The Hanging: Witches' Revenge; Puppet Up! Uncensored	
	2020	Canceled in response to the COVID-19 pandemic			
48	2021	Dark Entities; Dark Ride: Castle of Chaos; Halloween Hootenanny; Mesmer: Sideshow of the Mind; Origins: The Curse of Calico; Paranormal Inc. - Case #13 - The Haunting of Hayden Hill; Pumpkin Eater; The Depths; Wax Works	CarnEVIL; Forsaken Lake; Ghost Town; Gore-ing 20s The Hollow	Le Magnifique Carnaval du Grotesque; Doce de La Noche; Into The Fog; Invitation to Terror; Puppet Up! Uncensored; Wicked Drums; Conjurers - Magic and Mirth at the Birdcage Theatre	
49	2022	Bloodline 1842; Dark Entities; Dark Ride; Mesmer: Sideshow of the Mind; Origins: The Curse of Calico; Pumpkin Eater; The Depths; The Grimoire; Wax Works	The Hollow; Gore-ing 20s Forsaken Lake; CarnEVIL; Ghost Town Streets	Le Magnifique Carnaval du Grotesque; Conjurers: Dark Magic; Puppet Up! Uncensored	
50	2023	Bloodline 1842; Cinema Slasher; Dark Entities; Mesmer: Sideshow of the Mind; Origins: The Curse of Calico; Room 13; The Chilling Chambers; The Depths; The Grimoire; Wax Works	Gore-ing 20s Forsaken Lake; CarnEVIL; Ghost Town Streets; The Gauntlet	Le Magnifique Carnaval du Grotesque; Dr. Cleaver Returns; Music, Monsters, and Mayhem; The Hanging: Uncancelled	
51	2024	Bloodline 1842; Cinema Slasher; Eight Fingers Nine: The Boogeyman; Mesmer: Sideshow of the Mind; Origins: The Curse of Calico; Room 13; The Chilling Chambers; The Grimoire; Wax Works; Widows	Gore-ing 20s Forsaken Lake; CarnEVIL; Ghost Town Streets; The Gauntlet	Conjurers; Le Magnifique Carnaval du Grotesque; The Hanging: The Errors Tour; Yours Cruelly, Elvira XXperience	
52	2025	Cinema Slasher; Eight Fingers Nine: The Boogeyman; Mary: The Haunting of Worth Home; Mesmer: Sideshow of the Mind; Origins: The Curse of Calico; Room 13; The Chilling Chambers; The Grimoire; The Zoo; Widows	Gore-ing 20s Forsaken Lake; CarnEVIL; Ghost Town Streets; The Gauntlet	Conjurers; Le Magnifique Carnaval du Grotesque; The Hanging: There's a New Tariff in Town	
53	2026	Cinema Slasher; Eight Fingers Nine: The Boogeyman; Inked; Mary: The Haunting of Worth Home; Origins: The Curse of Calico; Room 13; The Chilling Chambers; The Zoo; Unearthed; Widows	Gore-ing 20s Forsaken Lake; CarnEVIL (reimagined, emphasizing more of a circus theme, led by Professor Mesmer); Ghost Town Streets; The Gauntlet	Occultum - Curated by the Magic Castle; The Hanging: Noose Maxxxing; Voodoo: Bayou's Edge	

== History ==
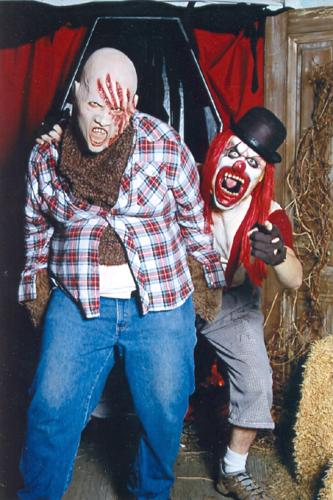
Two street monsters posing by the Ghost Town Coffin.

The concept was introduced to the park's operations committee in a meeting in September 1973 by George Condos and Martha Boyd of the marketing department, and Bill Hollingshead and Gary Salisbury of the entertainment office. Bud Hurlbut, who built and operated (as a concessionaire) the Calico Mine Ride, the Timber Mountain Log Ride and other rides, decided that having static props was not enough, so he put on a gorilla suit and scared guests as they rode on the Mine Ride. Originally a three-night affair, running October 26–28, 1973, Halloween Haunt was an instant hit, and by the next year, the event sold out nightly. Knott's Berry Farm was originally modeled after Calico, California, a ghost town that was a result of the California silver rush. Already having a dedicated Ghost Town section in the theme park, this area would become the designed area for the original Halloween Haunt, eventually expanding to the entire park.

The 1980s would continue to be a success for the theme park, and popular culture icons were employed to represent the event. In 1981, actor and singer "Weird Al" Yankovic joined the cast, as did Cassandra "Elvira" Peterson in the following year. Elvira was prominently featured in many Halloween Haunt events until 2001. According to postings on her Myspace page, Cassandra was released from her contract by the park's new owners due to their wanting a more family friendly appeal. The 1990s would show a different approach to Halloween. Humor was added to many facets in the theme park and Knott's turned from the explicit horror to black comedy. This continuing balance of horror and humor has been a key to the continuing success of Knott's Halloween Haunt.

On August 4, 2020, Knott's announced that the 48th Scary Farm season would be cancelled in response to the ongoing COVID-19 pandemic which caused the closure of theme parks in California in March at the request of California Governor Gavin Newsom and was deferred to 2021. The theme park was not open at the time of the announcement.

By the time the annual, six-week-long event celebrated its 50th year in 2023, it had become the largest event of any theme park.

On November 2, 2023, Cedar Fair announced plans to merge with Six Flags, forming a new company and retaining the Six Flags name. Described as a "merger of equals", former Cedar Fair management will remain in control of the new company, which will be headquartered in Charlotte, North Carolina. On July 1, 2024, the merger was successfully completed.

== Park transformation ==
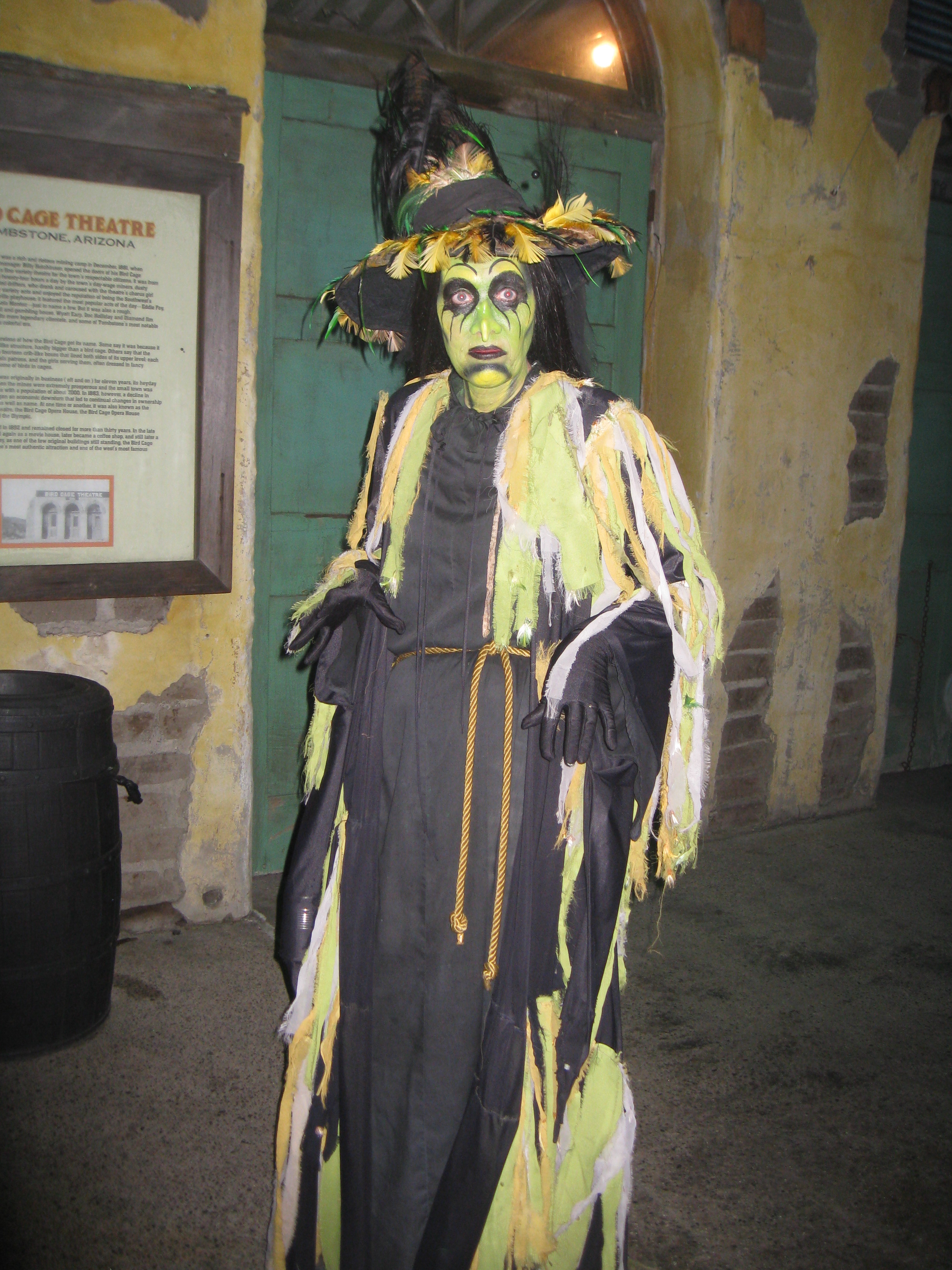
Charlene Parker as the Green Witch.

While Knott's Berry Farm is a year-round theme park, the entire acreage is modified to fit the Halloween motif. Rides and other attractions are converted into macabre themes. Seasonal workers are cast as a variety of monsters, roaming the 160-acre (0.65 km^{2}) park in terrifying scare zones, amidst haze produced by giant fog machines.

The controversial "Hanging" live show was a staple of the Haunt that lampoons celebrities and people in the news through a series of staged hangings. The Hanging had been an annual event since the 1979 Halloween Haunt, but went on a brief hiatus after the 2019 season until it returned in 2023 relocated from the Calico Mine Stage where it took place from 2016 to 2019 (previously performed in Calico Square next to the saloon until the Calico Mine Stage was built) to the Wagon Camp Theater located across from the park gates. As of 2023, the park has 10 mazes, 5 scare zones, and 4 live shows.

=== The Wicked Green Witch Of Calico ===
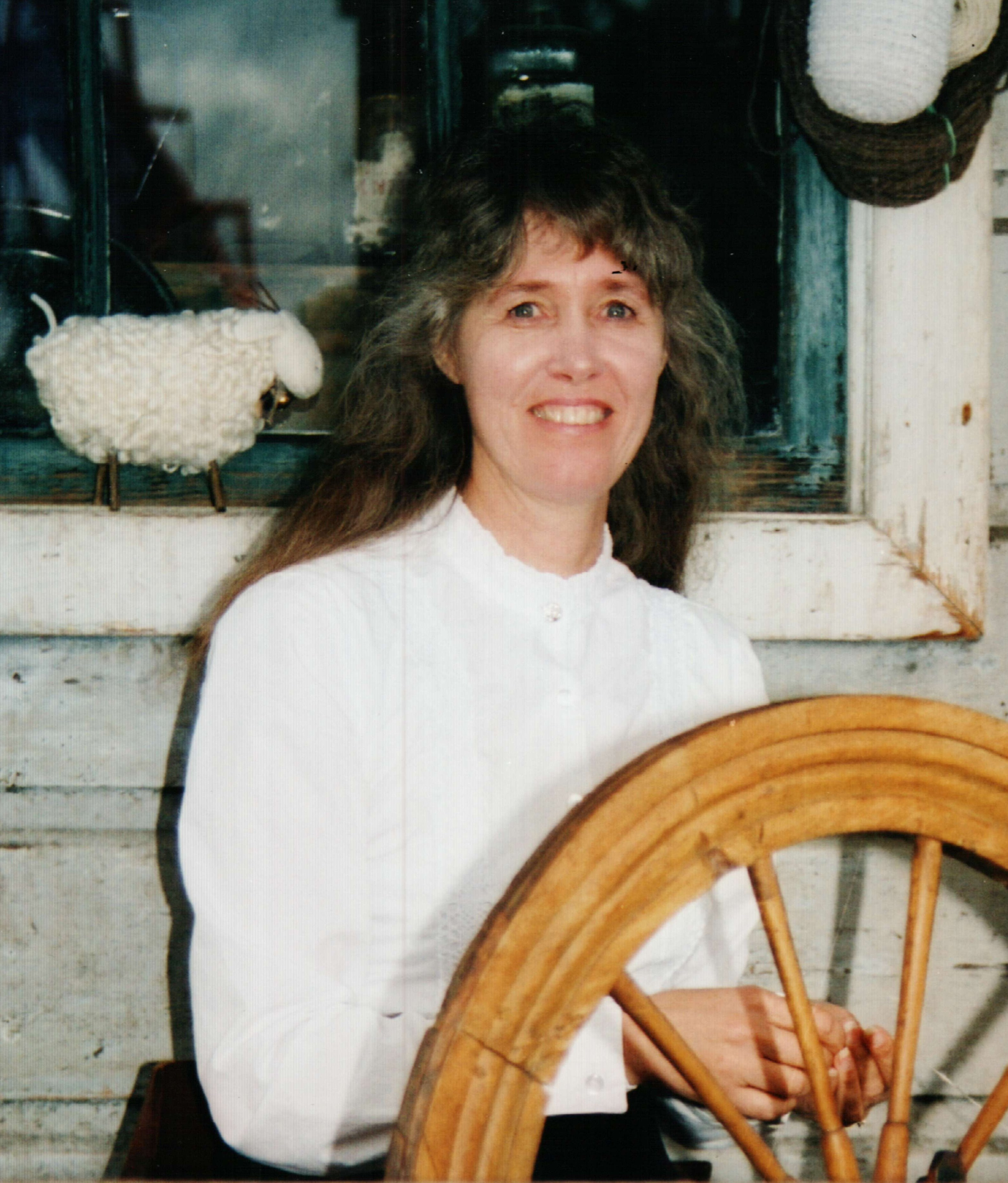
Charlene Parker no longer portrays Sarah Morgan-Marshall but continues to serve as a spinner and shift lead in Ghost Town at Knott's.

Some characters have developed a special appeal, such as the legendary, iconic, and infamous villainess herself Sarah Rebecca Anne "The Wicked Green Witch Of Calico" Morgan-Marshall.

Back in 1973, Diana Kirchen-Kelly was chosen to don the role of the first Green Witch under the name of Spooky Sarah when Haunt began. After Diana left the Haunt in 1976, the Green Witch role was passed to Barbara "Barb" Best-Becka, then to Karen Aikman, and then to Charlene Parker in 1982.

The Wicked Green Witch Of Calico became the most famous of the 1,000 "monsters" at Knott's Scary Farm, and Charlene Parker served in that role for over three decades (1983-2017). Tall and thin, she had a reputation for "gliding" rather than walking, and was continually able to catch guests by surprise. Some would fall over backwards onto the ground, and leave a wet spot on the pavement where they fell. This ability gave her "serious street cred" among her fellow "monsters." Sweepers at Knott's would just sit and wait near her, knowing that it would not be long before she would scare a group of guests so much that they would toss their food up into the air. In the age before cell phones, Knott's Guest Relations referred to her as "the Number 1 cause of separated parties." People would come to the Guest Relations office because their group had scattered after being "scared by a green witch." Parker was the subject of two feature articles about her in the Orange County Register, as well as the travel blog of the Los Angeles Times, and other publications, as well as appearing in Knott's commercials.

In September 2021, Sarah was replaced by The Conductor as the new face of Knott's Scary Farm.

== Awards ==
Knott's Scary Farm has won Amusement Today's Golden Ticket Award for Best Halloween Event twice, in 2005 and 2007.

== See also ==
- Howl-O-Scream, a Halloween event by United Parks & Resorts (Busch Gardens, SeaWorld)
- Los Angeles Haunted Hayride, a Halloween event in Griffith Park
- Queen Mary's Dark Harbor, a Halloween event at the RMS Queen Mary
- Six Flags Fright Fest, a Halloween event at Six Flags parks
- Universal's Halloween Horror Nights, a Halloween event at Universal Destinations & Experiences parks
