= Lvcrft =

American Halloween music group

- Origin: Los Angeles
- Genres: Halloween Music, Pop
- Years active: 2019-Present
- Label: Spooky Never Sleeps
- Spinoffs: Nightmare Soundworks, NightWorks
- Members: Evan Bogart, Amanda "MNDR" Warner, Peter Wade Keusch
- Website: lvcrft.net

Lvcrft, stylized in all caps as LVCRFT, (pronounced Lovecraft). is a Halloween music collective formed in Los Angeles in 2019 by Evan Kidd Bogart, Amanda MNDR Warner and Peter Wade Keusch. The group produces an annual Halloween album and also, under the name Nightmare Soundworks, provides soundtracks, media and DJs for haunted attractions including The Queen Mary's Dark Harbor in Long Beach California.

== In Popular Culture ==
LVCRFT's music has been featured in Hocus Pocus 2, Hubie Halloween, Chilling Adventures of Sabrina (TV series), Flack and Chucky as well as being performed on Dancing With The Stars. It also makes a yearly appearance on the soundtrack played in all Spirit Halloween stores across America, the band even filmed a music video for "Every Night" inside a Spirit Halloween location in Southern California. The band took over SiriusXM's Volume with Lyndsey Parker and Davey Havok of AFI in October 2022 providing guests and music

== Featured Performers ==
=== Horror Cinema ===
LVCRFT's albums often feature cultural icons and legends of horror cinema. Their 8th album Skeleton Sam's Deadtime Stories is structured like a late night radio broadcast and features Robert Englund, Heather Langenkamp, Bruce Campbell, Roger L. Jackson, Jasmin Savoy Brown, Alyssa Sutherland, John Kassir, Ernie Hudson, Katharine Isabelle, Mick Garris, Robert Rodriguez, David Dastmalchian, Michael-Leon Wooley, Jenna Davis, Christopher Young, Cynthia Garris, and Cindy Weintraub.

=== Music and Culture ===
Albums also feature musical collaborators including songwriters, artist and producers. Johnny Plague, ZZ Ward, Bonnie McKee, G Koop, Sarah Hudson, J Hart, Monte Revolta, TJ from Deathchant, Uffie, Har Mar Superstar, Morgan McMichaels, Saint from Dragula, Laganja Estranja. Remixers have included RAC & MNDR.

== Discography ==
=== Studio albums ===
- This is Halloween Vol 1. (2019, Spooky Never Sleeps)
- The Sequel (2020, Spooky Never Sleeps)
- The Return (2021, Spooky Never Sleeps)
- Scream Warriors w/ Christopher Young (2022, Spooky Never Sleeps)
- V (2023, Spooky Never Sleeps)
- Under The Covers (2024, Spooky Never Sleeps)
- Halloween Kids (2025, Spooky Never Sleeps)
- Skeleton Sam's Deadtime Stories (2026, Spooky Never Sleeps)

=== EPs ===
- Dia De Los Muertos EP (2020, Spooky Never Sleeps)
- Dia De Los Muertos Dos EP (2021, Spooky Never Sleeps)
- Deadly Valentine EP (2022, Spooky Never Sleeps)
- Halfway There: The Half-O-Ween EP (2022, Spooky Never Sleeps)
- Drip EP (2023, Spooky Never Sleeps)
- Spooky Campfire Ghost Songs Vol 1 EP (2022, Spooky Never Sleeps)

== Nightmare Soundworks ==
In 2025 the band spun off a separate entity, Nightmare Soundworks, to handle soundscape and maze audio for haunted attractions. Nightmare Soundworks has scored mazes, opening ceremonies, slider shows and walk throughs across Southern California and Colorado including The Queen Mary's Dark Harbor, LA Haunted Hayride and Magic of the Jack O'Lanterns.
