= FrightFest =

Fright Fest or FrightFest may refer to:

- Six Flags Fright Fest, a Halloween event at Six Flags parks
- FrightFest (film festival), a British film festival, also known as Film4 Fright Fest
- "FrightFest", a Halloween event at the Elitch Gardens Theme Park
- Fangoria FrightFest, a defunct online film festival sponsored by Fangoria magazine
- Shaefer's FrightFest, a haunted attraction in Flemington, New Jersey
