= Los Angeles Haunted Hayride =

Yearly haunted attraction in Griffith Park

Griffith Park
- Opening date: 2009

Ride statistics
- Attraction type: Annual Halloween event
- Theme: Haunted attraction
- Website: losangeleshauntedhayride.com

The Los Angeles Haunted Hayride is a yearly Halloween haunted hayride in Los Angeles, California, located near the city's Old Zoo in Griffith Park. It was created by Ten Thirty One Productions, subsequently receiving a record Shark Tank investment from Mark Cuban, and bought out by haunted attraction company Thirteenth Floor Entertainment Group.

Opened in Calabasas, California in 2009, the Hayride has long been held in Griffith Park and features not only the hayride itself, but both original mazes and those based on horror intellectual property. During the COVID-19 pandemic, the Hayride was reinvented as a drive-in theater attraction in San Dimas, California with wandering performers, before returning to Griffith Park in 2021. In recent years, the attraction has been set at a 1980s Halloween festival in the fictional town of Midnight Falls, which Time Out compared to Sons of Anarchy and Twin Peaks.

== See also ==
- Howl-O-Scream, a Halloween event by United Parks & Resorts (Busch Gardens, SeaWorld)
- Knott's Scary Farm, a Halloween event at Knott's Berry Farm
- Queen Mary's Dark Harbor, a Halloween event at the RMS Queen Mary
- Six Flags Fright Fest, a Halloween event at Six Flags parks
- Universal's Halloween Horror Nights, a Halloween event at Universal Destinations & Experiences parks
