= Circus of the Scars =

Circus of the Scars, a pun on the title of the television show Circus of the Stars, may refer to:

- Circus of the Scars, a book by sideshow performers Tim Cridland AKA Zamora the Torture King and Jan Gregor
