= Halloween Spooktacular =

Annual Halloween event at SeaWorld parks

SeaWorld Orlando
- Coordinates: 28°24′39″N 81°27′45″W
- Status: Operating
- Opening date: 2008; 18 years ago

SeaWorld San Antonio
- Coordinates: 29.4584°N 98.6998°W
- Status: Operating
- Opening date: 2008; 18 years ago

SeaWorld San Diego
- Coordinates: 32°45′57″N 117°13′38″W
- Status: Operating
- Opening date: 2008; 18 years ago

Halloween Spooktacular is an annual Halloween event that takes place at SeaWorld Orlando, SeaWorld San Antonio, and SeaWorld San Diego. The event debuted in 2008 at all three parks. It was suspended for several years at the San Antonio park, but was reintroduced in 2016. The event is intended for children and includes trick-or-treating for all guests.

Halloween Spooktacular features attractions such as Halloween-themed Sesame Street live shows from costumed performers, trick-or-treating, party zones, face painting, and hayrides.

== See also ==
- Howl-O-Scream, the adult Halloween event held at SeaWorld parks
- Haunted attraction (simulated)
