= Melissa Carbone =

American entrepreneur

- Born: 1976 (age 49–50)
- Known for: Horror-themed attractions

Melissa Carbone is an American entrepreneur who creates, owns, and produces live attractions primarily in the horror genre. She is the creator and founder of Ten Thirty One Productions which owns Haunted Hayrides in Los Angeles and New York and the Great Horror Campout.

== Early life ==
Carbone grew up in Connecticut. In 1999, she started working for Clear Channel Los Angeles, where she organized events across multiple corporate platforms. She was their youngest General Sales Manager.

== Career ==
Each Halloween, Carbone would decorate her Westwood home with elaborate animatronics and giant snow globes. She later described herself as an unwitting home-haunter. After seeing hundreds of people admire her decorations, Carbone realized it was a business opportunity. The idea for a Halloween haunted hayride came from the traditional hayrides she remembered growing up in New England. She quit her job in 2009 and, invested her life savings into the company Ten Thirty One Productions. Carbone raised half a million dollars from friends and family, along with her first sponsor, Mini Cooper.

Carbone pitched her company in Season 5 (2013) of Shark Tank. She landed what was the biggest investment in the history of the show when billionaire Mark Cuban paid $2 million for a 20% stake in her company. The Young Entrepreneur Council called her pitch one of their "7 Favorite Shark Tank" pitches in the history of the show.

Carbone is one of the few female business owners in the horror entertainment industry, with a team that is almost entirely female.

Carbone sold Ten Thirty One Productions to Thirteenth Floor Entertainment Group in 2018 and is currently an owner and producer at the parent company which is the largest Halloween Themed Entertainment company in the world.

In 2018, Carbone established the music festival, Tailgate Fest, in Los Angeles. It took place at The Forum before growing into a two-day festival that included camping, tailgating, and a large pool party next to the stage. It was the first festival in the United States that allowed tailgating to continue through the performances of the music line. It has hosted acts like Florida Georgia Line, Toby Keith, Nelly, Hardy, Brantley Gilbert, Brett Eldredge, Lee Brice, Jake Owen, Billy Currington, Chris Janson, Big Boi, Lindsay Ell, Blanco Brown, Clint Black, Nate Smith and others.

Carbone hosted a second Tailgate Fest in 2019, following the success of the first festival and brought it back for its third year in 2022 after being paused due to the pandemic. It was held an hour east of Los Angeles in 2019 and at the NASCAR Track in Fontana, CA in 2022. The festival has been broadcast on Country Music Television (CMT) and featured in Billboard, Rolling Stone, Pollstar, Extra, Guitar Girl Magazine, and others.

In addition to being featured in publications such as Forbes, Fortune, and Entrepreneur, Carbone has appeared on The Today Show as an industry expert and called a "market maker" by Bloomberg News. She was named 2016 Entertainment Visionary by CSQ Magazine and also a finalist for "Woman Of The Year" by Los Angeles Business Journal.
