= Queen Mary's Dark Harbor =

Haunted ship attraction in Long Beach, California

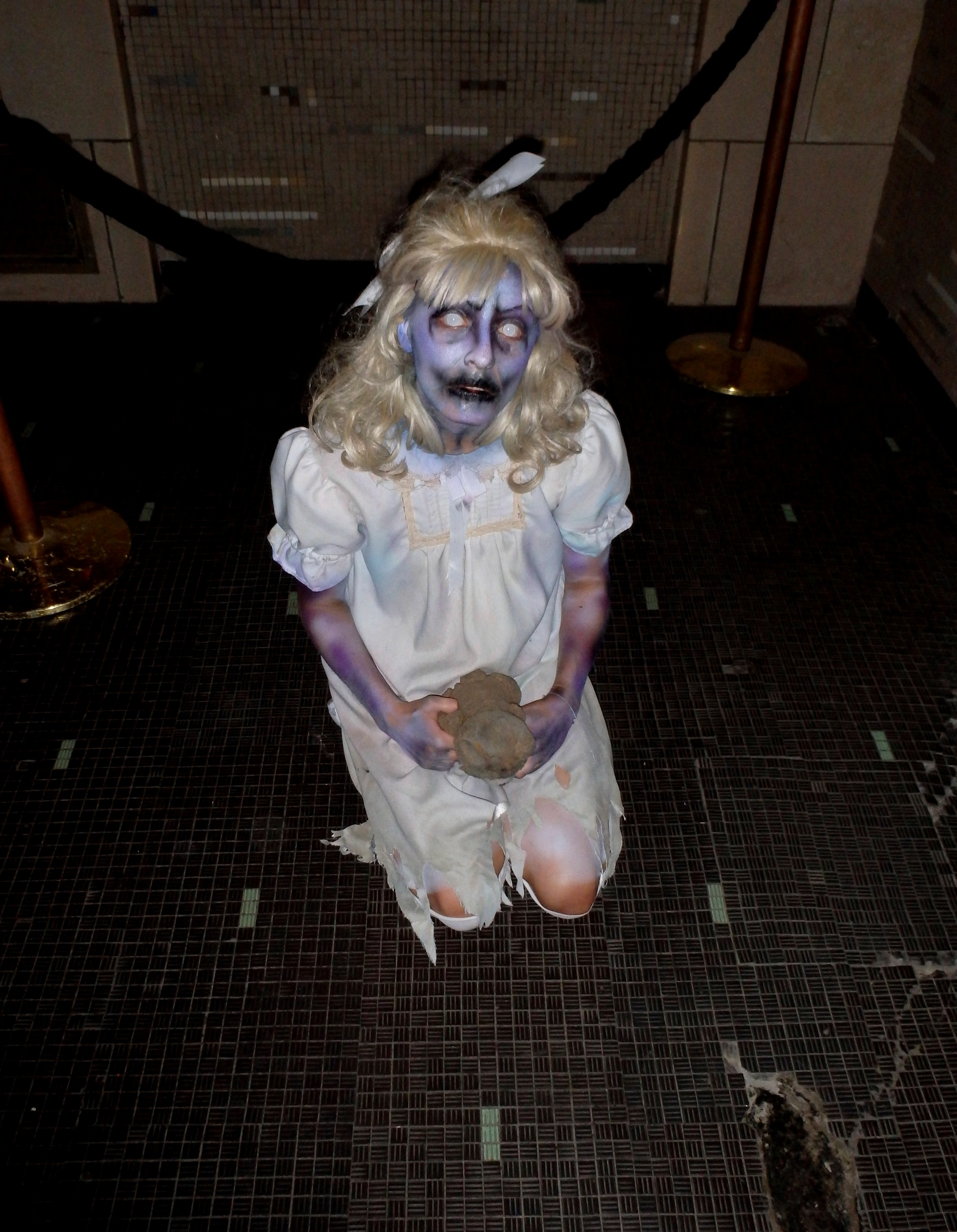
- "Scary Mary" at Queen Mary's Dark Harbor

RMS Queen Mary
- Opening date: October 1, 2010

Ride statistics
- Attraction type: Annual Halloween event
- Theme: Haunted attraction

Queen Mary's Dark Harbor is a yearly Halloween haunted attraction at the RMS Queen Mary in Long Beach, California. During the fall season, the Queen Mary and its parking lot are converted to comprise mazes, "slider" street performances, a virtual reality horror experience, and circus performances. The event is populated by a variety of scare performers, led by "icons" such as Scary Mary, the Captain, Half Hatch Henry, and the Ringmaster.

Queen Mary's Dark Harbor was predated by the annual Halloween event, entitled, "Shipwreck: Halloween Terror Fest." In 2019, a sister location was developed in Orlando, Florida by the Epic Entertainment group, entitled, "Dark Horizons: Point of No Return." This event included three walk-through mazes (Ghost Ship, Murder Island, Vodou), various performances (fire-eating, aerialists, local DJs), themed food and bars, and wandering scare actors.

Dark Harbor was developed by a team directed by David Wally, well known for directing projects such as the Westworld immersive activation at SXSW. The Queen Mary has a long history of ghost stories and supposed hauntings, which served as the attraction's inspiration. The supposedly haunted Room B340, as one example, inspired a Dark Harbor maze. Prioritizing greater audience immersion year over year, the team added alternate paths, hidden passages, and secret bars.

Dark Harbor ceased to exist following the COVID-19 pandemic, being temporarily replaced by Shaquille O'Neal's SHAQtoberfest. Dark Harbor reopened on September 20, 2024, under new management by the Thirteenth Floor Entertainment Group. The sister location of Dark Horizons was also cancelled in 2020, ending its one-year run.

== Current Mazes ==
Initial Year	Maze	Mascot	Location	Notes
2024	Breakout: Maximum Security	Samuel the Savage	Land (South Side)	
2016	Big Top Terror	The Ringmaster	Land (West Side)	
2017	Feast: The Final Cut	The Butcher	Ship (Stern)	
2024	Infirmary	Dr. Edwin Masters, Graceful Gale	Ship (Port Beam)	
2015	Lullaby	Scary Mary	Ship (Port Bow)	
2014	Voodoo: The Queen's Curse	The Voodoo Priestess	Unknown	

== Attraction History ==
Queen Mary's Dark Harbor Attraction History
#	Year	Mazes	Shows	Experiences	Notes
1	2010	The Cage; Containment; Hellfire; Submerged; Village of the Damned	Stage Show	The Barricades; Hell's Bell Tower	
2	2011	The Cage; Containment; Hellfire; Submerged; The Village	Various Performances	The Barricades; Hell's Bell Tower	
3	2012	The Cage; Containment; Deadrise; Submerged; The Village of the Damned	Various Performances	Hell's Bell Tower	
4	2013	Circus; Containment; Deadrise; Hellfire; Submerged; Village of the Damned	Freak Show	Carnival Rides	
5	2014	B340; Circus; Deadrise; Soulmate; Submerged; Voodoo Village	Monster Midway, Freak Show, Sliders, Drag Show, DJs, etc.)	The Encounters Experience; Carnival Rides	
6	2015	B340; Circus; Deadrise; Lullaby; Soulmate; Voodoo Village	Sideshow: Freaks & Oddities	The Curse of Anubis: Paintball Adventure	
7	2016	B340; Circus Big Top Terror; Deadrise; Intrepid; Lullaby; Soulmate	Panic: A 4-D Experience; Sideshow	Carnival Rides; Hex (Paintball); Various Performers (Violinists, Dancers, etc.)	
8	2017	B340; Circus Big Top Terror; Deadrise; Feast; Intrepid; Lullaby; Soulmate	4-D Theater; Carnival Rides; Various Performers	Various Bars ("The Meat Locker" Ice Bar, Big Top Experience Bar, Butcher's Bar, Secret Side Bar)	
9	2018	B340; Circus; Deadrise; Feast; Intrepid; Lullaby	Monster Dance Party; Panic: A 4-D Experience; Various Performers (Sliders, Aerial Ring, Pyre Fire Breathers, etc.)	Carnival Rides; Various Bars	
10	2019	B340; Circus; Feast; Intrepid; Lullaby; Rogue	Various Performers (Sliders, Fire Breathers, Aerialists, DJs, etc.)	Carnival Rides; Panic: A 4-D Experience; Secret Bars (The Sidebar, Overboard, The Broken Compass, and The Line Up)	
	2020	Canceled in response to the COVID-19 pandemic			
	2021	Did not return			
	2022	Did not return			
	2023	Did not return			
11	2024	Big Top Terror; Breakout and on the Run!; Feast; Infirmary; Lullaby	Lady Mabel Presents: The Summoning of Samuel; Maiden Voyage Launch Party; Final Voyage; Various Performers (Dark Harbor Sliders, Fire Spinners, etc.)	Carnival Rides; Observation Deck; Secret Speakeasies; Spirits of Dark Harbor; Various Activities (Anchor Axe, Pirates Plunder Shootout, etc.)	
12	2025	Big Top Terror; Breakout: Maximum Security; Feast: The Final Cut; Infirmary; Lullaby; Voodoo: The Queen's Curse	Various Performers (Dark Harbor Sliders, Fire Spinners, etc.)	Carnival Rides; Secret Speakeasies	

== See also ==
- Howl-O-Scream, a Halloween event by United Parks & Resorts (Busch Gardens, SeaWorld)
- Knott's Scary Farm, a Halloween event at Knott's Berry Farm
- Los Angeles Haunted Hayride, a Halloween event in Griffith Park
- Six Flags Fright Fest, a Halloween event at Six Flags parks
- Universal's Halloween Horror Nights, a series of Halloween events by Universal Destinations & Experiences
