= Ten Thirty One Productions =

American entertainment company

Ten Thirty One Productions llc
- Type: Themed entertainment company
- Industry: Show business
- Founded: 2009
- Founders: Melissa Carbone; Alyson Richards
- Headquarters: Sherman Oaks, Los Angeles
- Area served: United States
- Key people: Melissa Carbone (CEO)
- Brands: Los Angeles Haunted Hayride; New York Haunted Hayride; The Great Horror Campout; The Ghost Ship

Ten Thirty One Productions was an American entertainment company based in Los Angeles that created, owned, and produced live attractions in the horror genre. It was featured on Season 5 of Shark Tank where it received the largest investment in the history of the show. The company was sold to Thirteenth Floor Entertainment Group.

== History ==
Ten Thirty One Productions was founded in 2009 by Melissa Carbone and Alyson Richards. The same year, they launched Los Angeles Haunted Hayride in Calabasas, California. The company generated $400,000 in revenue during its first year of business.

The company appeared in Season 5 (2013) of Shark Tank, where Carbone pitched the company to potential investors. Ten Thirty One Productions landed what was the biggest investment in the history of the show when billionaire Mark Cuban paid $2 million for a 20% stake. The company used the money to expand operations from California to a national audience, and Cuban helped secure ticket distribution contracts with Live Nation (its CEO became another investor in the company) and Ticketmaster. After the show, the company had to triple its cast and crew to nearly 1,000.

Ten Thirty One Productions brought in $3 million in revenue in 2014. The following year, the company created New York Haunted Hayride.

In 2018 an accident at a New York event caused injury to one patron, followed by a lengthy lawsuit that resulted in a not guilty verdict. Eventually, Ten Thirty One was purchased by Thirteenth Floor Entertainment Group, the world's largest haunted house company. Melissa Carbone, as well as Alyson Richards of Ten Thirty One, remained with the company.

== Live attractions ==
Los Angeles Haunted Hayride and New York Haunted Hayride are Halloween-themed attractions. They are held once a year, beginning in early October and running every weekend through the end of the month. To prepare the events, the company polled 30,000 people and asked them what they feared. The three most frequent answers were: darkness, claustrophobic spaces and clowns. As of 2015, the attractions employed about 250 actors.

To minimize its environmental footprint, Ten Thirty One Productions recycles and composts; features plastic-free concessions, hybrid and electric production vehicles, biodiesel fuels, 100-percent reused or recycled sets and wardrobes, and plant-based concessions; and offers carpool discounts.

=== Los Angeles Haunted Hayride ===
Los Angeles Haunted Hayride is held in Griffith Park Zoo in Los Angeles. Visitors are taken on traditional tractor drawn, hay filled wagons through a fantasy world of ghosts, demons and monsters. The attraction offers five different "scare zones" along with dining, retail and other activities. The site includes a 10,000 square-foot clown maze where even the attendees wear clown masks.

Ten Thirty One begins planning each year’s Hayride in January, writing scripts and designing scenes and props for each scene. Everything is first built in warehouses, and 10 days before opening, pieces are brought to the 30-acre site in trucks and reconstructed there. The event employs hundreds of actors and attracts an average of 15,000 guests each weekend.

In 2016, when the event carried the theme "Secret Society," attendees could leave their wagons for the first time in the event's history, to have a secret society initiation experience on foot. The "Trick or Treat" portion of the attraction tripled in size, with life-size suburban houses. Also, Universal Pictures took over the space in the newly named Ouija: Origin of Evil in the first such partnership for Haunted Hayride.

=== New York Haunted Hayride ===
New York Haunted Hayride is held in Randall’s Island Park, a spot that had been used for asylums and psychiatric hospitals. The attraction is a half-hour, 4,000-feet-long trip around a 12-acre section. As of 2015, it employed just over 100 actors. The experiences for Halloween 2016 included House of Shadows, Theater Macabre, and Purgatory Haunted Village.

=== The Great Horror Campout ===
The Great Horror Campout launched in 2013, when it spanned nine U.S. cities over 11 weekends. The campout is an overnight, 12-hour event. Participants are assigned tents and given tips for surviving the interactive camping experience. From there, campers can tailor their experience to their own comfort level, from a simple campfire night to "Hellhunt," a horror-themed scavenger hunt. Other interactive activities include simulated kidnapping and a game called "blood tag." The events are populated by 100 masked actors. The Campout travels along the West Coast every summer.

=== Other attractions ===
Ten Thirty One Productions opened a haunted boat attraction, The Ghost Ship, which had its maiden voyage in Orange County in 2011, and Great Movie Horror Night, a series of horror movie screening parties in Los Angeles.
