= The Blackout Experiments =

- Theatrical release poster
- Directed by: Rich Fox
- Produced by: Kris Curry
- Cinematography: Michael J. Pepin
- Edited by: Rich Fox
- Music by: James Clements
- Distributed by: Gravitas Ventures
- Release date: January 24, 2016 (Sundance Film Festival)
- Running time: 80 minutes
- Country: United States
- Language: English

The Blackout Experiments is a 2016 documentary that examines the immersive horror experience Blackout. The documentary is directed by Rich Fox and had its world premiere at the 2016 Sundance Film Festival. It was released by Gravitas Ventures in July 2016 on Video on Demand, Cable on demand, DVD and Blu-Ray, and Starz Network. The documentary received mixed reviews.

== Synopsis ==
The documentary looks at Blackout, an immersive horror experience in which participants willingly take part in a haunted house type event. The scares are tailored to their individual fears, which they relay to the event coordinators prior to fully entering the show. Acts performed on the participants will differ depending on the scares set up by the Blackout staff. Performers are allowed to touch participants, unlike most other fright attractions, and participants are given a safe word if they grow too uncomfortable or scared.

In the documentary, Fox interviews several of Blackout's repeat customers in order to understand why they continue to return to the event. He captures their reactions to various frights, and for some, the news that they have attended too many Blackout events and are asked not to return.

== Cast ==
- Kristjan Thor
- Russell Eaton
- Bob Glouberman
- Allison Fogarty
- Hannah Kaplan
- Omar Hanson
- Jacob Odenberg
- Stephen McCoy
- Jessica Sowa
- Gladys Santiago
- Natalia Zamparini
- Mike Fontaine
- Anthony Rogers

== Reception ==
Critical reception has been mostly negative. Film review aggregator Rotten Tomatoes reports that 45% of critics gave the film a positive review, based on 11 reviews with an average score of 4/10.

Variety gave The Blackout Experiments a favorable review, writing that it was "well assembled, particularly in the editorial department, and boasts an original score (commingled with the Blackout events’ own sound designs) whose creepy atmospherics and sonic jolts would work very well in a regular fictive horror film." The Verge also praised the movie, as they felt that "it’s the subjects of The Blackout Experiments that make the film so compelling, as they struggle with their attraction to the experience, the fear and paranoia it instills in them, and eventually, reach a strange kind of peace and decide to leave it behind." The Los Angeles Times also gave a positive review, stating it was "often chilling and hard to shake" and "should captivate horror fans."

The Hollywood Reporter was more critical, criticizing it for being "neither scary nor shocking". JoBlo.com was also critical, as they questioned the film's legitimacy and stated that "even if I’m wrong and somehow this is real, it’s still really boring."
