= Shocktoberfest =

Annual haunted event in Pennsylvania

- Shocktoberfest logo
- Interactive map of Shocktoberfest
- Location: 94 Park Ave Sinking Spring, PA 19608
- Opened: October 1991
- Operated by: Patrick Konopelski
- Theme: Halloween
- Operating season: Fall
- Website: Official website

Shocktoberfest is an annual haunted event near Reading, Pennsylvania. The attractions include dark attractions, haunted houses, and a haunted hayride. It is referred to by the management of Shocktoberfest as a "haunted theme park" even though it is not a theme park in the true sense of the term.

The attraction opened in 1991 at Willow Glen Park and has become a holiday destination for teenagers and families throughout the Mid-Atlantic states during the Halloween season. Over the years, it has grown from a single hayride into thirteen attractions and a number of special events on weekends over a two-month period.

== History ==
The site of the attraction is situated adjacent to Route 422, outside Reading, Pennsylvania, buffered by a creek, Norfolk Southern railroad tracks, and a housing development. Early land records show a much larger parcel than what is now called Willow Glen Park. Some of the land became Graffius Burial Vault Company and other pieces became part of the housing development.

According to Shocktoberfest's marketing, the land has a supposedly troubled past. They say that the land was home to a state psychiatric hospital, a state penitentiary, and a chemical processing plant. This information has proved to be a marketing ploy, as the land was never used for any of these purposes. However, claims of the Graffius Burial Vault Company being a short walk away are true, although it is not a part of Shocktoberfest.

The attraction began in 1991 as a haunted hayride called Maniac Mountain. A haunted house was added in 1997, and the name was changed to Shocktoberfest. Beginning in 2000, a period of expansion began, with improvements to the two existing attractions, as well as the addition of a new haunt in 2004, The Prison of the Dead. In 2006, Shocktoberfest was selected as one of the Top 13 Haunted Attractions in the country by Haunt World Magazine.

== Attractions ==
=== Haunted Hayride ===
The hayride attraction has its route changed and is re-themed yearly. The BioHazard Hayride was the title and theme in 2009. The attraction was entitled Zombie Revenge Haunted Hayride in 2012. As of 2014, it was entitled the Zombie Safari Hayride.

=== The Prison of the Dead ===
A 50,000-square-foot (4,600 m^{2}) attraction which was built for the 2004 season. It is a two-level attraction, with portions both indoors and outdoors, themed as a prison. Guests begin their tour by boarding a prison bus. The tour of the actual maze is approximately a 30-minute walk, and sometimes, crawl. This is thought to be the premier attraction on the site, and its primary haunted house.

=== The Monster Midway ===
The Monster Midway located at the entrance of the park. This is set up in a carnival fashion where there will be food, classic side shows, and games. The Midway used to feature carnival rides for a few years, however they have been removed since 2004. Ticket purchasing can also be found here. And also the entrances for The Prison of the Dead and the BioHazard Hayride can be found towards the end of the Midway.

=== Ground Assault: Zombie Laser Tag ===
A laser tag experience that allows customers to shoot both each other and zombies, launched in 2016.

=== The Unknown 2.0 ===
This is Shocktoberfest's secondary haunted house. Although smaller than the Prison of the Dead house, it is said to be equally intense. In addition to its regular use, the Almost Naked and Scared Challenge (below) is held here once per evening, on Friday and Saturday only.

=== The Almost Naked and Scared Challenge ===
The Naked and Scared Challenge is an adults-only experience. Visitors at least 18 years old are invited to disrobe before entering the attraction. After choosing the "nude" or "prude" (underwear-only) option, guests are asked to sign waivers prior to a clothes-free fright. The nude option was cancelled prior to opening, due to pressure from local authorities. This event began during the 2013 season, and is still running as of 2017 as the Almost Naked and Scared Challenge.

== Awards ==
- 2006 Shocktoberfest is selected as one of the Top 13 Haunted Attractions in the Country by Haunt World Magazine.
- 2009 Shocktoberfest was voted #1 Must See Haunted Attraction in America by Haunted Attraction Magazine
- 2010 Chosen by the Travel Channel as one of the Scariest Places on Earth.
- 2013 Selected as Top Choice Haunted Attraction by Fright Times Magazine
- 2013, 2014, 2015 Voted Hayride of the Year by Frighttour.com
- 2014 Number 6 Most Extreme Haunted House in the Country by Fox News
- 2015 Voted Third Best Extreme Haunted Attraction by USA Today
- 2015, 2016 Rated One of America's Top Haunts by the Haunted Attraction Association.
