= Man Vs Weird =

- Genre: Reality Television
- Developed by: Leon Campbell; Roxanne Liley; James Peters
- Directed by: Sam Eastall; Lucy Bing
- Presented by: Simon Farnaby
- Narrated by: Simon Farnaby
- Theme music composer: Workhouse
- Country of origin: United Kingdom
- Original language: English
- No. of seasons: 1
- No. of episodes: 4

Production
- Executive producer: Sarah Fink
- Producer: Ceri Hubbard
- Editors: Eddie Haselden; Ian Garvin
- Running time: 47 Minutes (Excluding Commercials)
- Production company: Twenty Twenty

Original release
- Network: Channel 4
- Release: 12 May – 2 June 2014

Man Vs Weird is British reality television show produced by Twenty Twenty and broadcast on Channel 4 from 12 May to 2 June 2014.

== The Show ==
The program features actor Simon Farnaby traveling the world in search on people with incredible talents and unusual abilities such as Biba Struja who claims to be immune to electricity and Zamora The Torture King.

== Episodes ==
Episode	Title	Description	Airdate
1	Superhuman Force	Comedian Simon Farnaby travels the world meeting people who claim to have extraordinary abilities. His journey begins in rural Croatia with nine-year-old internet sensation Ivan, who is believed by many to have magnetic powers. Then, in Georgia, he watches as Etibar Elchiyev, known as the 'Magnetic Man', sticks 44 spoons to his body. Moving on to a village near Belgrade, he encounters a man who says he can store electricity in his body. Plus, in Budapest, can Laszlo Harasztosi pass on his powers to Simon?	12 May 2014
2	Superhuman Strength	Simon Farnaby travels the world encountering people who claim to have special powers, witnessing death-defying stunts and feats of extreme human endurance. His journey begins in Indonesia, where he watches the Banten tribespeople cut and burn themselves seemingly without injury or pain as part of a sacred ritual. In China, he meets the performer Guang, who can pull a car along a street with just a rope attached to his eye sockets. In Los Angeles, sideshow legend Zamora the Torture King pierces his body with metal skewers, while Shaolin master Hu Giong takes a drill to his skull — and even teaches Simon some of his super-strength tricks.	19 May 2014
3	Superhuman Minds	Simon Farnaby travels the globe encountering people who claim to perform miraculous feats using only the power of their minds. The comedian meets Indonesia's leading shaman, Ngurah Harta, who appears to cut him with a razor without injury. In Romania, he wants to find out whether renowned healer Zinaida can make him levitate, and in Amsterdam, he submits to the stare of divine gazer Braco. There's also a visit to Croatia to see Goran the human fish, and finally Los Angeles, where Master Zhou says his healing energy is so strong it creates steam.	26 May 2014
4	The Supernatural	Having travelled the world to meet people who claim to possess extraordinary powers, comedian Simon Farnaby returns to the UK to lift the lid on the world of psychics, mediums and the paranormal. He encounters a man who thinks he can see the future in his dreams, finds out how a surgeon apparently operates without cutting his patients' skin, and is taken on his first ghost hunt.	2 June 2014
