= Blackout (horror experience) =

Immersive horror experience

Blackout, also known as Blackout Haunted House, is an immersive horror experience that was created by Josh Randall and Kristjan Thor in 2009. The simulated haunted house aims to serve as the antithesis of the traditional haunted house. Randall and Thor began collaborating on Blackout after expressing frustration that it was growing increasingly difficult to be scared. The first Blackout event was held in New York City and the business expanded to Los Angeles. Both Randall and Thor have stated that they view Blackout to be more "performance art than haunted house".

== Event ==
Participants must sign a liability waiver prior to entering the experience, as Blackout performers are able to touch and physically interact with the participants, although participants may not touch performers. The attraction's features will differ depending on the location and will change over time in order to avoid participants predicting what will occur. At the start of each Blackout event a performer may ask participants about their worst fears, which they can then use to tailor the event to make the attraction more frightening. Participants are sent into the event individually instead of in a group and they are also not allowed to speak while going through Blackout, although they are allowed to scream.

== Documentary ==
A documentary film entitled The Blackout Experiments was released in 2016. Critical reception for the documentary has been mostly mixed. The documentary takes a look at the event and features interviews with several fans that will repeatedly attend Blackout events. Randall and Thor limited their participation with the film, as they wanted the event to retain as much mystery as possible.

== Reception ==
io9 wrote a favorable review for Blackout, stating that participants must be comfortable with potential nudity and being touched. Gizmodo also praised Blackout, remarking that although they had been through the event twice they still found the experience unnerving. The Los Angeles Times remarked favorably on the Los Angeles Blackout, writing "Visually, Blackout is artful and occasionally kind of beautiful, evoking early ambient horror films like Carl Theodor Dreyer's "Vampyr."" The New York Observer was slightly more critical, commenting that although they had been given a safe word during a 2011 Blackout event in New York City, some of Blackout's scares made it difficult for participants to speak and that they had not found the experience fun.

Feminist publications such as XoJane criticized the event's concept, and XoJane wrote that they felt that they were "not entirely comfortable with the idea that simulated sexual assault and torture should be marketed as entertainment." Randall and Thor responded to these criticisms, stating that they were aware of the sensitive subject matter and that the experience "should be deeper than shock value, it's about finding what an actor and audience is interested in, and make them interested in going to that place. We try to be as clear as possible about what people are in for."
