= Spinning tunnel =

Device for various rides and attractions

Spinning tunnels—which are also known as vortex tunnels or rotating tunnels—are devices used at haunted attractions and amusement parks. When people walk through the center of a spinning tunnel they can experience vertigo and a loss of equilibrium as their brains receive conflicting signals from their bodies and senses. Also a pseudo force (imaginary) is felt by them when walking through the tunnel since the brain tries to make sense of the things happening around the patron, hence a pseudo centrifugal force is felt by them.

The traditional version of the spinning tunnel consists of a tube made up of a series of rings which is typically up to 10 feet (3.0 m) high and up to 20 feet (6.1 m) long. The tunnel liner bears images or designs that create the illusion of movement while the tunnel is in motion.

Another type of tunnel uses a stationary tube with LEDs or rope lighting embedded in the walls which light up in patterns designed to mimic motion.

Laser tunnels that can be contained in a domed enclosure are favored by the home haunting industry. Made from parts acquired at local hardware or discount department store, the tunnels are built using LEDs, incandescent or fluorescent lights, blacklights or lasers—or any combination thereof—paired up with a laser vortex. The laser vortex lighting system projects a rotating pattern onto the mist or fog provided by a fog machine, creating the illusion of a moving vortex.

Traversing the tunnel is a beam bridge, usually about 36 inches (91 cm) wide and about 15 inches (38 cm) high, which provides the pathway for visitors to pass through the attraction. Handrails securely fastened along the length of the bridge are necessary for the safety of the participants. Lighting for the tunnel can be mounted under the eaves of the bridge or beneath the handrails, and may consist of rotating colored lights, high-powered LED lights, laser lights or blacklight fixtures. In the case of the laser vortex tunnel, the lighting may be mounted on the floor. The bridges or walkways can be designed to tilt, wobble or vibrate as visitors proceed along the path, providing unstable footing and causing a further loss of balance.

For those tunnels not enclosed in buildings, there are various types of enclosures designed to protect the tunnel from the weather and vandals, and to keep visitors safe from contact with moving parts.

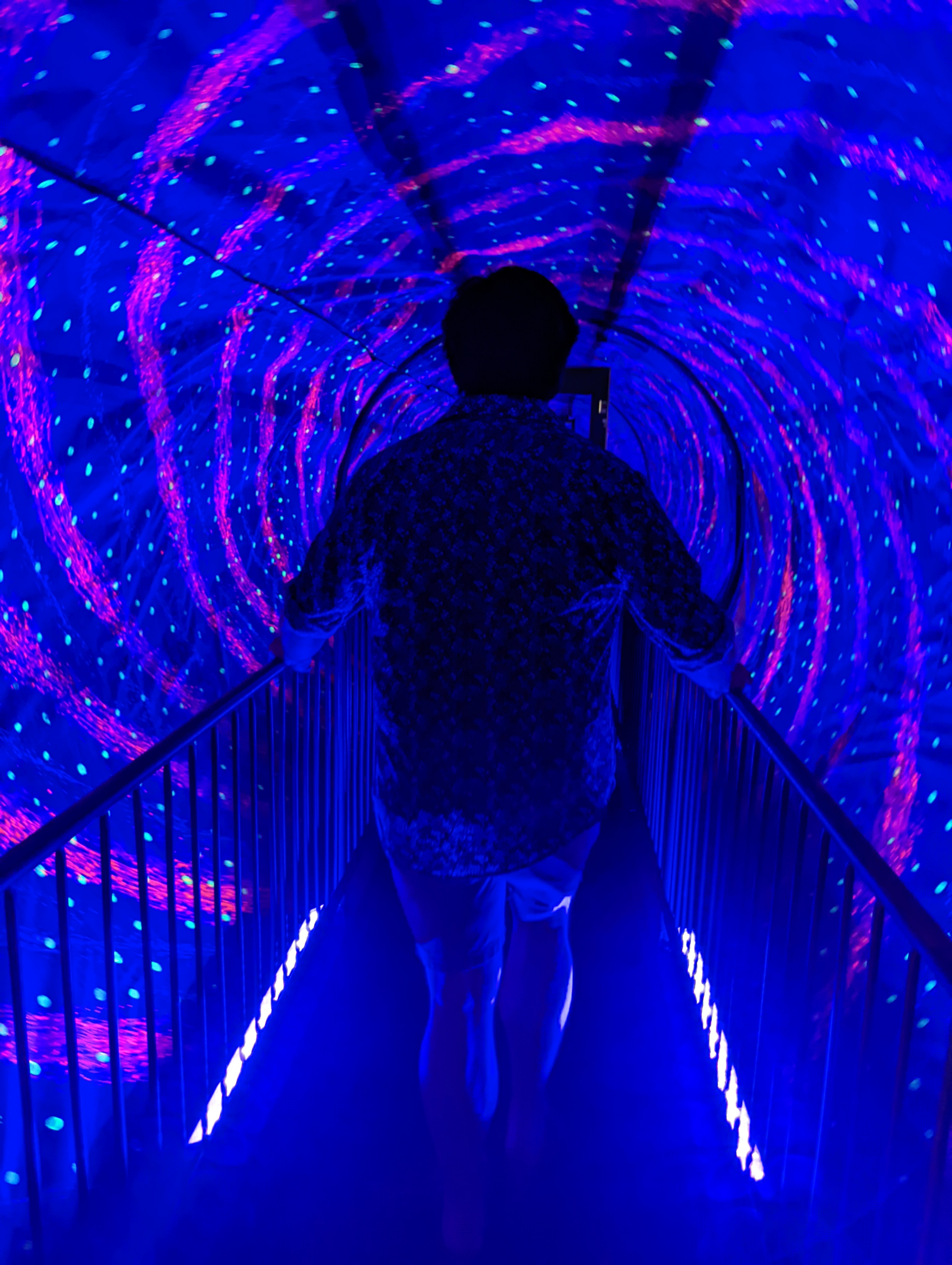
Person entering a vortex tunnel

== Background ==
Spinning tunnels depend upon creating sensory confusion between the kinesthetic system, the vestibular system and the visual system. The body's sense of the motion and the position of the limbs is provided by sensors in the joints, the semicircular canals within the inner ears provide sensory data for the head's position relative to the ground, and the eyes provide input concerning where the body is in relationship to its external environment. The spinning tunnel creates an optical illusion affecting the visual system that is in conflict with the other two sensory systems. Because vision is the most developed of the human senses, the visual system overrides the other sensory systems, causing the brain to believe that the bridge is moving. This belief interferes with the sense of balance and induces dizziness and vertigo. Aristotle noted the effect while observing a waterfall, noticing that over time the water seemed to stop moving and the rocks protruding through the waterfall seemed to be moving upward. This phenomenon has come to be known as the waterfall illusion.

== Rotating tunnels ==
The rotating tunnel consists of a cylinder made of large rings secured together by trusses, rods, or braces. Typically 8–10 feet (2.4–3.0 m) in diameter and 10–20 feet (3.0–6.1 m) in length, the rings of the cylinder ride on hard rubber tires, large pulleys or spoked rims (as found on a bicycle without the tire). One of the wheels is connected by a belt or chain to an AC motor which drives the cylinder at a rate of 4–10 revolutions per minute (rpm). Some varieties use a motor mounted above the tunnel. The tunnel is easily stopped as there is no direct connection between the motor and the tunnel. The tunnel is lined with fabric or plastic sheeting that has been painted or imprinted with various designs or images. When the tunnel is rotating, the designs or images create the illusion of movement counter to the rotation. Running through the tunnel is a suspended bridge, usually 28–36 inches (710–910 mm) wide and 8–16 inches (200–410 mm) high. At 36 inches wide, the bridge is wheelchair-accessible. Handrails line the bridge to keep patrons from falling off the sides into the rotating tube, preventing injury to themselves or damage to the tunnel.

=== Construction and materials ===
The construction of a spinning tunnel is formed of several discrete components. There is the base or framework, the tunnel, the drive mechanism, the lighting system, and the bridge or walkway. These components can be made of nearly any material, such as plywood, metals like aluminum or steel, or PVC piping, as long as the materials used can take the weight of the tunnel and the weight of the guests passing through.

==== Framework ====
The base of the spinning tunnel holds the guide wheels that the tunnel rings rest and roll on. The drive motor for the tunnel that has the drive motor driving the guide wheels will also be installed on this framework. The tunnels that have a drive motor above the tunnel will have a vertical framework that is attached to the base. The guide wheels can be bicycle rims or pulleys which also hold the tunnel in place as it spins. Tunnels that use the hard rubber wheels will have an extra set of horizontal wheels at both ends, attached to the bridge, to keep the tunnel from moving off the guide wheels. The bridge is also mounted to the base.

==== Tunnel ====
The tunnel is constructed of a series of two to eight rings, usually eight to ten feet in diameter to allow headroom for the people using the tunnel. The vertical rings are connected to horizontal braces forming a cylinder similar in shape to a large coffee can with the ends removed. The interior of the spinning tunnel is lined with fabric or plastic sheeting, secured to the rings and braces in whatever manner is expedient to the builder or designer of the tunnel. Velcro straps, duct tape, and staples are used in different constructions. The liner can be printed or decorated with images or abstract designs that draw the eye and further the optical illusion fostered by the rotating liner. The use of fluorescent inks or paint and black lighting can add to the enjoyment of the attraction by creating a spooky, darkly lit environment. Music or other sound effects help to mask the sound of the rotating tunnel and the operation of the drive motor.

==== Lighting systems ====
The lighting systems for the tunnel can consist of regular incandescent lightbulbs or fluorescent lamps, colored lighting using filters, black lights, LEDs or laser lights. The lighting systems are attached to the bridge or the handrail to illuminate the fabric of the tunnel. Blacklights are most useful when there are fluorescent designs on the fabric of the tunnel. All of the different types of lighting can be programmed to flicker or alternate, adding to the sensory disorientation. Fog machines can be used to give the bridge the illusion of floating in midair.

==== Bridge ====
It can be either transparent or lit.

=== Installation ===
The installation of spinning tunnels depends upon the circumstances of the location. It has been recommended that the tunnel be installed in a dark location. The illusion of a spinning tunnel works best if there are no external points of reference. The inside of a permanent structure has the benefit of protection from the elements as well as darkness. A tarp-covered enclosure is also a good method for covering the tunnel. Both of these methods also offer protection to patrons from the moving parts, such as the drive motor and the cylinder itself. Another consideration is the entrance and exit. One method of installation is to put the tunnel in a pit equal to the height of the bridge so that patrons can step directly into and out of the tunnel. This is an especially safe method for the exit as the patrons are usually disoriented by the attraction. If the tunnel is installed on a level surface, a ramp should be used, again to provide safety for the user. Steps can be used if space is limited, but lighting should be provided to illuminate the steps for the patrons' safety. The ends of the tunnel need to be enclosed to prevent light entering and to help control the flow of patrons through the attraction. This can be something as simple as plastic or canvas sheets slit like the entrance to a tent or like a coldroom, or it can consist of walls with doors decorated to look like the entrance to a funhouse or a cave.

Several serious Halloween enthusiasts have built their own tunnels using materials available to the public at local outlets. The plans for these projects can be found on various Internet sites and in Halloween trade magazines.

== Stationary tunnels ==
Another type of spinning tunnel is the stationary LED tunnel. Instead of the tunnel spinning around the bridge, LEDs that are embedded in the walls of the tube are programmed to turn on and off in sequence, presenting the illusion of movement. While the method of visual presentation is different—light is transmitted directly to the eyes rather than reflected off a liner—the effect is the same.

== See also ==
- Haunted attraction (simulated)
- Dark Attraction
- Theatrical smoke and fog
