= Six Flags Fright Fest =

Annual Halloween-oriented haunt event

- Genre: Halloween
- Frequency: Annual
- Location: Legacy Six Flags parks
- Years active: 1986–present
- Website: Official website

Fright Fest (also known as Festival Del Terror at Six Flags México) is a Halloween-themed seasonal event held annually at legacy Six Flags theme parks (Note: "Legacy Six Flags parks" refers to parks owned by Six Flags prior to the company's 2024 merger with Cedar Fair.) in the United States, Canada, and Mexico, as well as three parks owned by EPR Properties. The event normally runs from early September through Halloween, which adds haunted attractions and themed areas named Scare Zones, as well as live entertainment.

Fright Fest was originally called Fright Nights when it debuted at Six Flags AstroWorld in 1986. Following the COVID-19 pandemic, Fright Fest was temporarily renamed Hallowfest in 2020.

== History ==
=== Fright Nights era (1986–1993) ===
After testing various Halloween-based seasonal events throughout the 1970s to mid-1980s, Six Flags, then owned by Bally Manufacturing, created an all-new Halloween event for AstroWorld in 1986 that they named Six Flags Fright Nights.

In 1987, the event began to be expanded to Six Flags' other properties. Six Flags Over Georgia was the second park to introduce the event.

Six Flags Over Mid-America was the third park to introduce Fright Nights in 1988 with Freddy Krueger from A Nightmare on Elm Street as the event's "entertainment chairman". The all-new Fright Nights featured House of the Living Dead, a walk-through inside of the ride building for the Time Tunnel dark ride, as well as the "Terror Train", a horror train show on the Tommy G. Robertson Railroad.

In 1989, Fright Nights debuted at Six Flags Over Texas. Like the parks in Texas and Missouri, Freddy Krueger was the central figure of the event. It featured haunted houses, a trick or treat trail for kids, and more.

=== Fright Fest era (1993–2023) ===
In 1999, Six Flags licensed and opened Alice Cooper's Brutal Planet haunted houses at some parks, featuring music from the album and using similar elements in each house. The next year it became just simply "Brutal Planet" and dropped the Alice Cooper theme. Since then, Six Flags has licensed other intellectual properties for mazes and scare zones, including the Saw films and DC Comics's Suicide Squad.

In 2018, Fright Fest returned to Frontier City and Darien Lake (later renamed as Six Flags Darien Lake since May 4, 2019), two former Six Flags parks re-acquired by the company on May 22, 2018.

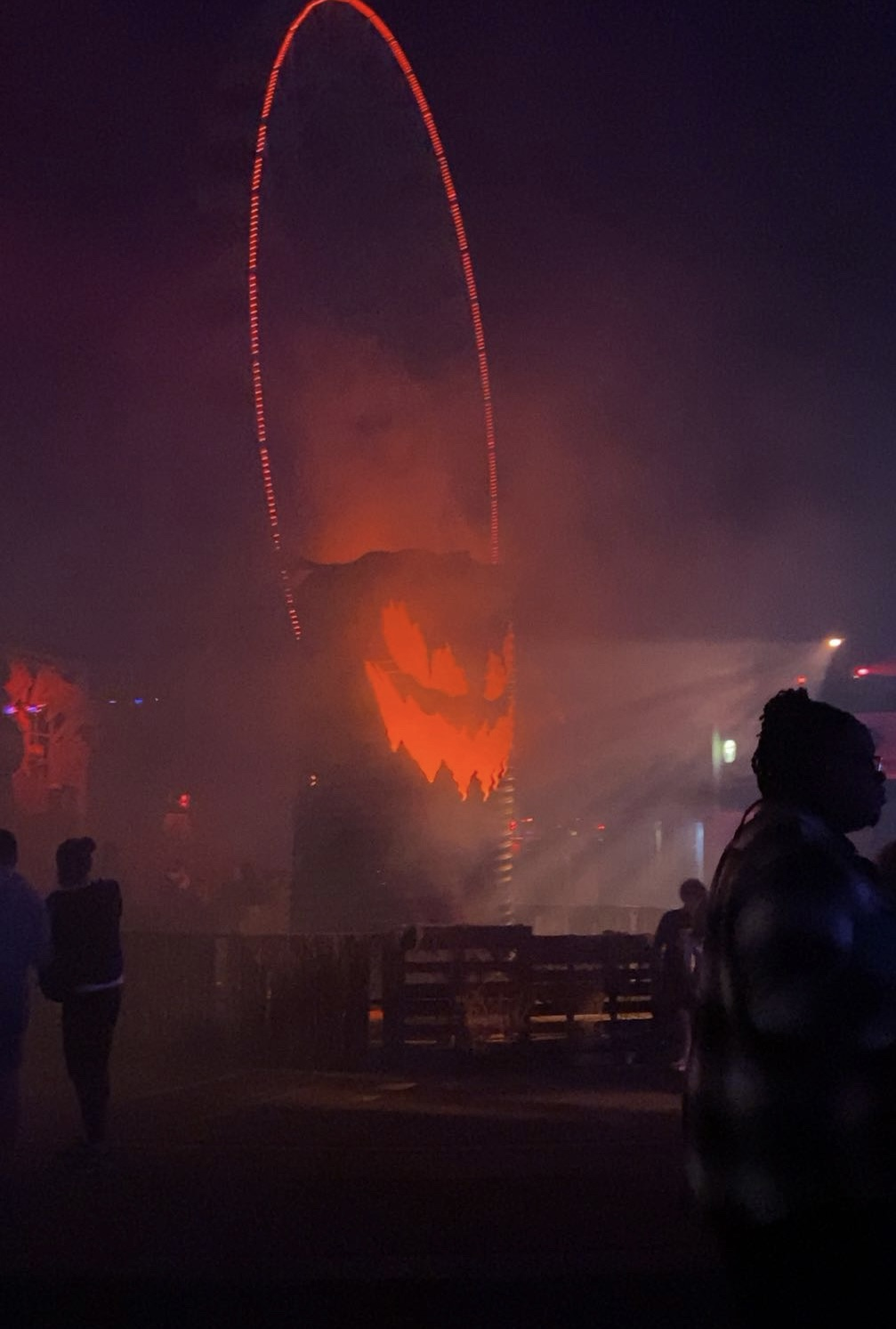
Halloween-themed decor at Six Flags St. Louis

To comply with the new health and safety protocols implemented by Six Flags due to the COVID-19 pandemic during 2020, the company announced that their Halloween event would be rebranded to Hallowfest. The change from Fright Fest to Hallowfest included no haunted houses or indoor shows. Six Flags Discovery Kingdom held a different event called Boo 2020! for the 2020 season, as the park operated as a zoo for the season to act in accordance with local government guidelines with the state.

In 2022, Six Flags introduced another Halloween event alongside Fright Fest, called Kids Boo Fest, a kids-oriented Halloween event with trick-or-treat trails along with in-park entertainment, that is held in mornings. On October 7, 2022, all Six Flags amusement parks implemented a new policy in which it limited the size of bags and subjected all bags to X-ray screening. While a reason for the change was not stated by the parks, an editor from the Theme Park Tribune said the new policies could be related to recent guest altercations, including shootings, at Kennywood and Six Flags Great America.

=== Fright Fest Extreme era (2024–present) ===
On June 25, 2024, Six Flags announced in a press release that the event was rebranded as Fright Fest Extreme. This enhanced version of their annual Halloween event featured haunted attractions inspired by well-known horror franchises, namely Saw, Stranger Things, Army of the Dead, The Conjuring Universe, Trick ‘r Treat, Texas Chainsaw Massacre, and DCeased.

== Attractions and shows ==
Six Flags parks are heavily decorated for Fright Fest, and mainly feature haunted attractions at an extra charge, as well as live entertainment and scare zones. Halloween-based shows are also performed, most notably "Love at First Fright" at Six Flags Great America, Six Flags St. Louis Six Flags New England, and Six Flags Over Texas, as well as opening ceremonies and closing finales such as "Freaks Unleashed" and "Final Freakout" at Six Flags St Louis which brings all the actors into the park for a first and last scare.

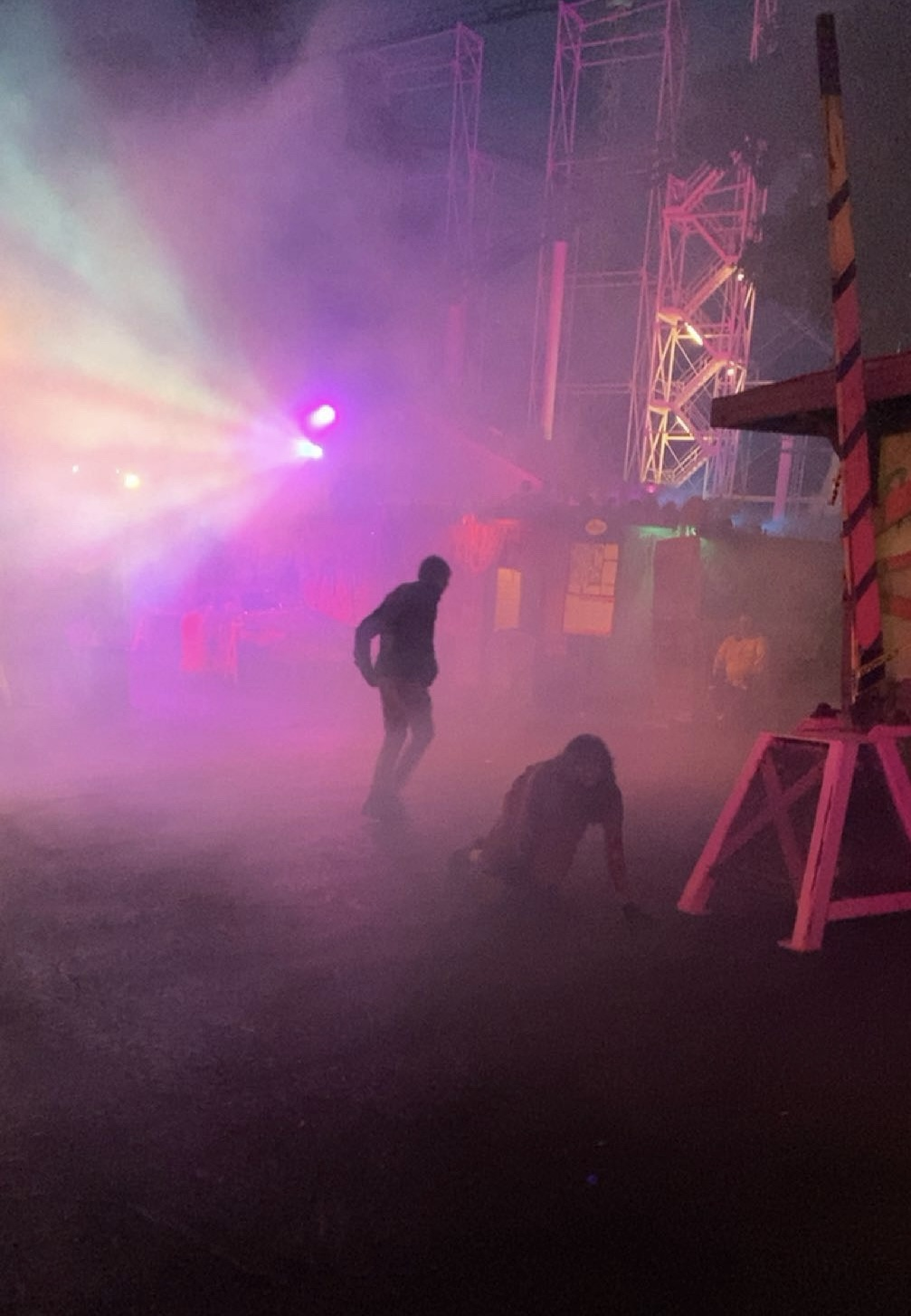
Zombie scare actors

The parks also feature themed "Scare Zones" in designated areas of the park where costumed actors are allowed to scare guests, though these parks also typically include areas where the actors are not allowed, thus allowing a "safe" area for families with small children or otherwise not wanting to be scared.

Many of the parks have similar shows and share names and ideas, like "Dead Man's Party", which is at Six Flags St Louis, Six Flags Over Georgia, Six Flags Great Adventure and Six Flags Over Texas. "The Ringmaster's Cabaret" is another show, but is exclusively shown at Six Flags Great America.

Most also have a specific show that unleashes the monsters into the parks, including "Freaks Unleashed" at Six Flags St. Louis, "Awakening" at Six Flags Great Adventure, Six Flags New England, and Six Flags Discovery Kingdom, "The Uprising" at Six Flags Over Georgia, Six Flags America, Six Flags Great America, "The Arrival" at Six Flags Fiesta Texas, and "Unleashed!" at Six Flags Magic Mountain.

Some parks also have their own respective characters that lead Fright Fest at their park, such as Dr. Diabolical at Six Flags Fiesta Texas and Nox at Six Flags Great America.

== Locations ==
As of July 2025, locations with Fright Fest
Park	Opening season	Last season	Refs
Six Flags AstroWorld	October 1986	October 30, 2005	
Six Flags Over Georgia	October 16, 1987	—N/a	
Six Flags Over Texas	October 15, 1988	—N/a	
Mid America Adventure (Note: Runs as "St. Louis Fright Fest" for 2026 season)	October 19, 1988	November 1, 2026	(Note: Following its sale to EPR Properties and Enchanted Parks in April 2026 and the expiration of the Six Flags licensing deal in 2027, Fright Fest will be replaced into a different fest as Fright Fest is a registered trademark of Six Flags.)
Frontier City	October 7, 1989	—N/a	
Six Flags Great America	October 19, 1991	—N/a	
Six Flags Great Adventure	October 17, 1992	—N/a	
Six Flags Magic Mountain	October 16, 1993	—N/a	
Six Flags Fiesta Texas	October 1996	—N/a	
Six Flags Darien Lake	October 1998 (original); October 2018 (revival)	October 2006 (original) October 2025 (revival)	(Note: Fright Fest did not operate from 2007 to 2017, when Darien Lake was not operating as a Six Flags park)
Six Flags America	October 1999	October 27, 2024	
Six Flags Discovery Kingdom	October 1999	October 2025	
Six Flags Elitch Gardens	October 1999	October 2006	(Note: Elitch Gardens was sold to PARC Management in 2007, and PARC Management originally replaced Fright Fest with "Fall Family Fun Fest" after purchasing the park, adding family oriented areas such as hay mazes and pumpkin painting. The event was rebranded again as "FrightFest" from 2008 onward, avoiding the space between the words Fright and Fest as Fright Fest is a registered trademark of Six Flags. This continued in the years 2011–2014 when Herschend Family Entertainment managed the property. Elitch Gardens is currently managed by Premier Parks, LLC, and FrightFest remains.)
Six Flags Kentucky Kingdom	October 1999	October 2009	
Great Escape	October 1999	October 25, 2026	(Note: Following its sale to EPR Properties and Enchanted Parks in April 2026 and the expiration of the Six Flags licensing deal in 2027, Fright Fest will be replaced into a different fest as Fright Fest is a registered trademark of Six Flags.)
Six Flags New England	October 6, 2000	—N/a	
Six Flags Worlds of Adventure	October 6, 2000	November 2, 2003	(Note: Six Flags Worlds of Adventure was sold to Cedar Fair following the 2003 season.)
La Ronde	October 2002	November 1, 2026	(Note: Following its sale to EPR Properties and La Ronde Operations in May 2026 and the expiration of the Six Flags licensing deal in 2027, Fright Fest will be replaced into a different fest as Fright Fest is a registered trademark of Six Flags.)
Six Flags Mexico	October 2012	—N/a	

== Awards ==
Fright Fest at Six Flags Magic Mountain has won USA Today's Reader's Choice Award for Best Theme Park Halloween Event twice, in 2016 and 2017. Additionally, Fright Fest for all parks has also been nominated for the same category in 2022, placing second place, behind Kings Island’s Halloween Haunt.

== See also ==
- Holiday in the Park, a Six Flags holiday season event.
- Knott's Scary Farm, a Halloween event at Knott's Berry Farm.
- Howl-O-Scream, a Halloween event by United Parks & Resorts (Busch Gardens, SeaWorld).
- Los Angeles Haunted Hayride, a Halloween event in Griffith Park.
- Queen Mary's Dark Harbor, a Halloween event at the RMS Queen Mary in Long Beach, California.
- Universal's Halloween Horror Nights, a Halloween event at Universal Destinations & Experiences parks.
