= Ed Alonzo =

Mexican American comedian, actor, and professional magician (born 1962)

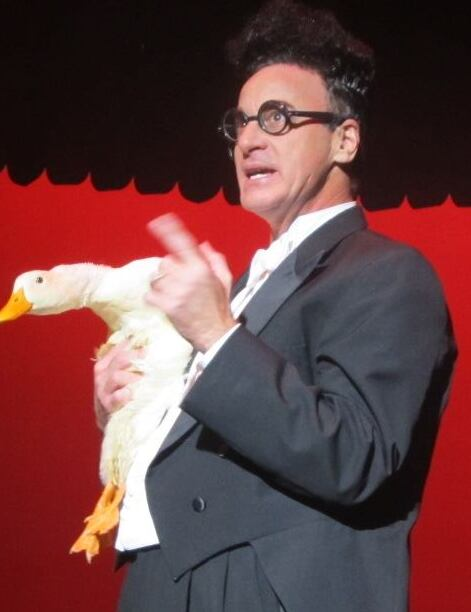
- Ed Alonzo holding "Bob the Duck" while performing at Kings Island on October 27, 2013
- Born: July 26, 1962 (age 63); California, U.S.
- Occupations: Magician; comedian; actor

Ed Alonzo (born July 26, 1962) is an American comedian, actor, and professional magician.

== Acting career ==
Alonzo had roles on Saved by the Bell (20 episodes between 1989–1990), Head of the Class and Totally Hidden Video. He also had guest starring roles on Full House, Murphy Brown, and Xuxa. Alonzo performed a special daily show incorporating his comedy and magic at California's Great America. Alonzo has also performed for Knott's Berry Farm, Valleyfair!, and Worlds of Fun, and appeared on one episode of Cycle 11's America's Next Top Model. In 2009 he worked with Britney Spears to create illusions for her 2009 The Circus Starring Britney Spears tour. He also had a role on How I Met Your Mother as a security guard, and appeared in an episode of Modern Family as a magician named Kaiser Mayhem.

Alonzo was one of the magicians working on Michael Jackson's This Is It concerts as part of Jackson's crew in the rehearsal which took place the night before Jackson's death on June 25, 2009. He has also worked with Britney Spears, Katy Perry, and magician David Blaine.

He also has a show at Knotts Halloween Haunt called Ed Alonzo's Psycho Circus of Magic and Mayhem. At Kings Island in Mason, Ohio, he performed his show Ed Alonzo's Psycho Circus of Magic and Mayhem both summers of 2012 and 2013. He performed as part of Worlds of Fun Halloween Haunt for the Haunt seasons of 2014, 2015 and again performed in the 2016 season at the Tivoli Theatre.

Alonzo reprised his role as Max the magician/owner of Max's Diner in the reboot/sequel Saved by the Bell television series on Peacock streaming network.

He has been performing his magic show on Royal Caribbean Cruise Lines as recently as 2026.

== Awards ==
- The Academy of Magical Arts Junior Achievement Award (1982)
- The Academy of Magical Arts Stage Magician of the Year (1999, 2000)
- The Academy of Magical Arts Comedy Magician of the Year (2005, 2006)
- The Academy of Magical Arts Magician of the Year (2009)
