= Chipper Lowell =

American comedian and magician

Chipper Lowell is an American comedian and magician. Lowell was born in Massachusetts, United States, to a circus-travelling family. At the age of 17, he began performing solo shows. Lowell's influences include vaudeville, stand-up comedy, and improvisational comedy. In addition to performing live shows, he is a writer, producer and consultant for theater, television and film projects.
