= Zamora the Torture King =

American sideshow performer

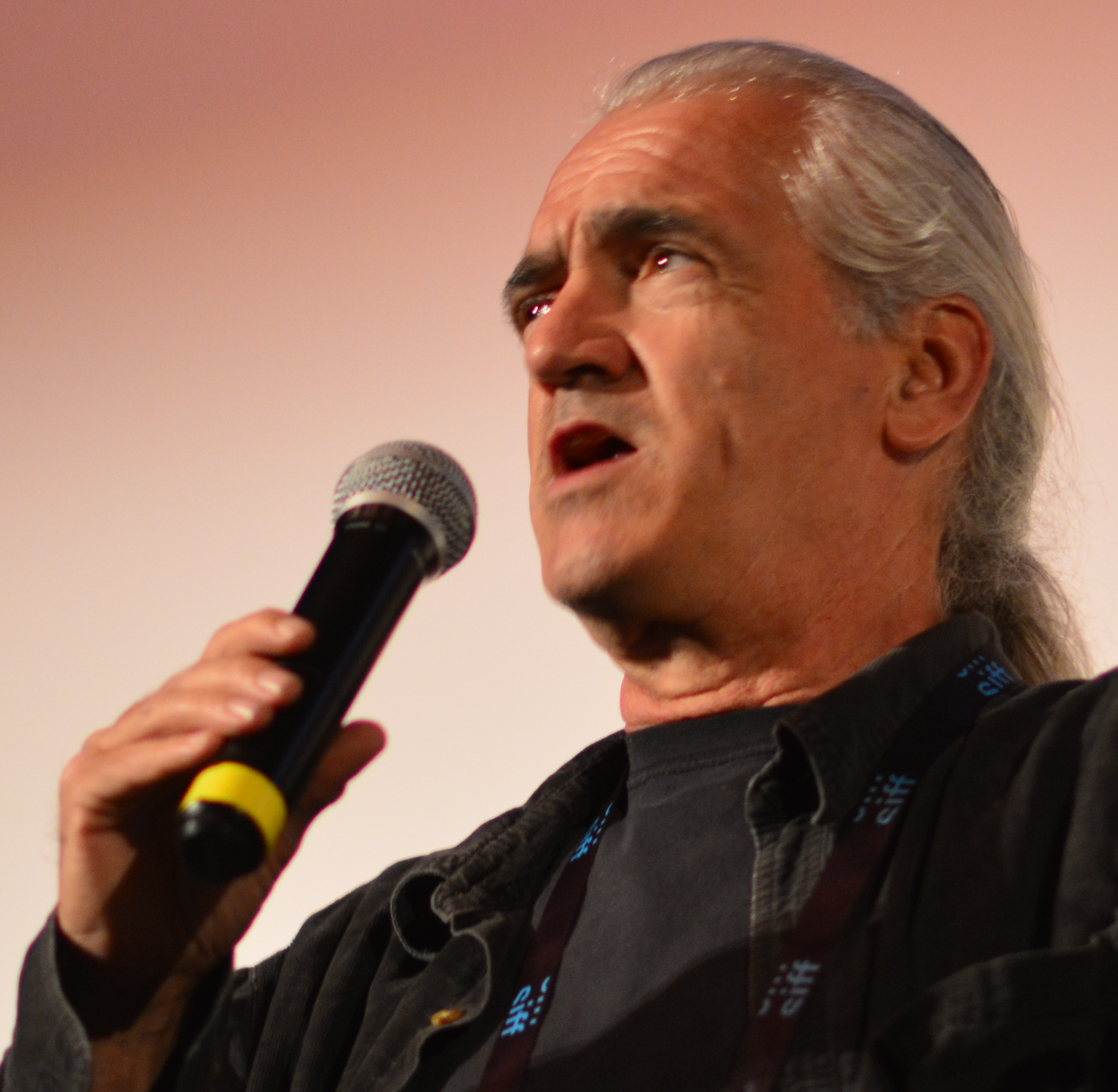
Tim "Zamora the Torture King" Cridland, 2023

Zamora the Torture King is the stage name of Tim Cridland, an American sideshow performer. Zamora was an original member of the Jim Rose Circus, where he performed painful feats as entertainment. His stunts include fire eating, sword swallowing, body skewering and electric shock. Zamora co-authored (with Jan Gregor) Circus of the Scars, a history of the Jim Rose Circus. In 2022 Gregor produced a 96 minute documentary with the same title, featuring Cridland and other stars of the circus.

Zamora has been featured on Ripley's Believe It or Not!, 48 Hours, Man Vs Weird and Stan Lee's Superhumans.
