= Howl-O-Scream =

Halloween event at Busch Gardens and SeaWorld parks

- Entrance sign from Howl-O-Scream at Busch Gardens Tampa Bay in 2003
- Genre: Halloween
- Frequency: Annual
- Locations: Busch Gardens Tampa Bay; Busch Gardens Williamsburg; SeaWorld San Antonio; SeaWorld Orlando; SeaWorld San Diego
- Inaugurated: 1999; 27 years ago
- Website: Official website

Howl-O-Scream is an annual Halloween seasonal event hosted by United Parks & Resorts, occurring during the month of October at Busch Gardens Tampa Bay, Busch Gardens Williamsburg, SeaWorld San Antonio, SeaWorld Orlando, and SeaWorld San Diego. The parks operate normally during the day and transition to Howl-O-Scream in the evening. The event features haunted houses, "scare zones" with scare actors, and live entertainment. The event debuted in 1999 at Busch Gardens Tampa Bay and Busch Gardens Williamsburg. It was introduced at SeaWorld San Antonio in 2008

Howl-O-Scream contains adult content such as violence, gore and blood, and sexual innuendos. The event is intended for adults and individuals under the age of 18 are not admitted.

== Event summary ==
The event takes place during select nights in October, typically on the weekends. The event focuses on haunted houses, "scare zones," and live shows that pertain to a particular theme.

The haunted houses or "scare mazes" are enclosed areas with storylines and highly themed decor. They lead guests through claustrophobic mazes with various features designed to startle and confuse, such as strobe lights and fog machines.

Scare zones are similar to haunted houses, but are set in designated outdoor areas along main paths. Scare zones also feature specific themes and decor, and primarily focus on live scare actors startling guests in the area.

The live shows are themed shows relating to Halloween and to scare mazes within the park.

The lineup of haunted houses, scare zones, and live shows change every year, with new attractions being introduced as old ones retire.

== Year-by-year evolution ==
=== Busch Gardens Tampa Bay ===
The year 1999 saw the debut of Howl-O-Scream at Busch Gardens Tampa Bay and Busch Gardens Williamsburg. Howl-O-Scream replaced a smaller and more family-oriented Halloween event called Spooky Safari at the Tampa Bay location.

The debut event opened with four haunted experiences: two haunted houses, one haunted trail, and a hay ride. Shows included a celebrity appearance by Butch Patrick of The Munsters, and mentalist The Amazing Kreskin. There was one park-wide scare zone. The 1961 Cadillac hearse from Creature Feature was also on display. In an effort to maintain attendance from younger audiences, a "Monster Free Zone" was included, featuring face painting, arts and crafts, and hay rides.

In 2001, Howl-O-Scream added new haunted mazes, scare zones, and shows, and further oriented the event toward an older teen and young adult demographic. The park's "Land of the Dragons" children's area continued to offer activities for younger children. There were five haunted houses, three scare zones, and two live shows. The shows were produced by the park.

In 2002, Howl-O-Scream featured six haunted houses, four scare zones, and two live shows.

The park further refined the event for 2003. There were four haunted houses, one haunted trail, five scare zones, and three live shows. Two shows were produced by the park, but the third show was brought in by a vendor.

Howl-O-Scream returned in 2004. However, multiple storms from the 2004 Atlantic hurricane season delayed the start of the event. Hurricane Jeanne was the most damaging, causing an F1 tornado touchdown on one of the haunted house buildings, destroying it. The hurricane itself also caused moderate damage to props in several scare zones. The haunt held in the destroyed building was moved elsewhere in the park, and the destroyed props were rebuilt. There were five haunted houses, one haunted trail, four scare zones, and two live shows.

2005 featured six haunted houses, five scare zones and two shows. In 2005, a small fire started in the front of "The Hunted" haunted house. The building was evacuated and closed, and no injuries were reported. The haunted house reopened within a matter of hours. The fire was traced to a guest's cigarette, put out carelessly on a prop couch.

Howl-O-Scream 2006 featured six haunted houses, five scare zones, and three live shows. 2007 saw six haunted houses, five scare zones, and three live shows. 2008 consisted of six haunted houses, four scare zones, and three live shows. This year also marked the park's first use of a Howl-O-Scream website to build interest for the event all year with teasers.

2009 was Howl-O-Scream's tenth anniversary. It featured seven haunts, five scare zones, and five live shows. One of the new shows featured Jason Byrne, an award-winning stage magician. Also new was Club Envy, an upcharge adults only nightclub.

In 2010 there were eight haunted houses, six scare zones, and three live shows. Upcharge haunted houses were introduced in 2010 as well. 2011 featured seven haunted houses and two live shows. Specific scare zones were eliminated in favor of scare actors roaming freely across the entire park.

2012 featured seven haunted houses, two scare zones, and one live show. The "Faded Memories" zone was a retrospective of all the past years of Howl-O-Scream. 2013 featured eight haunted houses, three scare zones, and one live show.

In 2014, there were eight haunted houses, no scare zones, and one live show. 2015 consisted of seven haunted houses, one scare zone, and one live show.

In 2025, a new haunted house entitled M.A.R.S. (Mars Alien Research Station) was introduced.

=== Busch Gardens Williamsburg ===
In 2014, there were five haunted houses, a park-wide scare zone, and two live shows. 2015 consisted of seven haunted houses, five scare zones, and three shows.

=== SeaWorld Orlando ===
Howl-O-Scream at SeaWorld Orlando in 2026 featured several haunted houses and attractions, including one themed to the movie I Know What You Did Last Summer.

== See also ==
- Halloween Spooktacular
- Universal's Halloween Horror Nights
- Six Flags Fright Fest, a Halloween event at Six Flags parks
