= Haunted attraction =

Horror-themed recreational venue

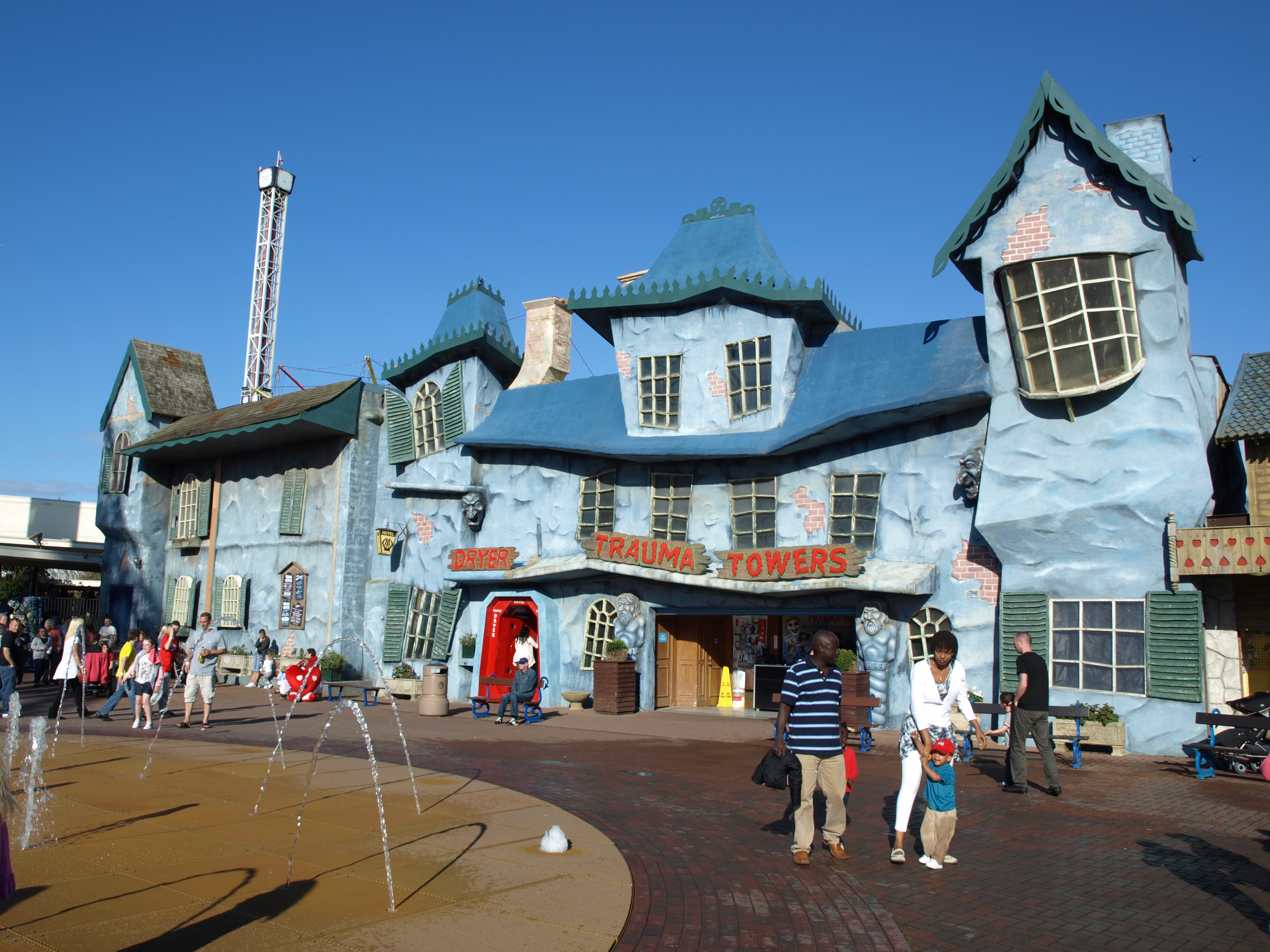
Trauma Towers at Blackpool Pleasure Beach in Blackpool, England. Originally called "The Haunted Hotel".

A haunted attraction or haunted house ride is a form of live entertainment that simulates visiting haunted locations or experiencing horror scenarios. They usually feature fearsome sets and characters, especially demons, ghosts, skeletons, zombies, monsters, possessed people, witches, serial killers, and slashers. Humorous characters may also be included.

Haunted attractions may be set up at many kinds of locations. Built attractions or existing structures in which attractions may be operated include temporarily constructed simulations of haunted houses; actual abandoned or dilapidated houses; abandoned asylums; defunct prisons; defunct or active amusement parks; defunct or active ships; defunct factories; defunct or active barns; and shopping malls. Outdoor places hosting such attractions include corn mazes or cornfields; hedge mazes; farms (often including "haunted" hayrides); wooded areas or forests; and parks.

Haunted attractions (also known as "haunts" or "mazes" within the industry) use many effects, such as intense lighting (strobe lights, black lights, etc.), animatronics, CGI, scent dispensers, fog machines, spinning tunnels, air blasters, spooky old antiques, gory images, and intense scenes of horror, terror, torment, murder, mischief, or comedy. Visitors often encounter actors in elaborate and often scary costumes, masks, and prosthetics. They may perform skits or lurk and come out unexpectedly to frighten, shock, disturb, or amuse the customer. If the horror attraction includes a storyline, it may also include a character that serves as the main antagonist in the attraction's story.

Haunted attractions typically operate from the last week of late September or early October to the last week in October or first week of November. In particular, they are especially active during the triduum of Allhallowtide. There is also a subculture of permanent haunted attractions that are open year-round, and a few that are open for special occasions, such as haunt conventions or Spring Break (also called Scream Break). Some attractions are run by charities as fundraisers.

In Japan, there is a tradition of making obakeyashiki (ghost houses) in the summertime, as fear is believed to ward off the heat by "giving you the chills". They typically feature frightening creatures from Japanese folklore, ghosts, demons, sinister crucifixes and other things that are brought to life thanks to decorations, sound effects and animatronics. A story is often told to visitors before they receive a mission that they must accomplish in the house.

== History ==
One of the first recorded purpose-built haunted attractions was the Orton and Spooner Ghost House, which opened in 1915 in Liphook in Hampshire, England. Closely resembling a carnival fun house, it was powered by steam. It still exists, in the Hollycombe Steam Collection.

The background for the creation of the Orton and Spooner Ghost House might be seen in 18th- and 19th-century London and Paris, when literature, performances by magicians, spiritualists and psychics, as well as theatrical shows and attractions introduced the public to gruesome entertainment. In 1802, Marie Tussaud scandalized British audiences with an exhibition of wax sculptures of decapitated victims of the French Revolution, including King Louis XVI, Marie Antoinette, Robespierre and Jean-Paul Marat. Her exhibits exist today as the Chamber of Horrors in Madam Tussauds in London. In France, from 1897, the Grand Guignol theatre was scaring audiences with graphically staged horror entertainment. The Phantasmagoria show existed even earlier, but a well-known version in 1797 Paris was the Fantasmagorie, which made use of magic lantern projections and crude special effects.

Halloween-themed haunted houses in America seemed to begin emerging during the Great Depression, about the same time as trick-or-treating. During the 1930s, 1940s and 1950s, it was common for magicians to use supernatural themes in their stage performances, which evolve into the tradition of a traveling ghost show, also referred to as a spook show or creep show, and incorporate comedy, displays of mentalism and theatrical special effects. During the 1950s these specialized shows were often performed as pre-show entertainment before screenings of popular horror movies.

The Haunted Mansion opened in Disneyland on August 9, 1969, and was highly successful, soon gaining a single-day record of 82,516 guests. In 1973, Knott's Berry Farm began hosting its own Halloween night attraction, Knott's Scary Farm. Evangelical Christians became early adopters of alternative Halloween attractions; Jerry Falwell and Liberty University introduced one of the first "Hell houses" in 1972.

During the late 1950s, California was a focus for Halloween haunts. In 1957, the San Mateo Haunted House opened, sponsored by the Children's Health Home Junior Auxiliary. The San Bernardino Assistance League Haunted House opened in 1958. In 1962 and 1963 home haunts began appearing across the country, including Oregon, California, Connecticut, Illinois, and several other states. On October 17, 1964, the San Manteo Haunted House opened as a walk-through haunted house. The Children's Museum Haunted House in Indianapolis, open every year since 1964, was Indiana's first haunted house and is currently the longest running in the nation.

Haunted houses quickly spread across the country via charity fundraisers conducted by The United States Junior Chamber ("the Jaycees") and others. The Jaycees encouraged its membership to construct haunted houses in abandoned buildings or fields as charity fundraising events, and the organization became known for these houses throughout America. In the late 1960s to early 1970s, haunted attractions were developed in larger American cities like Louisville, Kentucky, and Cincinnati, Ohio, with the creation of Jaycees haunted houses. These haunted houses are run by local chapters of the Jaycees. There are still many local chapter Jaycees haunted houses in towns such as Lombard, Illinois; Foxborough, Massachusetts; Raleigh, North Carolina; Sheboygan, Wisconsin;and Columbia, South Carolina. The former Huntington Jaycees Haunted House, now known as the Haunted Hotel-13th Floor, was operated by volunteers in October 1963. The first verifiable Jaycees haunted attraction as recognized by the Jaycees national office was The WSAI Haunted House in Cincinnati, Ohio, operated by the Sycamore-Deer Park Jaycees in 1970. In 1974, The Haunted Schoolhouse, located in Akron, Ohio, opened to the public and is still in operation to this day.

The March of Dimes copyrighted a "Mini haunted house for the March of Dimes" in 1976 and began fundraising through their local chapters by conducting haunted houses soon after. Although they apparently quit supporting this type of event nationally sometime in the 1980s, some MoD haunted houses have persisted until today. This includes the Spooky Acres Haunted House in Norfolk, Virginia. Others open during this period include one in Indio, California, in 1976, one in Salt Lake City, Utah, in 1989, and one in Honolulu, Hawaii, in 1997. MoD Haunted Houses continuing much beyond the late 1980s would be considered outliers.

The beginning of the end for the charity haunts can be traced to a singular event: the Haunted Castle at Six Flags Great Adventure caught fire on the evening of May 11, 1984, in Jackson Township, New Jersey. Eight teenagers lost their lives in the fire. There were criminal charges filed, civil lawsuits, numerous investigations, and the inevitable result that fire safety laws, building codes, and inspections were tightened up considerably nationwide. The net effect was to make charity attractions less economically viable than they were before. Better construction materials were required, and fire safety equipment was required, making a temporary venue too expensive for many charities to afford. As a result, the larger, better funded for-profit operators moved in as the charities moved out. The fire caused wide-ranging changes for all amusement buildings. Previously, operators were able to avoid fire codes because such attractions were used temporarily. The Haunted Castle fire pointed to an unattractive reality that forced tighter regulation.

Professional haunted houses began to show up in the United States about the same time as the non-profits. However, subsequent to the Haunted Castle fire, many existing haunted attractions were shut down, as politicians and regulators enacted stronger safety codes. Volunteer (non-profit) organizations struggled to compete against the new for-profit competition under the tougher rules. Many were forced out of business either from the added competition or the inability to fund safety requirements. "The Jaycees got pushed out because their haunted houses were fairly basic." Currently, in the United States alone, there are over 4,000 October seasonal haunted houses and 300 theme parks that operate horror-themed events. Over 3,000 haunts are charity-run fundraisers.

In order to increase off-season attendance, theme parks entered the business seriously in the late 1980s and early 1990s. Six Flags launched Fright Fest in 1986-1989 and Universal Studios began Halloween Horror Nights in 1991. Although Knotts Berry Farm launched their Knott's Scary Farm in 1973, given America's obsession with Halloween as a cultural event surging in the 1990s, Knotts saw their attraction take off. Theme parks have played a major role in globalizing the holiday. Universal Studios Singapore and Universal Studios Japan both participate, while Disney now mounts Mickey's Not-So-Scary Halloween events at its parks in Paris, Hong Kong and Tokyo, as well as in the United States. The theme park haunts are by far the largest, both in scale and attendance.

== Types of haunted attractions ==
There are many types of haunted attractions including Scream Parks. The following categories are generalizations; many "haunts" contain attributes from more than one type.

=== Haunted house, mansion or castle ===
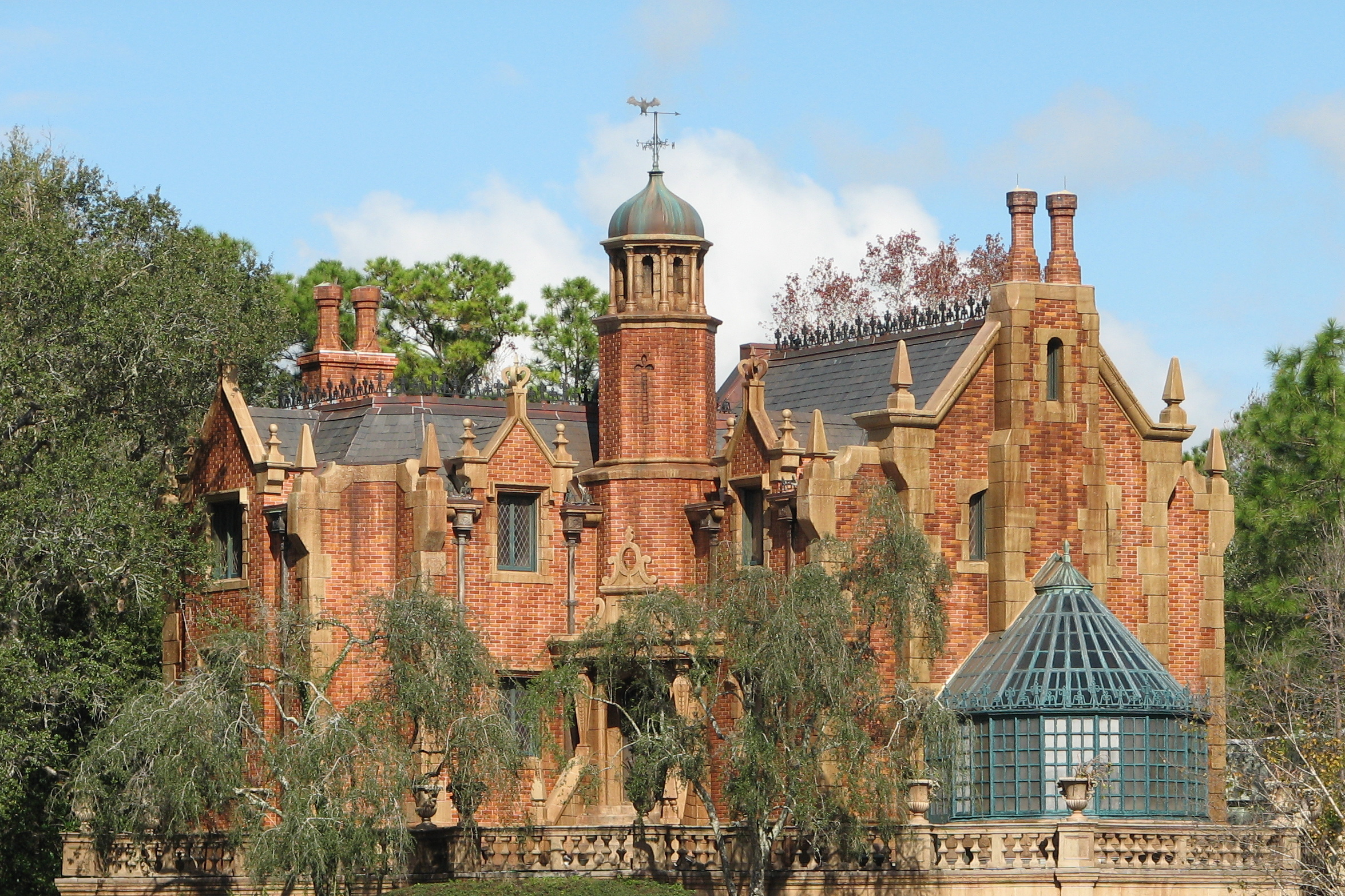
The Haunted Mansion at Walt Disney World's Magic Kingdom in Florida

A haunted house, haunted mansion, or haunted castle is a type of haunted attraction that usually takes place indoors. Visitors may experience intense animatronics, bloody and frightening set pieces, rustic antiques, scary music and sounds, dynamic lighting, fog, costumed actors with elaborate makeup or masks, and other special effects used to create scenes of terror.

Knoebels Amusement Resort in Elysburg, Pennsylvania, has a "Haunted House" dark ride. The Haunted Mansion is popular with patrons at Disney locations around the world. Miracle Strip Amusement Park in Panama City Beach, Florida, had a "Haunted Castle" ride until the amusement park itself closed down in 2004. Its prop elements became part of "The Terrortorium" in Oxford, Alabama, for annual Halloween events. Miracle Strip's former "Old House" walk-through attraction permanently transferred to Panama City Beach's amusement park, Race City, where it currently stands simply identified as "Haunted House". Many of Sally Corporation's Scooby-Doo's Haunted Mansion rides were replaced by Boo Blasters on Boo Hill.

Haunted houses or mansions for an annual Halloween season can be located in hospitals, grocery stores, shopping malls, warehouses, semi-trailers, factories, boats or ships, dilapidated homes, etc. Haunted house or haunted mansion events can range from a few minutes to many hours in length, with some permitting visitors to go at their own pace and others requiring group tours led by guides.

A number of the largest seasonal attractions feature multiple haunted houses on the same site. For example, in 2015, Pure Terror Screampark in Monroe, New York, was awarded the Guinness World Record for World's Longest Walk Through Horror Attraction.

In terms of appearance, the prototypical haunted house in America can probably trace its roots to the 1925 painting House by the Railroad by Edward Hopper.

=== Haunted trail or forest ===
A haunted trail or haunted forest is a type of attraction that takes place outside in the woods, at a park, at a theme park or other outside venue. Most haunted trails are close to a mile long and may include small buildings or huts that include various scenes visitors are forced to enter or walk past. The majority of haunted trails have lit paths or roped-off areas if there are no paths in the woods that have already been made. Haunted trails include various rooms or scenes such as hillbilly huts, a haunted cornfield, a clown maze, an alien invasion, or movie-themed rooms.

Haunted trails may use tour guides, or they may allow visitors to walk alone. Unlike haunted houses, weather determines if the attraction will be open or not during the month of October. Tour times may vary greatly depending on the customer's pace and the length of the trail.

=== Haunted hayride ===
A haunted hayride is a haunted attraction and a form of agri-entertainment that takes place during a hayride on a farm, park or large piece of land. Patrons climb on a wagon filled with hay or hay bales and are driven into the darkness as the tractor driver navigates through brush, cornfields, narrow paths, fields and barns. Throughout the trip, customers may come in contact with out-of-control farm equipment, fast-moving vehicles (hearses, hot rods), actors dressed up as monsters and traditional characters like the Headless Horseman from Washington Irving's The Legend of Sleepy Hollow.

The typical haunted hayride lasts from 10 to 45 minutes. Some use sound systems attached to the wagon or tractor. During the daytime, some haunted hayrides may have live shows, face painting, fun characters and may even sell pumpkins or other vegetables grown on the farm.

Haunted hayrides may be intertwined with any other type of haunted attraction, such as first being transported to the location with things to see along the way, before the guests are let off to walk through the rest of the attraction.

One of the more noted companies in this sector is Ten Thirty One Productions, which has hay rides in Los Angeles and New York. The haunted hayride was arguably started and popularized by the original Spooky World, which opened in Berlin, Massachusetts, in 1991.

=== Haunted ship ===
A haunted ship is a haunted attraction that takes place on a ship, battleship, destroyer, or any other type of ship. Patrons board these attractions via a gangway and walk through the ship that is usually lit with effects lighting, plays sound effects, and has thematic rooms meant to create a terrifying environment. Most of these types of attractions are found on the west coast or east coast of the US, and are not as prevalent as typical haunted theme parks, hayrides, and haunted trails or forests.

Some of the more popular haunted ships in the United States are the USS Nightmare in Newport, Kentucky; Queen Mary's Dark Harbor in Long Beach, California; and Ghost Ship Harbor in Quincy, Massachusetts.

=== Haunted theme park (screampark) ===
A haunted theme park is an amusement park whose buildings and paths have been converted into haunted houses, haunted trails or hayrides during the fall season (September, October and early November). Many haunted theme parks include themed outdoor scare zones that feature costumed monsters who roam around scaring customers. It is not unusual to come in contact with actors known as sliders who wear special kneepads. When the actor slides on the ground, the kneepads make a scraping noise before the actor is inches away from the customer.

Additionally, a large percentage of haunted theme parks feature live shows, concession areas, rides and other typical amusement park attractions. Not all haunted theme parks take place inside an actual amusement park. There are quite a few events that include multiple attractions in one place and may be located on a farm, park, parking lot or anywhere suitable for a large-scale event, but strictly speaking, these are not considered theme parks.

The first haunted theme park was Knott's Scary Farm, which opened at Knott's Berry Farm in Buena Park, California, on October 31, 1973. Haunted theme parks are among the most popular haunted attractions since they offer multiple attractions for a single admission price, and are often of a high level of production value.

Haunted theme parks, whether they are set in true theme parks or set up within large spaces, typically contain a certain two types of area for their facilities, the hub area where food, drinks and merchandise can be purchased, the guests can relax and the live shows such as bands and magic shows are performed, actors can still appear throughout the hub area, where their scare factor may or may not be as high compared to the mazes themselves. The mazes themselves are typically accessed by large queue entrances, and the mazes for the most part contain the bulk of a haunted theme park's scare factor, encouraging the more elaborate special effects, scare tactics and traversal compared to the calmer hub area.

=== Dark maze and chain maze ===
A dark maze (or pitch-black maze) is a haunted attraction that consists of dark or pitch-black rooms with multiple paths that may contain dead ends. Some may feature actors, air cannons, loud sounds, sprays of water, moving walls or floors, hanging props, flashing lights and more. A dark maze can be a standalone attraction or an extension of a haunted house, haunted trail or hayride.

Some dark mazes can transition into a chain maze, which is similar to a dark maze but uses metal bars or chain-link fencing for its walls. Most chain mazes will utilize strobe lights and heavy fog to blind and disorient customers while they try to find the exit. A chain maze can also serve as a standalone attraction.

The amount of time spent inside a dark maze or chain maze may depend on the construction of the maze as well as one's skill at navigating mazes.

Pitch black areas such as dark mazes are quite common as sections for horror attractions, and are quite common in extreme haunted houses, they usually contain ropes for traversal and if a guest is going the wrong way or lost, an actor within the room may hold the guests arm to guide them to the rope in order to find the way out of the dark area.

=== Hell house ===
In a hell house in the U.S., actors do stage combat during a scene about potentially-serious moral choices (video)

Hell houses are haunted attractions typically run by Christian churches or parachurch groups. These depict sin, the torments of the damned in Hell, and usually conclude with a depiction of heaven. They are most typically operated in the days preceding the triduum of Allhallowtide.

A hell house, like a conventional haunted-house attraction, is a space set aside for actors to frighten patrons with gruesome exhibits and scenes, presented as a series of short vignettes with a narrated guide. Unlike haunted houses, hell houses focus on occasions and effects of sin or the fate of unrepentant sinners in the afterlife.

The exhibits at a hell house often have a controversial tone focusing on issues of concern to Christians in the United States. Hell houses frequently feature exhibits depicting sin and its consequences. Common examples include abortion, suicide, use of alcoholic beverages and recreational drugs, adultery, occultism, and Satanic ritual abuse. Hell houses typically emphasize the belief that anyone who does not repent of their sin and accept Christ as their personal savior is condemned to Hell.

One of the first hell houses is Scaremare (still presented each October) in Lynchburg, Virginia; it was created by Jerry Falwell in the late 1970s. Similar events began in several regions during that period. Hell houses have faced criticism for advertising themselves as traditional haunted houses. Most involve biblical lessons and some ask customers to pray to Jesus Christ before exiting, regardless of their beliefs. Some hell houses are much more graphic than traditional haunted attractions and not appropriate for all audiences.

=== Dark ride ===
A dark ride or ghost train (United Kingdom and Australia) is an indoor amusement ride where riders in guided vehicles travel through specially-lit scenes that typically contain animatronics, sound, music, and special effects.

A dark ride is enclosed so all illumination is controlled, often using theatrical lighting to achieve special effects. Selective use of darkness helps hide ride mechanisms and increase visual drama. The Twilight Zone Tower of Terror is a popular dark ride at Walt Disney World's Hollywood Studios (Sunset Boulevard), Tokyo DisneySea (American Waterfront), and Walt Disney Studios Park (Production Courtyard).

Revenge of the Mummy roller coaster is the most popular dark ride at Universal Studios Florida (New York City), Universal Studios Hollywood (Lower Lot), and Universal Studios Singapore (Ancient Egypt).

=== Haunted cornfield maze ===
A cornfield maze is an attraction that uses cornstalks to form paths for people to walk through. Patrons can expect to experience turns, straight paths and dead ends. The cornfield maze might be designed to resemble a popular character, public figure, event or holiday. Most cornfield mazes are open during the day and are appropriate for all ages.

The largest corn maze in the world was located in Dixon, California, and is 45 acres in area as of 2010. Although this corn maze holds distinction as the world's largest corn maze, Adventure Acres corn maze in Bellbrook, Ohio, consists of 62 acres of corn maze with 8.5 miles of trails. In 2003, a world record for the longest maze path, as recognised by Guinness World Records, was set on 10 July 2003 at 8.838 miles (14.223 kilometres) in the Lobster Maize Maze, designed by Adrian Fisher, at Stewarts Gardenlands, Christchurch, Dorset, England.

A haunted cornfield maze is identical to a cornfield maze except that it may include actors, props, special effects, scary music and more. The majority of haunted cornfield mazes are open after dark.

=== Home and yard haunts ===
A home haunt is a simplified version of a haunted attraction that is created at a person's home. They often begin with a yard haunt (see below) before continuing into interior rooms, which may include garages. Visitors can expect to see homemade props or animatronics, detailed decor, special effects and costumed characters. The vast majority of home haunts are not for profit, or may ask for donations for charity or other local causes. They are usually open for a few hours on Halloween night, or for a few weekends in October. They do not require state-issued emergency lighting, fire alarms, or fire escapes if they are under a specific length.

Yard haunts take place in a yard, usually dressed to resemble a cemetery, adjacent to a home. They may feature prop tombstones, skulls, large inflatable characters, plastic light-up figures (a.k.a. blowmolds), strobe lights, fog machines, cobwebs, spooky music, animatronics, and other décor that can be purchased at Halloween stores. Some homeowners create their own props. Displays can include synchronized music and lighting effects using computer programs such as Light-O-Rama or Animated Lighting. They may utilize an FM transmitter so people can park their car, locate a low-frequency radio station, and watch and listen to the show without the sounds disturbing the neighbors. An example of this type attraction is The House at Haunted Hill in Woodland Hills, California.

=== Ghost run ===
A ghost run is a haunted event that takes place in a person's car. When a customer purchases a ticket for a ghost run, they are given various clues as to where different haunted attractions are. This haunted scavenger hunt usually includes a few local haunted attractions and other free items. At the end of the ghost run's season, the winner with the best mileage locating the haunts is revealed and they are given a prize.

=== Midnight ghost (or spook) shows ===
Between the 1930s–1960s, movie theaters would have live shows that featured magicians performing magic tricks, séances, special effects and scary skits. This was at a time when people were unaware of how these seemingly incredible tricks were done and it was a relatively new form of entertainment before the spread of the haunted attraction. Many of these spook shows doubled with horror movies and played at smaller movie theaters during the Halloween season or different parts of the year. Eventually these shows would incorporate bloody special effects and sometimes be referred to as Midnight Horror Shows. These shows were daring for their time, but would phase out by the end of the 1960s. A modern interpretation of the classic spook show was the Hauntings Ghost Show in Gatlinburg, Tennessee. This attraction was themed as a Victorian Seance, which took place in a small theater setting. During the show, the audience would encounter automated gags instead of live performers. The attraction was in operation from the early 1980s until September 2015.

=== Extreme haunted houses ===
As the haunted attraction industry has evolved, it has trended toward ever more elaborate settings, more sophisticated technology, more elaborate backstories and so-called "extreme" haunted houses. Most operators, from the mega-haunts down to local charity events have felt the competitive pressure to improve their events. Higher quality scenery and props and ever more elaborate concepts and writing have become the norm. Furthermore, the experiences have expanded in terms of sheer size, either by making the mazes longer, or by providing more than one attraction on the same site.

Some operators have tried to distinguish themselves by adding more extreme experiences. The most common upgrades beyond those cited above include blackout houses, interactive houses, and the inclusion of virtual reality, laser tag elements, or both.

Blackout houses are pitch-black mazes which the guests must feel their way through. This may involve crawling, and, sometimes, contact by the actors. This is usually not allowed in less extreme houses, and may require the guest to sign a waiver prior to entering.

Interactive houses may involve the guests being closed into an "escape room", where they have a time limit to try to figure out how to escape, and physical clues scattered around the space. There are scares also hidden in the space, and often guest escape efforts have consequences for wrong guesses.

VR and laser tag houses add an element of the first-person shooter video game experience to the guest's journey through the house.

The most extreme houses may feature full contact with the guests and include a chance that the guest may be subjected to mild torture, including simulated drowning, simulated assault, and light electric shock. Guests are often given a safeword for anyone who might not be able to complete the experience. Tennessee's McKamey Manor requires both an application process and a waiver. Unlike most of its rivals, there was no safeword until 2017. The tour, which is free, can take up to four hours to complete. In that time, guests have been tied and gagged, forced into coffins and freezers, and had their heads pushed into cages full of snakes. People have even been known to leave with scratches and bruises. Another example is Blackout, which has versions in Los Angeles, Chicago, Miami, and New York, and has been rated on several lists as the most extreme haunted house in the world. Additional extreme haunts include Heretic and Hvrting in Los Angeles, Miasma in Chicago, Shock Theater in New York, and Faceless Ventures in the UK.

The Naked and Scared Challenge was an adults-only experience at Shocktoberfest, a 27-acre fear park located in Sinking Spring, Pennsylvania. Visitors at least 18 years old were invited to disrobe before entering. After choosing the "nude" or "prude" (underwear-only) option, guests were asked to sign waivers prior to a clothes-free fright. The nude option was cancelled prior to opening, due to pressure from local authorities. There have been a few such houses around the country, but they have apparently not caught on. This event began during the 2013 season, and was still running as of 2017, as the Almost Naked and Scared Challenge.

A haunted experience is a relatively new type of haunted attraction that combines the concept of a haunted house with something like a scavenger hunt. These begin in one place and end in another, usually the haunted house itself. An example of a haunted experience is Nyctophobia on Long Island, New York; in 2010, ticket buyers were given a location that was not the physical haunted house, but a pick-up spot where they got into a van blindfolded and were driven to the real location. Other experiences such as Blackout have the participants sign liability waivers and feature scenes where the performers can physically touch the guests and perform actions that resemble various acts such as waterboarding.

== Business environment ==
Haunted attractions can be categorized as follows: mega-haunt, professional haunt, charity haunt and home haunt. The mega-haunts would include the large theme park operators such as Universal Studios Halloween Horror Nights, Six Flags Fright Fest, and Walt Disney's Haunted Mansion. These largest operators are not members of any of the haunt trade groups, and are ignored by them in terms of reviews and awards. This mega-group also avoids publishing attendance or revenue figures.

The professional American haunt industry is a multibillion-dollar business with nearly 2,000 haunts open each year and over 12,000,000 customers attending those attractions. Throughout the year, there are many conventions held all over the United States. These include Midwest Haunters Convention (Ohio), National Haunters Convention (Pennsylvania), Haunted Attraction National Trade-show and Conference (HAuNTcon; moves to a new city each year), Indy Haunt Fest (Indiana), West Coast Haunters Convention (Oregon), Canadian Haunters Convention (Canada), Halloween & Attractions Show (Missouri), and many others. These annual conventions feature props, seminars, workshops, parties, and haunt tours. The biggest show of the year is the Transworld Halloween and Haunted Attraction show in St Louis, Missouri, each March drawing over 8000 buyers with over 100,000 square feet of vendors.

The haunt industry's first association, the International Association of Haunted Attractions (IAHA), started in 1998. The second was the Haunted House Association in 2008. In late 2010, both associations agreed to merge and form the Haunted Attraction Association. Other related groups are the Haunt Reviewers Association (HRA), Home Haunters Association, and the Halloween and Haunt Vendors Association (HHVA) and Haunted Attraction Association.

Many haunted attractions across the United States now feature higher quality animatronics and effects than in the past. because of technological advancement, towering monsters, movie-quality CGI, dynamic lighting, props that interact with customers, scent dispensers, intricate set pieces and figures, pneumatic props, or props that spray water or air are more common as of 2026.

Attractions are covered by industry trade magazines including Hauntworld Magazine, Haunted Attraction Magazine, and Fangoria. The industry has also been featured by television networks, and attractions are ranked by a variety of special-interest web sites.

As of 2013, one source estimated there were more than 2,500 haunted attractions worldwide, most in the United States. It is estimated to be an 8.4 billion dollar industry in America alone in 2016, according to the National Retail Federation. This is up from estimated Halloween spending in the United States in 2011 at $6.8 billion, which itself was up from $3.3 billion in 2005. This growth shows few signs of slowing. "In the past two decades, haunted houses have become a booming national industry that generates hundreds of millions of dollars and includes family-friendly theme parks, huge high-tech productions and evangelical Christian hell houses."

== Legal and safety environment ==
Safety requirements generally include fire suppression systems, clearly marked exits, warning signs, and panic systems. Warning signs usually warn customers about heavy fog, intense strobes, loud sounds and music, crawling, and stress that people who are pregnant, disabled, have a heart condition or prone to epileptic seizures should not enter. Most attractions must be inspected by local authorities to confirm that they comply with building and fire codes.

== International perspective ==
While many cultures have Halloween and Halloween-like traditions, many of which have been absorbed by Americans, physical locations where simulated haunted attractions are created seem to have been a uniquely American invention. The American Haunted attraction has recently begun to be exported elsewhere, from the early 2000s, with theme parks playing a major role in globalizing the holiday as they often have an international presence. The clearest examples are Universal Studios, which has exported its Halloween Horror Nights to its parks in Singapore (2011) and Japan (2012), and Six Flags, which has begun celebrating its Fright Fest at its locations in Mexico and Canada. Disney now mounts Mickey's Not-So-Scary Halloween events at its parks in Paris, Hong Kong and Tokyo, as well as the United States. Overseas operators of themed attractions have also followed the American trend. Examples include: Fright Nights at Thorpe Park Surrey, England, Scarefest at Alton Towers Staffordshire, England and Fright Nights at Warner Bros Movie World in Queensland, Australia.

== See also ==
- Escape room
- Freak show
- Funhouse
- List of haunted attractions
