= History of Knott's Berry Farm =

The Knott's Berry Farm amusement park in Orange County, California originated from a berry farm owned by Walter Knott (1889–1981). In the 1920s, Knott and his wife, Cordelia, sold berries, berry preserves and pies from a roadside stand beside State Route 39, near the small town of Buena Park. In 1932, on a visit to Rudolph Boysen's farm in nearby Anaheim, Walter Knott was introduced to a new hybrid berry of a blackberry, a red raspberry, and a loganberry cross-bred by Boysen, who gave Walter his last six wilted berry-hybrid plants. Walter planted and cultivated them, then the family sold the berries at their roadside stand. When people asked what kind they were, he called them "Boysenberries".

In 1934, to make ends meet during the Great Depression, Knott's wife Cordelia (1890–1974) began serving fried chicken dinners on their wedding china. For dessert, Knott's signature Boysenberry pie was also served to guests dining in the small tea room. As Southern California developed, Highway 39 became the major north-south connection between Los Angeles County and the beaches of Orange County, and the restaurant's location was a popular stopping point for drivers making the two-hour trip in those days before freeways. Until Interstate 605 and State Route 57 were built in the late 1960s, Highway 39 (now known in Orange County as Beach Boulevard) continued to carry the bulk of the traffic between eastern Los Angeles and Orange County. Great location and good value were the restaurant's conditions of success which attracted long lines of diners.

== Amusements ==
As time went on, more shops and interactive displays were opened to entertain patrons waiting for a seat at the Mrs. Knott's Chicken Dinner Restaurant. The Berry Market expanded South from Mrs. Knott's Chicken Dinner Restaurant along Grand Avenue with the addition of wishing wells, rock gardens with miniature waterfalls, water wheels and a grindstone "Down by the Old Mill Stream", near a replica of George Washington's Mount Vernon fireplace which the Knotts had seen while on vacation and admired it so much that they replicated it behind Jams & Jellies; Lost and Found, Nursery, Preserving Kitchen and Administration Offices. Before long, the Knotts had added Virginia's Gift Shop and several more shops and attractions such as a 15-million-year-old petrified log, a thirteen-foot diameter cross section of coastal redwood cut at age 750 years, a visible bee-hive and an oxcart, with several wagons provided additional photo opportunities. The entire operation would soon be renamed Knott's Berry Place.

=== Active Volcano ===
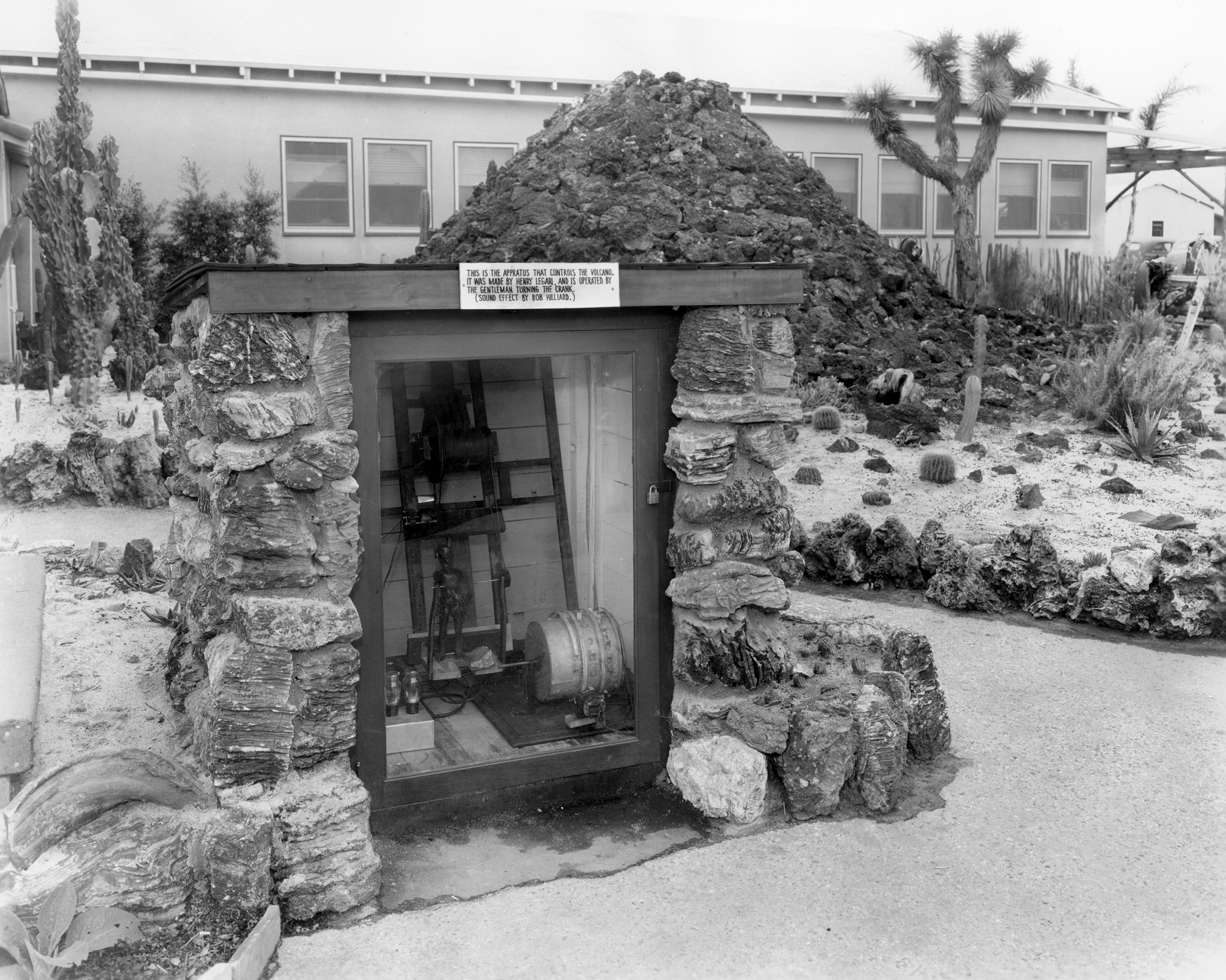
The rock volcano at Knott's with the apparatus shed. It was operated by turning the crank in the foreground, built by Henry Legano

Walt built a 12-foot-tall volcano of lava rock trucked in from the Pisgah Crater in the Mojave Desert and equipped it with a boiler that rumbled, hissed, and spit steam at the push of a button. Two signs posted nearby read: "Danger, keep out" and "Only active volcano in Southern California moved in from the Mojave Desert complete—and has been erupting faithfully ever since."

"It's not half as fool a thing as it seems," Knott told Farm Journal. "When the customers pile up so we can't seat them, the girls send them out to ... play with the volcano. They get so interested that I've had to install a loud speaker system to call them to their meals when the tables are ready." The volcano cost $600, and Knott figured it paid for itself the first month. At some point in the late '50s or early '60s, a fanciful mechanical contraption displayed within a 2'x2' box replaced the manual push button. A small red devil with fiery wings cranked a chain behind the glass driving a larger black drum fitted with bent sheet metal acting as cams around its edge, several turns of the demon would cause the cams to strike switches and the active volcano would illuminate, rumble, hiss and/or steam – simulating vulcan activity. The caption sign above the enclosure read "This is the apparatus that controls the volcano. It was made by Henry Legano, and is operated by the gentleman turning the crank. (Sound effect by Bob Halliard.)". The volcano became the "Cornerstone" for a real gold mine, both figuratively and literally.

The most popular genre of motion picture at the time was 'The Western,' and western theming was quick and easy to make: slap some concrete over chicken wire and carve it into rockwork before it sets, known today as shotcrete. This construction technique became the basis for fabricating much of what was to become Knott's – from stairways to mountains and tunnels, even the drinking fountains shaped like tree-stumps. Using techniques like those on the Watts Towers one could set decoration in it, like the sheet of quartz containing a dark sandy vein indicating gold – as was the entrance to the gold mine/pan for gold.

=== Gold Mine ===
From the West side of the volcano, guests could enter a mine shaft following a vein of gold down into a large open pit and the Pan-for-Gold activity where customers could buy a ticket to pan for real gold to take home in a vial. Nearby the gold mine shaft entrance, the prospectors mule would haul a stone around an Arrastra, a circular ore grinding pit, filled with gold bearing quartz to release its gold. (In 1998, the mine entrance was converted to the entrance for the Ghost Rider rollercoaster which descended from the station into the former Gold Mine pit. Pan-for-Gold was moved West to School House Road between Boot Hill and the Miner's Bank, but has since been moved back to the original location.)

=== Artist Studio ===
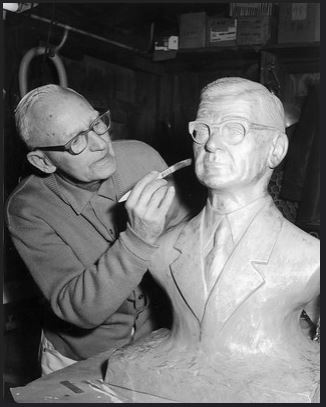
Claude Bell, sculpted this bust of Walter Knott, which is now in Independence Hall at Knott's, in 1967

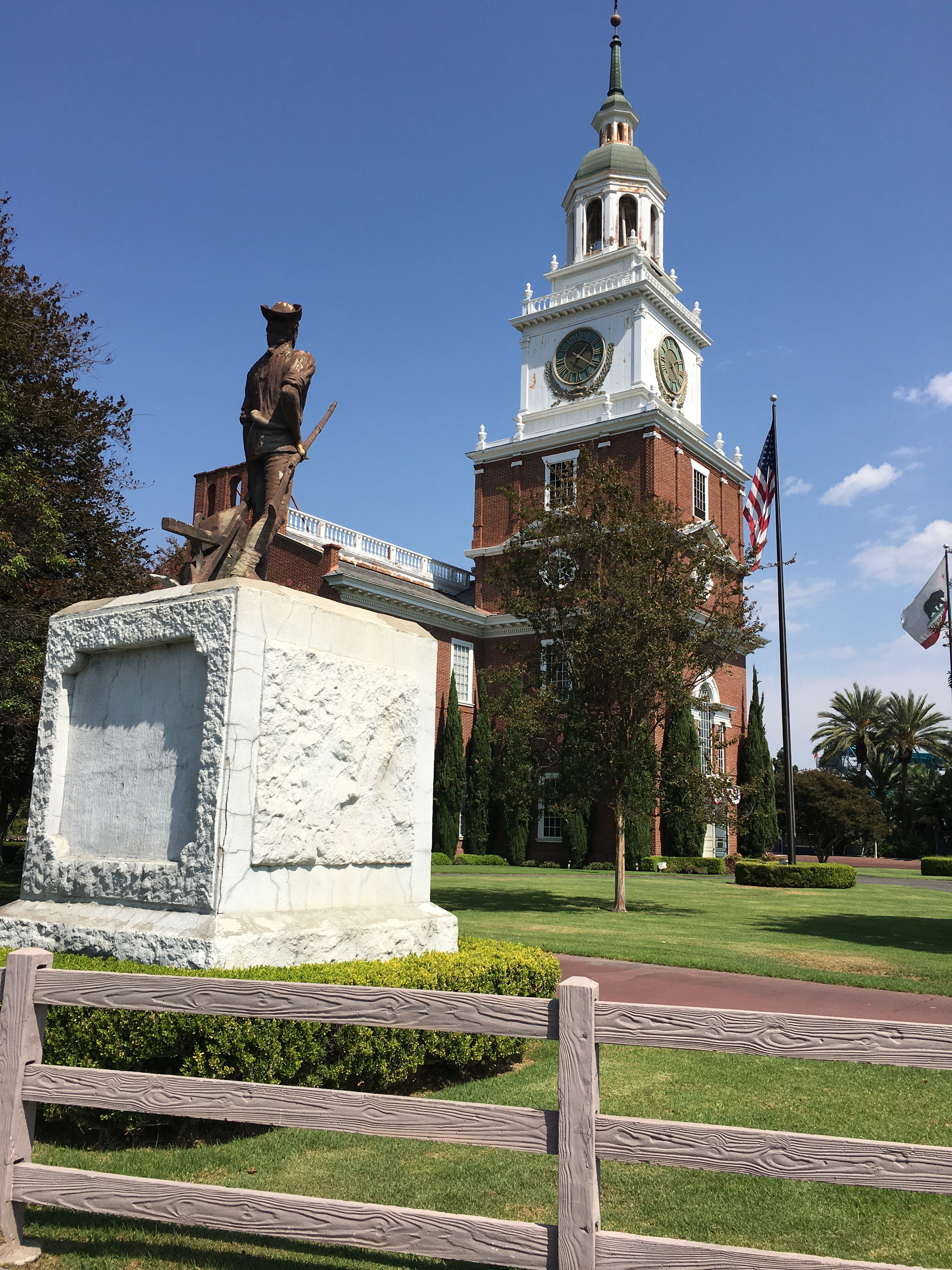
Claude Bell sculpted the minuteman statue which is at Independence Hall at Knott's. He also executed portraits of Walter and Cordelia Knott, which are in the chicken dinner restaurant, and created the concrete characters that are on benches in Ghost Town and the Roaring 20's areas.

The portrait artists at Knott's have a long history there. Claude Bell was a sculptor and artist at Knott's from 1947 through 1986. He created the well-known concrete figures sitting on benches, such as those that were modeled after Calico Saloon singer Cecelia Peterson and dancer Marilyn Schuler. Bell operated the Artist Studio, from 1951 to 1986. It continues to this day, with Kaman's Art Stoppes operating the concession. Artists execute portraits of guests in pastel in about 20 minutes. They can also work from printed photographs. The portrait artists are now at the north end of Camp Snoopy, near the Ferris wheel.

== Ghost Town ==
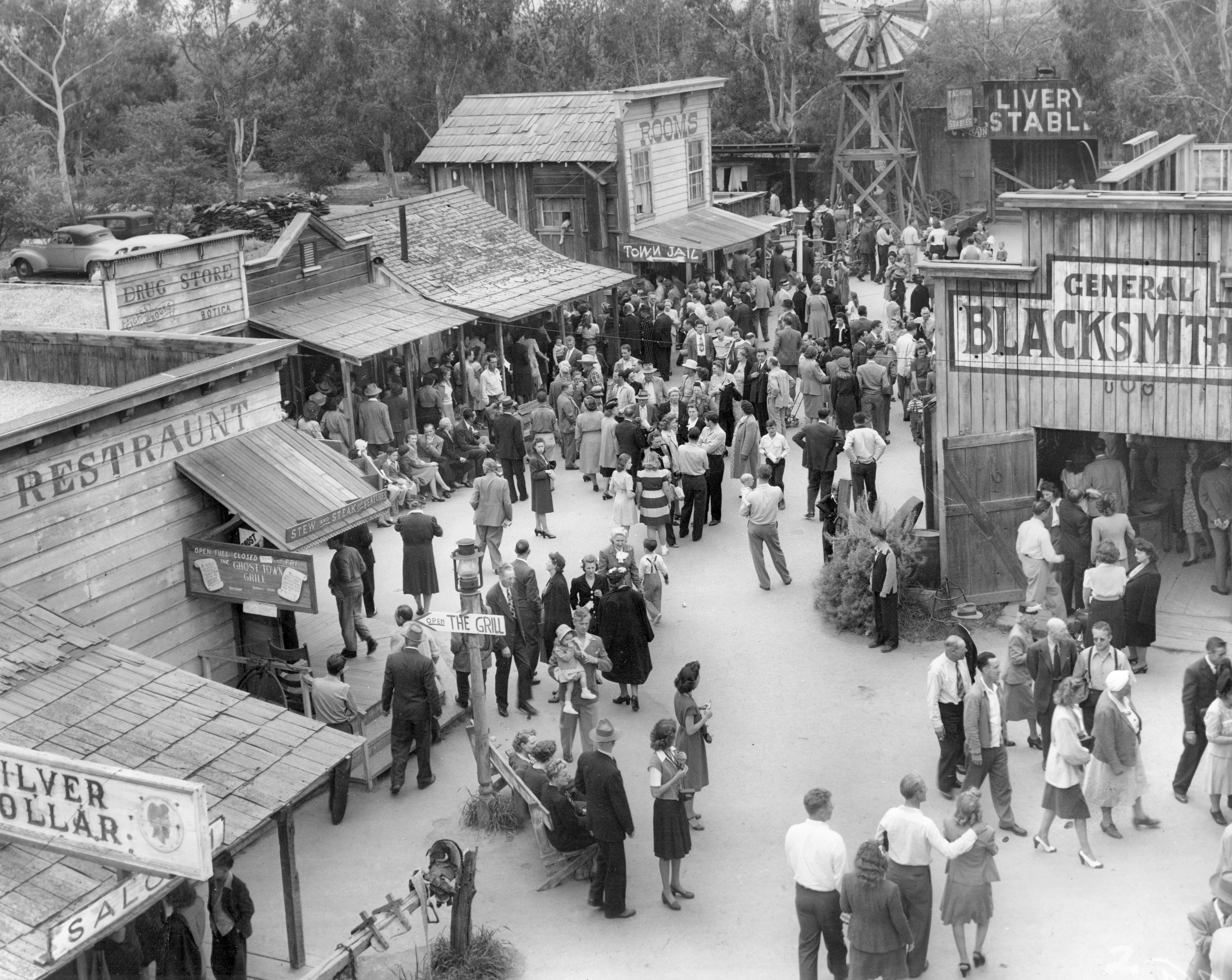
Ghost Town at Knott's Berry Farm in the 1940s.

Ghost Town is the original part of today's enclosed Knott's Berry Farm amusement park. It was built by Knott as his tribute to the pioneers, which included his own grandparents who came west on a wagon train, bringing with them their young daughter, who was Walter Knott's mother. Ghost Town includes most of the buildings he brought to the property or constructed in the 1940s and 1950s. Most of the buildings on Main Street were completed in late 1940 or early 1941. Most of the rest of Ghost Town was completed over the next decade and a half.

=== Paul von Klieben ===
In 1939, Walter Knott had engaged an artist to paint the mural for the cyclorama in the Gold Trails Hotel (see below) on a weekly salary. However, nearly a year went by with little progress, and then the artist quit. Knott hired Paul von Klieben, a well-known portrait artist, to take over. Von Klieben liked what Knott was trying to accomplish, and the two of them bonded quickly. Von Klieben finished the cyclorama in just a few weeks.

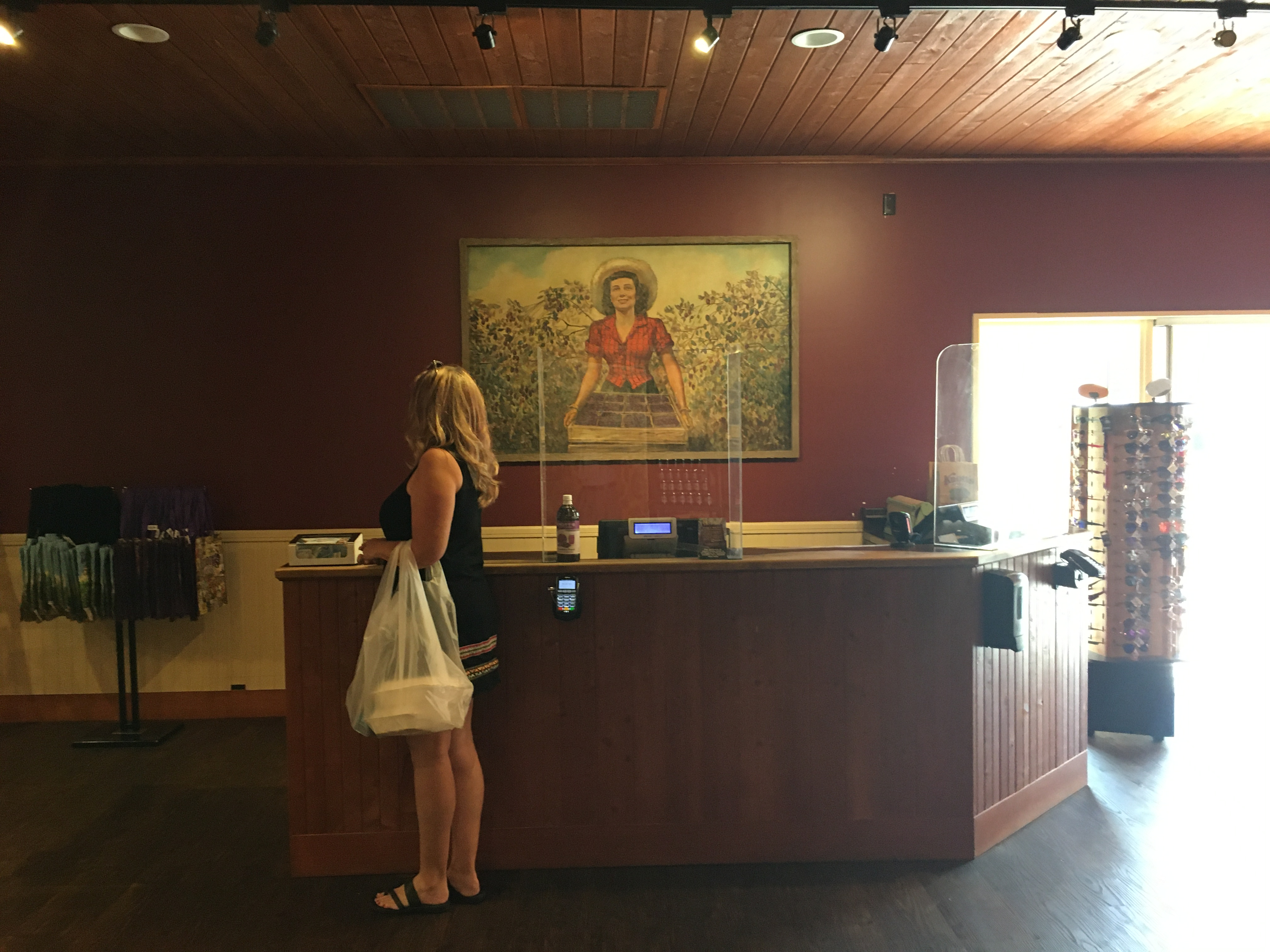
A portrait of Rachel Elizabeth "Toni" Knott executed by Paul von Klieben hangs in Virginia's Gift Shop at Knott's.

Knott then put him to work on the rest of Ghost Town, and it became one of the most productive relationships in Knott's history. Von Klieben planned most of Ghost Town, including producing concept art, floor plans and a three-dimensional model of the Steak House, as well as overseeing construction and the process for treating new lumber to make it look old. Von Klieben painted numerous portraits and landscapes, a number of which still hang in various buildings in Knott's Berry Farm. He was a very versatile artist, and even wielded a spray gun to paint concrete to look like rock in the Gold Mine area. When Walter Knott purchased the old ghost town of Calico, California in 1951, he put von Klieben in charge of restoring it.

=== Gold Trails Hotel ===
Little by little, Walt began building a ghost town in 1940, using buildings relocated from real old west towns such as Prescott, Arizona. Painted signs of Old Trails Hotel had a humorous scrawl of the letter 'G', as if to hastily change the name to Gold Trails Hotel. It was the first of many and re-built to house a salute to the hardship endured by early settlers.

Originally the entrance was through the open end of a Conestoga Wagon The canvas covering of the wagon entrance did not last long and was converted to a wooden extension of the hotel which effectively 'built-in' the wagon. The enclosed Conestoga Wagon showcased several artifacts relating to the pioneers who endured the hardship of traveling to California in covered wagons. Pioneers were welcomed to sign a '49er's guest book, while waiting for the free Covered Wagon Show, which was a cyclorama - a 20 by 50 foot mural depicting a wagon train crossing the desert, as well as three-dimensional displays in the foreground. It included a three-minute audio presentation in tribute to those hardy 1849 pioneers. Special lighting changed the daytime scene to night, with moon and stars. It ended with the voice of a little girl saying "Mommy, I want a drink of water!"

Along the south side of Main Street where the line of waiting diners wrapped around the building, he filled themed "shops" with relics set into a scene of whimsy. Starting at the corner of Gold Mine Road and Main Street, "Deadwood Dick's" grave marker showed that he died with his boots on, near Soldado José wood carving of a Mexican soldier. The playback in the Assayer's Office pits the owner attempting to discover, and jump, the claim location against the prospector yet to stake his claim. Hop Wing Lee the proprietor of the Chinese Laundry irons endlessly, singing western tunes in Mandarin. The Barber shaves One Eye Ike and contemplates his wanted poster hanging nearby. A piano player was hired to play outside the Silver Dollar Saloon where real cups of boysenberry drink could be purchased with snacks. The Sheriff's Office hosted a crooked poker game. To interest folks and entice them to the back of the line, Gold Dust Goldie's Hotel featured a live gentleman interested in a few details about your group about to visit Sad Eye Joe back in the Town Jail – to surprise them with personal comments. Goldie's leg in fishnet stocking and high-button shoe, covered with petticoats hung out of an upstairs window of Goldie's Place and would kick to thump the clapboarding, as if to advertise the brothel.

=== Pitchur Gallery ===
Reflecting humor in illiteracy, the establishment's name was intentionally misspelled "Pitchur Gallery". In 1940, Gus Thornrose set up shop behind the 'G'old trails hotel, with standees, a Western saloon bar-room scene, and even a stuffed bucking bronco posed in mid throw. Near the cuspidor (spittoon) was a sign which was captured in many souvenir photographs "Spit on ceiling, anyone can spit on the floor." Folks could select from a wide variety of costuming and stand for a pose, or choose to put their faces through holes of humorous standees such as lifting weights, prospector dancing with a can-can girl or sit behind painted oxen hauling a covered wagon to be captured with vintage wooden large format bellows cameras onto glass photographic plates. Digital capture has since replaced the labor-intensive development process. "You'll never know how good you look, until ya gits yer pitchur took."

=== Blacksmith ===
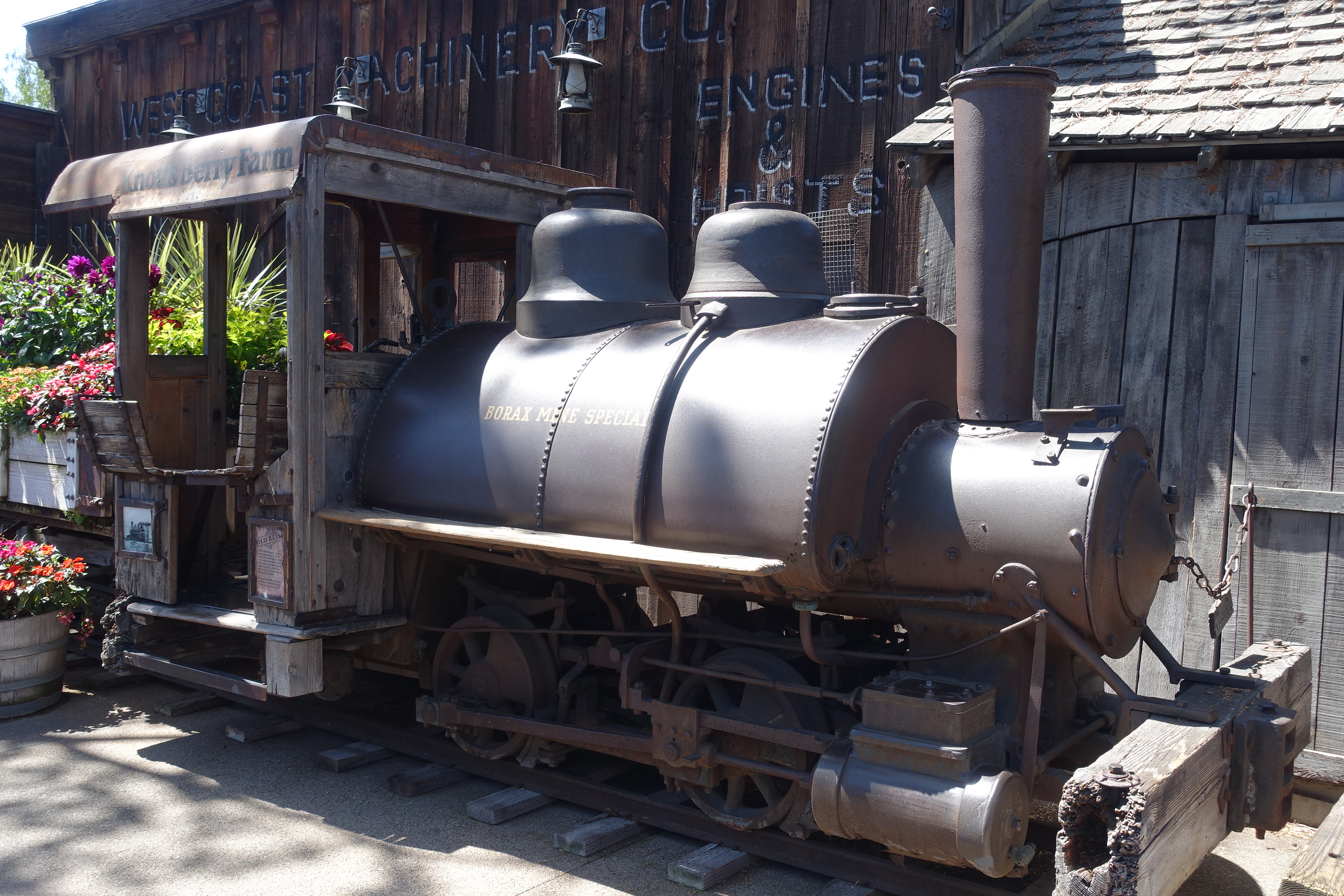
"Old Betsy," now in front of the Blacksmith Shop, once served the Westend Chemical Company at Westend (formerly Hanksite), California.

Along the north side of Main Street were benches on the boardwalk featuring photo opportunities with concrete figures of the grizzled prospectors Handsome Brady with Whiskey Jim (although the sign behind the bench called him Whisky Bill, a misprint) and the dancing girls Marilyn and Cecelia Hargrave, a popular hand pump, which recirculated water through a horse drinking trough, and "Old Betsy" a photo-opportunity of a small saddle-tank steam locomotive and borax train beside the blacksmith's shop. A blacksmith in a large leather apron would stoke the fire in the forge, then pound the red hot iron on an anvil to shape souvenir horseshoes. The blacksmith shop continues to be operated by a working blacksmith, and much of the ironwork seen in the park was commissioned to be fabricated there. Guests can have implements made such as custom fireplace pokers and branding irons.

=== Livery Stable ===
Walter re-built a Windmill water pump originally from England and used here on a ranch beside the Livery Stable housing a collection of wagons, coaches, and horse-drawn hearses. Walter did not think his collection of old buildings would get much bigger, so the stable was placed across "the end" of Main St. and the Dry Gulch Pack Train and stage coach ride planned for Stage Coach Road.

=== General Merchandise Store ===
The General Merchandise Store (1944) was designed by Paul von Klieben to be typical of the architecture of Gold Rush Days. It was originally stocked with old-time merchandise as well.

=== Bottle House and Music Hall ===
The Bottle House (1944 or early 1945) is similar to those in the ghost towns of Rhyolite, Nevada and Calico, California. Building materials were scarce, but empty liquor bottles were plentiful, so the result was a house made of bottles. The Music Hall (1945) housed a masterfully executed painting of a Native American family lit by firelight entitled "The Night Watch," by noted artist Charles Christian Nahl, that Walter Knott's art director, Paul von Klieben had urged him to purchase. Also included was a collection of ancient ornate musical instruments, coin-operated amusements, gambling devices, along with elaborate and rare music boxes from France, Switzerland, and Germany. The Swiss birdcages featuring whistling mechanical automaton birds were among the inspirations of Walt Disney to create Audio-Animatronics.

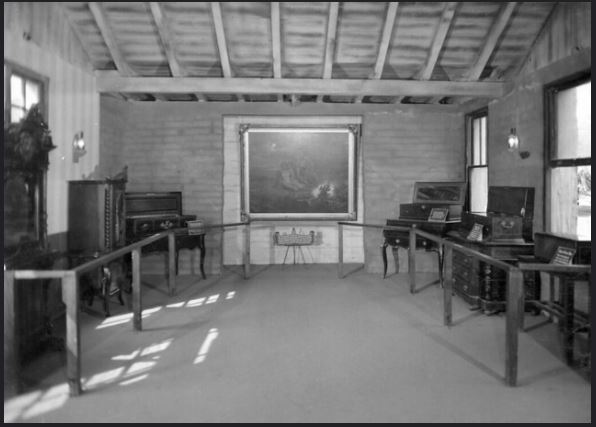
Nahl's painting, "Night Watch," was displayed for many years in the Music Hall, as shown in this photo. It was later donated by Knott descendants to the Orange County Museum of Art

=== Gun Shop ===
The Gun Shop (1946) was copied from a building in Angel's Camp, an old mining town in California's Mother Lode country. Typically mining towns, the early buildings were tents. These were followed by wooden buildings, and often followed by a disastrous fire that would sweep through the town. Following such fires, often fireproof structures would be built out of stone, brick or adobe. The Gun Shop represents such a structure. Its iron doors could be closed to further protect it from fire, or if need be, from flying bullets.

Inside the Gun Shop is an exhibit of machinery used in the manufacture of guns, including a boring machine and a rifling machine.

=== School House ===
The School House is an actual one-room school house (built in 1879), including the contents, that Walter Knott purchased at auction in Kansas (through a local agent). Knott had been looking for a one-room school house to buy. Nina Duden, a local teacher, who had come from Kansas, heard that this unused, boarded-up school house was to be sold at auction, and suggested he buy it. His agent in Kansas did not tell anyone who he was representing, but when he told them that it was to be preserved as a museum, the other bidders dropped out and let him have it for a couple hundred dollars. Knott had it dismantled, trucked to California and re-erected.

=== Old Maizeland School ===
There is a second school house in ghost town. The Old Maizeland School is located at the west end of Museum Lane. It was built in 1868 in what is today Pico Rivera, California, by James C. Shugg. In 1950, Walter Knott purchased the Maizeland School and installed it at his farm. The school was designated a California Historic Landmark (No.729) on April 8, 1960. As of 2026 it is used as reptiles, insects, and animal physiology museum called the Express Outpost.

=== Box House and Barrel House ===
These two structures, built out of old boxes and old barrels respectively (1953) were examples of miners building houses out of whatever materials were available. The Box House, which used to be to the south of the Miners' Bank and in front of the Barrel House, has been replaced by a new version of the Haunted Shack.

=== Covered Wagon Camp ===
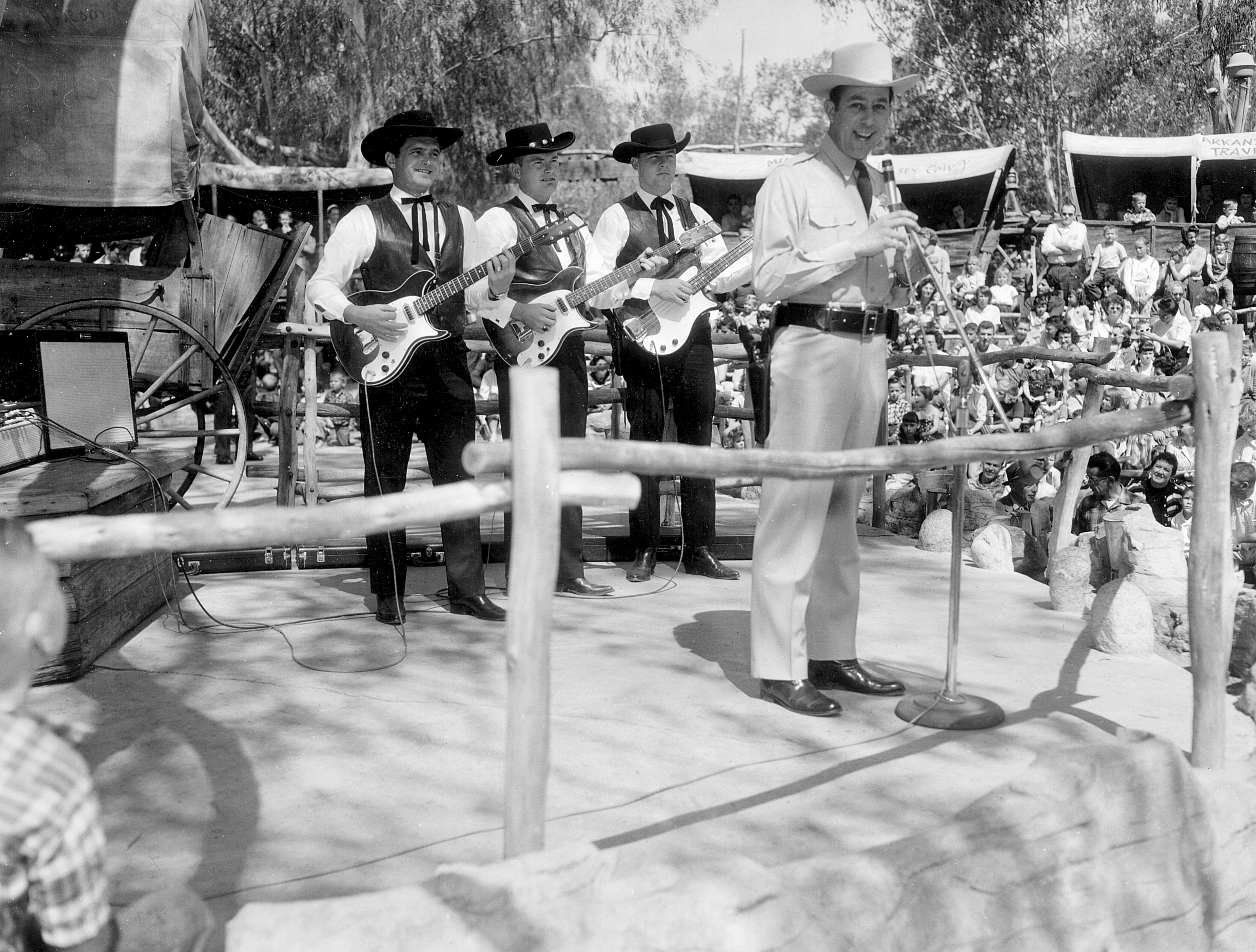
The Sheriff John entertains visitors to the Covered Wagon Camp in 1963.

With the success of the free entertainment, another western themed attraction was dug into a pit and terraced with concrete rockwork. Live performances of popular country and western bands and singers were featured, as guests gathered around a raging campfire, surrounded by a circle of Conestoga wagons, humorously painted with slogans such as "California, or bust" on the Prairie Schooner canvas. Part of that installation included Sutters, a fast food burger, hot dog, pizza, chili, fries, and drinks stand, served in a folding cardboard box as a box lunch for enjoyment in the Covered Wagon Camp, setting a precedent and long-standing tradition of enjoying a meal purchased at Knott's to be enjoyed anywhere.

Knott's Berry Farm transitioned from a way-point into a destination as word spread.

=== Mark Smith Horse Show ===
A wild west style horse show was in an open air bleacher stadium, where Calico Mine Ride is now. It was similar to the Buffalo Bill's Wild West Show.

=== Butterfield Stagecoach ===
The Butterfield Stagecoach Line left every few minutes from the Stage Depot in 1949. Well trained four-horse teams hauled historic equipment – three original Butterfield coaches, a Halloday coach, an Overland Southern coach, and the Knott's Berry Farm coach that was built for the farm in 1954. Guests enjoyed a stagecoach journey north to Whiskey Flat looping around the badlands filled with bad men.

=== Western Trails Museum ===
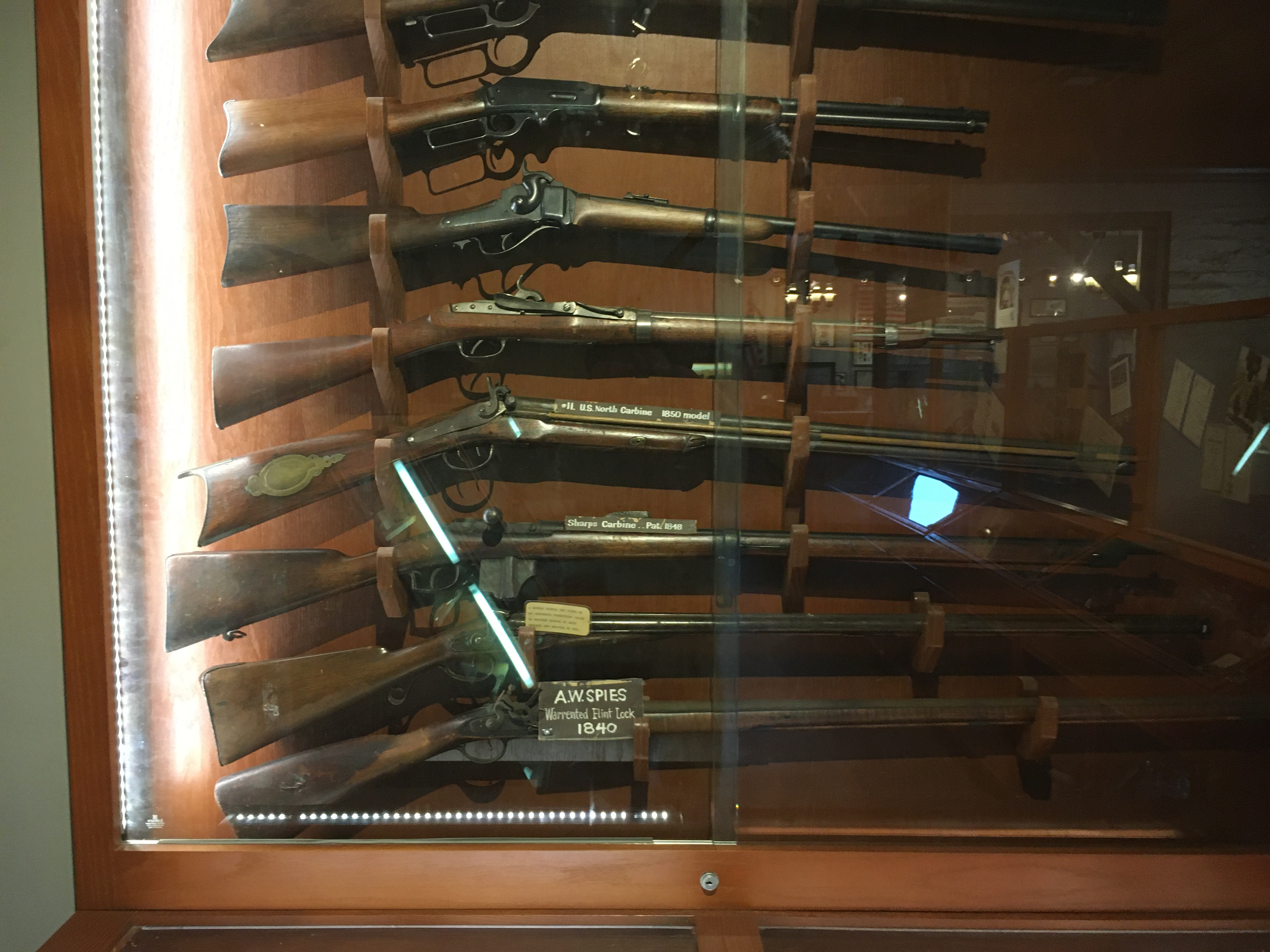
A sample of the guns on display at the Western Trails Museum. Many of the descriptive labels on objects in the museum (and other places at Knott's) were lettered by Ed "Big Daddy" Roth, who was known for creating the "Rat Fink" character.

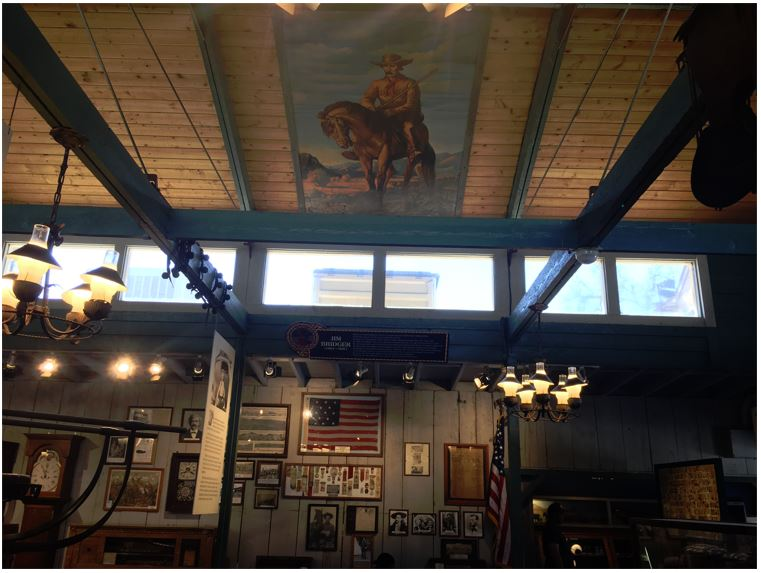
Center Room, Western Trails Museum, Knott's Berry Farm, 2021. A large portrait of Kit Carson by Paul von Klieben (who planned most of Ghost Town at Knott's) is on the ceiling.

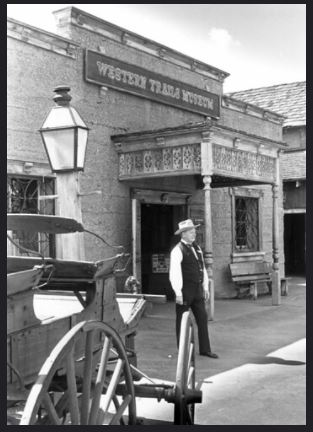
The original Western Trails Museum building at Knott's was either made of rammed-earth construction or concrete made to look like rammed-earth. This construction technique is fireproof and was used in the old mining town of Calico, California. This ca 1983 photo is courtesy of the Orange County Archives.

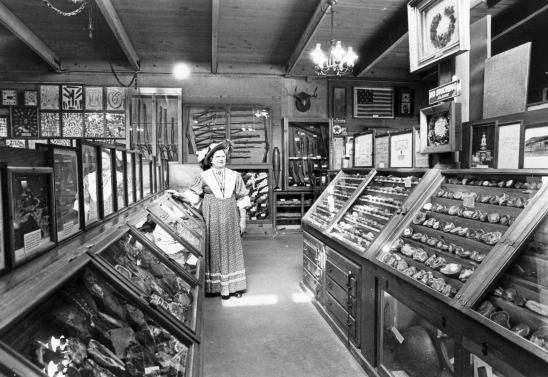
Irene Drake, docent, Western Trails Museum, original building at Knott's Berry Farm, 1983. Courtesy of the Orange County Archives.

In 1956, Knott's added the Western Trails Museum. Marion Speer, who had a degree from the Colorado School of Mines, worked for the Texas Company (Texaco Oil) and had spent a lifetime collecting geological specimens, Native American artifacts and relics of the Old West. In 1936, Speer established the Western Trails Museum in a small building he erected next to his house at 7862 Speer Drive (the street was named in his honor) in the Liberty Park section of Huntington Beach. With financial contributions from donors, including members of the Huntington Beach Chamber of Commerce, he added onto the building, twice. It was said to be the largest private collection in existence.

Marion Speer was a friend of Walter Knott, and an enthusiastic supporter of Knott’s efforts to preserve the memory of the pioneers by creating Ghost Town, which began in 1940. As early as 1941, Speer wrote articles for Ghost Town News, which was the Knott’s Berry Farm newspaper. In 1956, twenty years after creating his museum, Speer (at age 72) donated his carefully catalogued collection of 30,000 items to Knott’s Berry Farm in return for Knott’s agreeing to house it, display it and retain Speer as curator. Speer continued in that position until he retired in 1969 at the age of 84.

The museum was initially housed in a building (which was razed in 1987 to clear a pathway to the new Big Foot Rapids ride) at Knott’s Berry Farm between Jeffries Barn (now known as Wilderness Dance Hall) and the schoolhouse. The Western Trails Museum is now just south of the saloon in Ghost Town.

== Calico Square ==
In 1951, Walter Knott inherited his uncle's silver mill in Calico, an old silver mining town near Barstow, where he worked as a child, then proceeded to purchase the entire town and restored the Calico Hotel there. Many structures were re-created on the ruins of their foundation. Other structures were disassembled, removed, and reassembled near the railroad depot to create the new Calico Square.

When folks wanted entertainment during the day, Walter provided several more intimate shows, more frequently.

=== Calico Saloon ===
The Calico Saloon at the west end of Market Street was the featured building fronting Calico Square. A tiny stage was located above the west end of the balcony, later it was replaced by a wide formal stage, south behind the bar. It hosted a variety show inside with a piano player, a few vaudeville routines, and "Dakota Dan", "Calico Kate" and Marilyn and Cecilia Hargrave, sister dancing girls performing the can-can finale (and later immortalized as the fiberglass dancing girl figures on a bench outside the saloon.) A wide stairway led up to the interior and outside balconies. The inside balcony provided additional seating and tables, along with the best view of the show. A pair of baskets operated like a dumbwaiter to lift meal orders up to the hostess there.

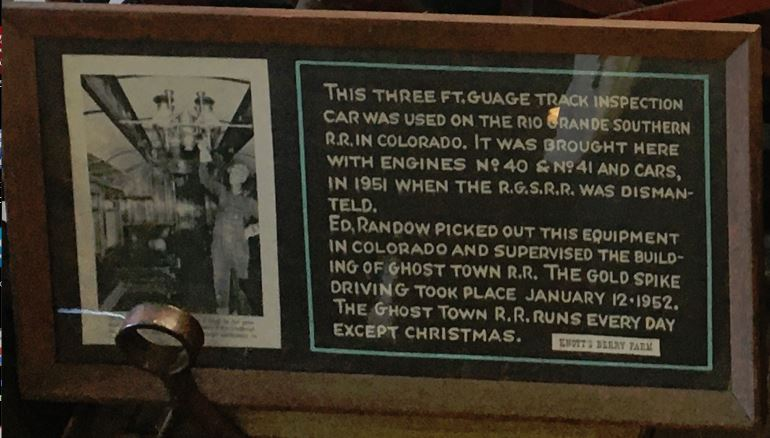
Ed "Big Daddy" Roth, who was a well-known artist, cartoonist and custom-car designer (He was famous as the creator of the Rat Fink character) worked as an artist and sign painter for about a decade in the 1970s at Knotts. The distinctive lettering on this sign and numerous others in the museum and elsewhere in the park was his work. This particular sign and the referenced track inspection car are now at the Southern California Railway Museum.

Outside in Calico Square Harvey Walker played Doctor I. Will Skinem performed his Medicine Show and peddled "Boysenberry Elixir" from his wagon/stage near the popcorn cart, the same wagon stage featured Professor Mal-De-Mers, and a young Steve Martin on banjo between performances at the Bird Cage Theater. Cowboys confronted the sheriff and his posse. They performed shootouts with flips and stunts, even a high fall. To wrap it up, fifteen minutes of comedy involved the Boot Hill Undertaker trying to remove the body from the Calico Square Wild West Show. As of 2026, the Knott's Berry Farm's Wild West Stunt show performances are scheduled at the Covered Wagon Camp, with impromptu shootouts in front of the blacksmith, outhouse, and Calico Saloon.

Between the saloon and the general mercantile was the Post Office which was for a time a real working U.S. post office and Wells Fargo Express walk-in attraction displays. The post office featured cutting-edge 1870s postal technology and the Express office depicted activities of a gunsmith. Contemporary postage stamps can be purchased there daily from 11:00 a.m. to 5:00 p.m. and mail deposited is dutifully forwarded to the U.S. Postal Service.

=== Ghost Town & Calico Railroad ===
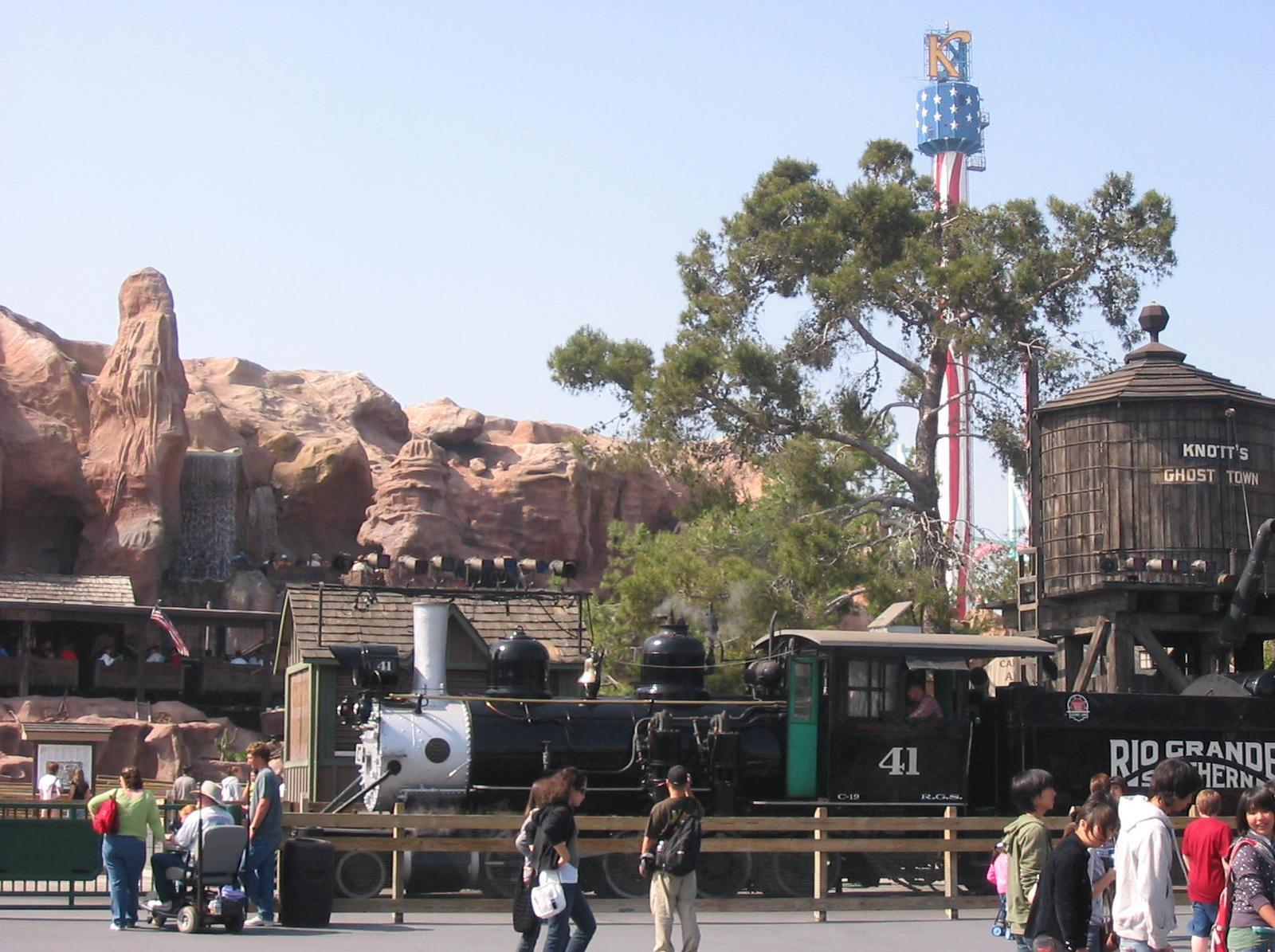
RGS No. 41 C-19 steam locomotive

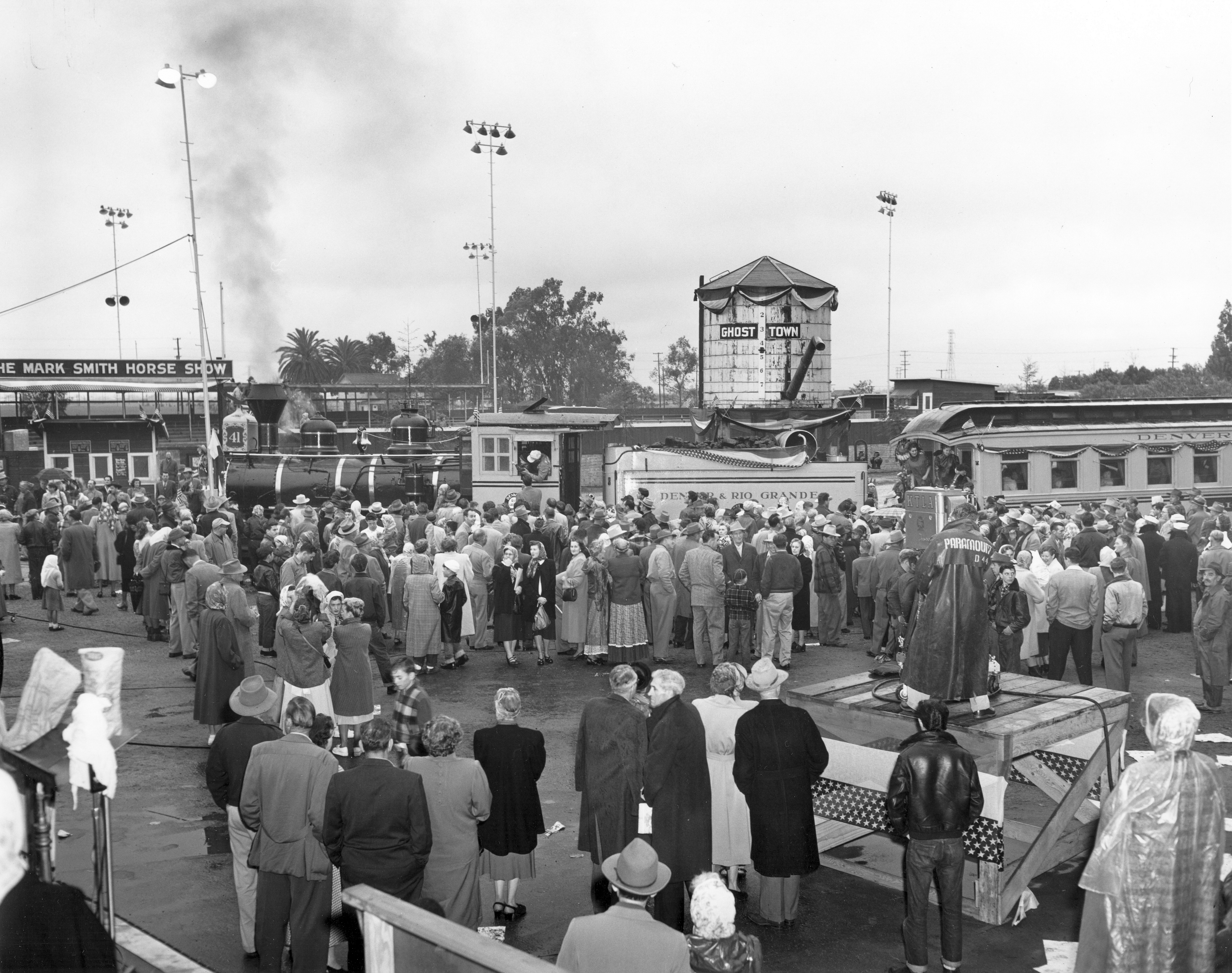
Grand Opening of the Calico Railroad in 1952.

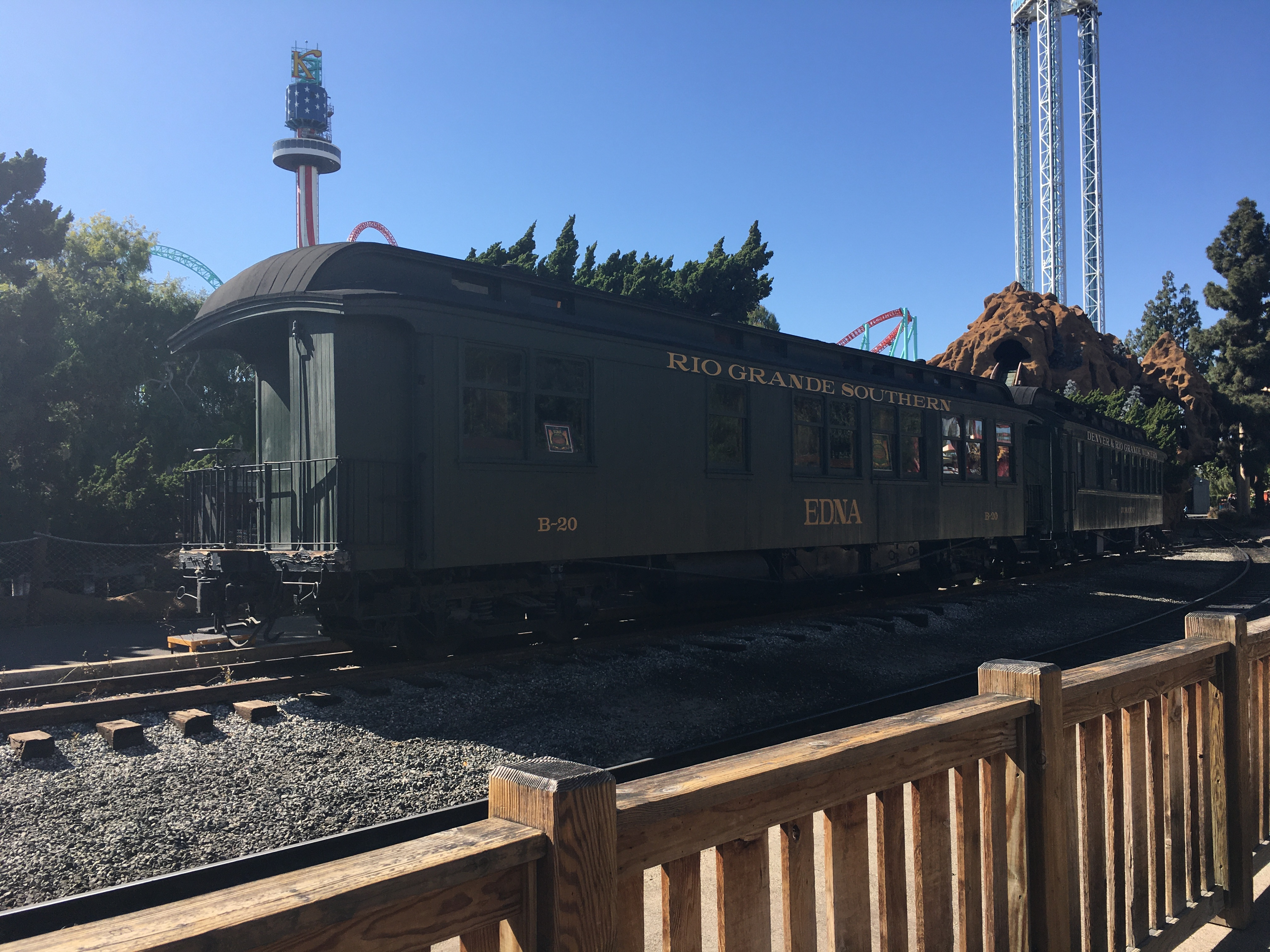
The GT&C business car Edna was originally the traveling office and living quarters of the president of the Rio Grande Southern Railroad. It was named for the daughter of Edward Turner Jeffery, who was president of the Rio Grande Southern RR (as well as the Denver & Rio Grande Railroad and Western Pacific Railroad concurrently). The Edna is one of only a small handful of narrow-gauge business cars in the United States still in existence.

In 1951, work began to grade and lay track for a grand circle rail route for recently acquired authentic 3 ft (914 mm) narrow gauge C-19 engines No. 340 Green River (renamed Gold Nugget #40) from the Denver & Rio Grande and No. 41 Red Cliff from the Rio Grande Southern, historic Consolidation class (2-8-0) locomotives from Colorado. They would haul a yellow combination baggage/coach No. 103 Calico with arrows embedded near the baggage door (now renamed to original Chama, arrows and numbers removed and painted in heritage period Pullman-green livery of D&RGW) and several more vintage wooden passenger coaches filled with guests on round trip excursions when the route opened on January 12, 1952. The Durango parlor car, the Silverton observation sleeper and the B-20 Edna Business cars were held with the caboose on sidings during normal operation. Whether in the heavyweight steam train or the light duty Galloping Goose No. 3, the highlight for many guests was their encounter with the "train robbers" of Knott's Scenic Route of the Ghost Town & Calico Railroad.

=== Calico Mine Train ===
Bud Hurlbut (Wendell "Bud" Hurlbut 1918-Jan. 5, 2011) of Hurlbut Amusement Company constructed Calico Mine Train which opened in 1960 on Walter Knott's property at a cost of $1.5 million as a concession, and paid Walt a portion of ticket sales. Hurlbut created this rumbling tour aboard six ore cars fitted along the sides with benches behind a representation of a small steam locomotive on a narrated journey touring the "Calico Mine".

Admission could be purchased from the shack at the base of the trail up to the station. An underground lake, steam geyser, shaft elevator, Philip Deidesheimer's square-set timbering construction techniques on the lift hill and several glimpses of the "Glory Hole" could be seen aboard this enclosed power assisted gravity coaster. A day-glow painted cavern featured several formations of stalactites hanging from the ceiling, and stalagmites building slowly from the floor, to dramatic organ music. Dead Man's Trestle was then crossed slowly before the train became a "runaway" through a blasting zone and cave-in for a thrilling climax of this ride.

Along the front was an overhang built to cover the Mule Train boarding area. The Mule Trail was relocated east across Beach Boulevard, and then removed entirely when those shallow canyons were converted to the picnic grounds.

When Walt visited Bud during construction he asked, "Do you know what you are doing?" and even though he had invested every cent and more, Bud replied "Yes." He told the story later and added "…and I never lied to him again." Bud lived in an apartment with a cot and refrigerator, hidden inside near the train storage tracks and repair shop; a short commute to an endless task. It incorporated many innovative designs, such as being the first attraction to incorporate a hidden switchback queue. When Walt Disney came to ride he was astonished enough to exclaim "You old S.O.B!" because the trail was obscured, it appeared to have a shorter wait than actual, which is now the industry standard.

Bud was also the operator of the Knott's Lagoon attractions – the merry-go-round, the row-boat and peddle-boat rental, the Cordelia K. Steamboat side-wheel steam boat, and continued to construct superior amusement park steam locomotives and trains, like the Miniature Train circling Knott's Lagoon. He would continue to create world class attractions, such as the Antique Auto Ride and Timber Mountain Log Ride at Knott's and other theme parks. The Calico Mine Train remains a popular attraction.

=== Judge Roy Bean's Saloon ===
A faithful re-creation of "The Jersey Lilly" Judge Roy Bean's Saloon in Langtry, Texas opened in 1947 with casks on each end of the bar disguising Boysenberry Drink fountains. Coin-operated vintage gambling machines were converted to amusements where every pull was a winner and rewarded one souvenir token.

Couples could "Get Hitched" in a comedic mock matrimonial ceremony, conducted by "The Judge" barkeep and justice of the peace. The bent horseshoe nail 'wedding rings' were selected to fit the bride and groom from a pailfull. A painting of Lillie Langtry was purported to adorn the wall, which upon further examination turned out to be the unsinkable Molly Brown. This building was later moved west to Calico Square for construction of the Native Dancer performance stage of Indian Trails.

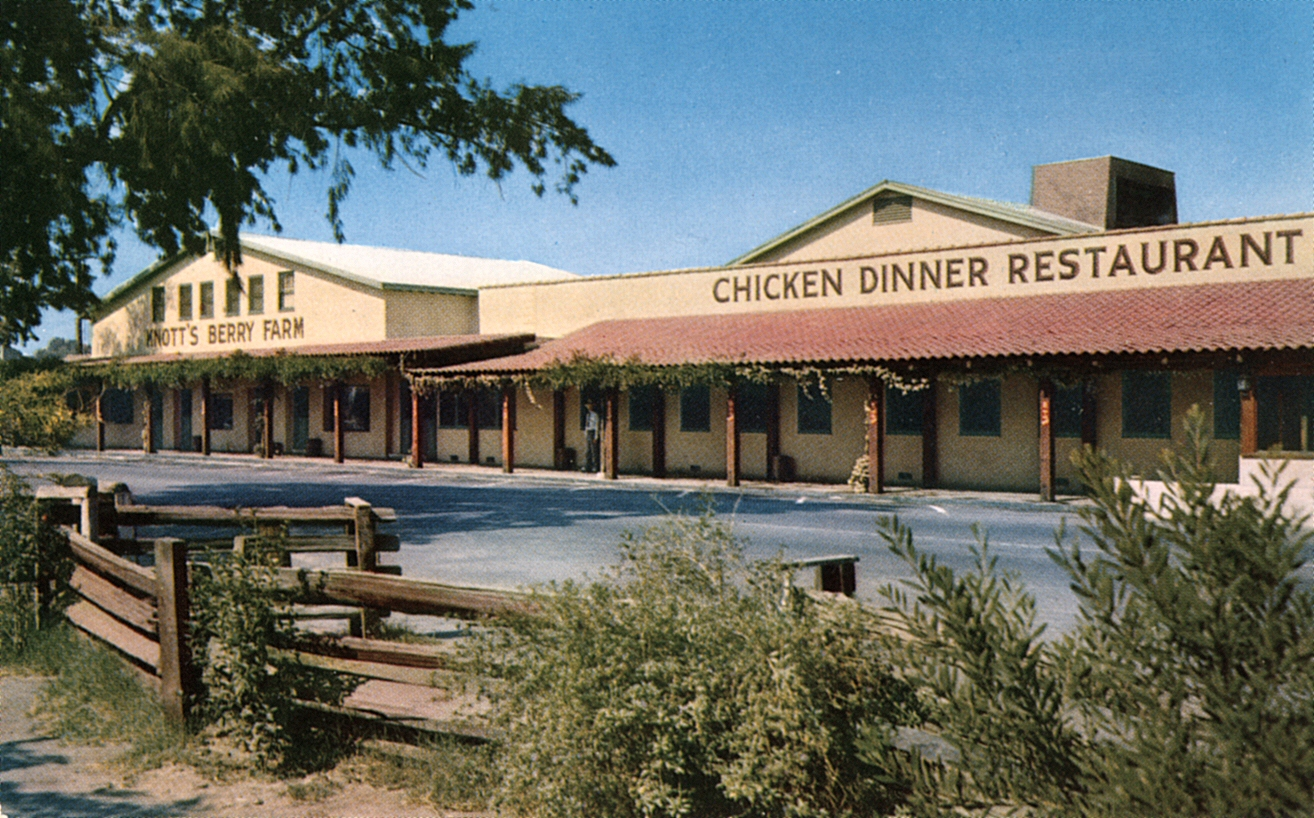
Mrs. Knott's Chicken Dinner Restaurant at Knott's Berry Farm in Orange County, California, ca. 1955.

== East side ==
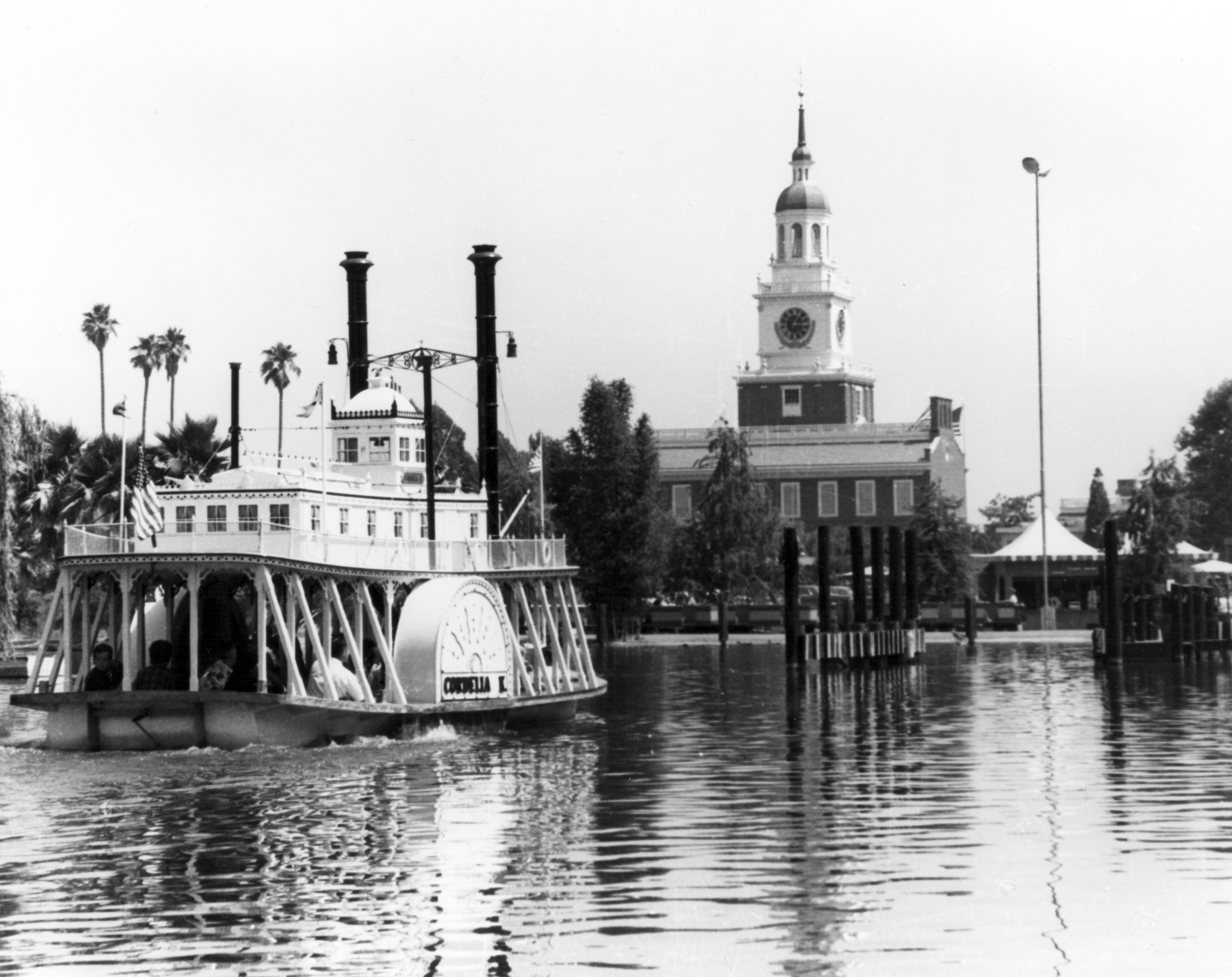
The riverboat Cordelia K crosses the man-made lagoon at Knott's Berry Farm.

Beach Boulevard bisected the property, but that did not halt development. A tunnel was built under the road for two-way traffic, later converted to eastbound motor traffic and pedestrian underpass. Developments on the east replaced the last orchards with Jungle Island, Knott's Lagoon, the temporary home of the Mule Train, and, eventually, Independence Hall, the Picnic Grounds, the main parking lot which replaced Knott's Lagoon, Soak City, and the final relocation of the Church of Reflections.

=== Jungle Island ===
Jungle Island, home of the Woodamels, could be reached by presenting a "C" ticket from the Super Bonanza Book or purchasing a ticket from the booth at one end of a covered bridge for admission across a shallow moat to a forested hill where children found adventure and played hide-and-seek games all day. Woodamles were "creatures" made from strange shapes of wood with glowing googly eyes and nearby speakers to give them voice. Kids could ride a pair of woodamles at the water's edge like a teeter-totter, which activated splashing effects. Another woodamle nearby was ridden like a rocking horse to spray a stream of water out over the moat. There were paths up the terraced hill which led to more woodamles and activities. The catawampus" woodamle survives beside the windmill in Ghost Town, but Jungle Island and the adjoining Burro Trail were incorporated into the private picnic grounds in the 1990s.

=== Knott's Lagoon ===
North of Jungle Island, Knott's Lagoon covered more than an acre with an artificial lake, encircled by a miniature railroad with a carousel at its edge, by the ticket and boat house. Bud Hurlbut operated the amusements, and built most of them. The lake featured rental rowboats and paddle-boats and the Cordelia K. – a side-wheel riverboat excursion named for Walt's wife. Corn kernels could be purchased by the handful from gum-ball machines mounted on poles near the water's edge. A popular activity for local residents was feeding the ducks who lived there year-round. Knott's Lagoon was bulldozed and paved over to become the main parking lot when Camp Snoopy was built on the former North parking lot. Some ducks moved to other parks and lakes, but many ducks still live and gather in the Jungle Island moat north of Independence Hall, and many local residents still stop by regularly to feed the ducks and coots.

== Expansions ==
Frequent activities at what Knott called a "summer-long county fair" included – naturally – boysenberry pie eating contests. When Disneyland was built in nearby Anaheim, the two attractions were not seen as direct competitors, due to the different nature of each. Walt Disney visited Knott's Berry Farm on several occasions, and hosted the Knotts at his own park (including inviting the Knotts to Disneyland's opening day). The two Walters had a cordial relationship, and worked together on a number of community causes.

As Knott's Berry Farm continued to grow in the 1950s, new displays were added.

=== Haunted Shack ===
A featured attraction of 1954 which existed at both Knott's Berry Farm and the recently acquired Calico, California was a walk through amusement purporting to demonstrate aberrations of gravity.

Tickets were sold at a window at the head of the queue which ended in a group waiting area. A tour guide would then collect the tickets as guests were seated on benches facing a fence built in forced perspective behind a level concrete slab in the shape of a cuneiform cross. A tall and short guest were selected as volunteers to demonstrate a mysterious property of the property – when they swapped places, they were perceived to change size. Guests were then led down a canyon to witness water flowing uphill. Then into the first room of a highly slanted shack containing a pool table where every shot sinks to the highest corner pocket, a shelf where a soft drink bottle was seen to roll uphill, and a broom was seen to stand unsupported at a slant.

In the next room, guests were selected to stand "off the wall" and women were challenged to rise "Lady Like" from a seat. Then moving outside, water was hand-pumped to a hanging pail but always flowed to one side and missed. To explain the water, a sliding panel was moved revealing a water faucet hanging in mid air from a wire, with a steady stream of water pouring out. Then the group moved into the bedroom to witness a scene with the shack's owners, 'Shaky Sadie' in a rocker and 'Slanty Sam' in bed. The lights dimmed revealing spooks of luminous paint. From an outhouse at the exit, words were heard complaining about the sudden queue for the potty from inside, stating they may have to wait awhile – then the door would fling open revealing the surprise of a seated human skeleton with newspaper as if reading.

Walter Knott moved the core structure from Esmeralda County, Nevada to his replica ghost town of "Calico" which he began building in the 1940s. Lester Wilson designed and operated the attraction.

The tour would be led by the character "Slanty Sam" or "Shaky Sadie". The guide would tell "The Legend of the Haunted Shack" and show a number of optical illusions including water that appeared to flow uphill, a usable chair that appeared to be perched on a wall, and brooms that appeared to stand on end.

The Haunted Shack was an attraction at Knott's Berry Farm from June 1954, until it was demolished in 2000 and replaced by the "Monster Maze" after plans for a reverse bungee ride failed.

At a 2017 auction of Knott's Berry Farm memorabilia, a sign from the shack sold for $8,962.

=== Art Glow ===
Walter's son Russell's personal collection of fluorescent rocks that glowed under ultraviolet light.

=== El Camino Real – The Kings Highway ===
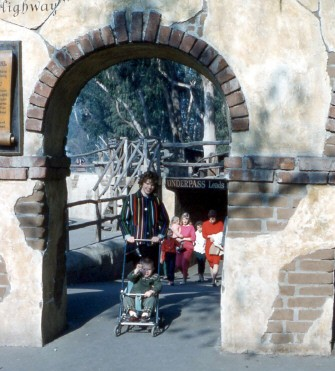
El Camino Real adobe arch entrance portal and rental stroller.

In 1956, a miniature El Camino Real was completed, running North from the end of Stage Road at the railroad depot, underneath a pedestrian underpass of the Stagecoach trail then alongside it, up to the far edge of the park at La Palma Avenue. Along the way were twenty-one adobe enclosures each displaying a miniature model accurately portraying life and activities of the next Spanish mission in California to the north, with descriptive text beside the viewing window.

The Candy Parlor anchored the South end of Gold Mine Road, rose garden featuring an antique four-face pedestal clock, past the Steak House with its Bakery, Garden Room and Rock and Book Shop across from Gold mine. Across Main Street, the Hangman's Tree stood ominously beside the adobe Fire Station providing little shade to the ore grindstone pulling burro circling the arrastra, and one could view the Covered Wagon Show Wagon Train Panorama in the 'G'Old Trails Hotel.

Across Market Street and to the East guests were entertained while circled around the bonfire in the Covered Wagon Camp. The path split as "The Trail to the Chapel" and "Trail to Indian Post and Art Glow" which went North across the Cable Car tracks, between the Seal Pool and Old MacDonald's Farm, under the Stagecoach path to the Merry-Go-Round, Children's Model T Ride – glorified coin-operated kiddie-rides set into pavement near miniaturized city street facades, and Antique Auto Ride – a car ride built by Bud Hurlbut electrically powered and guided by a center rail, which was later renamed Tijuana Taxi.

Calico Square expanded south as well. In 1958, Mott's Miniatures opened at the West end of Museum Lane in Jeffries Barn with the Boxing Museum. Next door to the east, the Western Trails Museum, then the School House and at the junction of School Road – a reproduction of The Bird Cage Theater the famous Tombstone, Arizona landmark.

Knott's Bird Cage Theatre featured live old time melodramas with fanciful subtitles such as Riverboat Revenge and Wreck of the Bluebell Express or Don't Switch the Engine, it has a Tender Behind wherein the audience was encouraged to participate by cheering the hero, "Aw" for the heroine, and to boo and hiss at the villain. It was the starting place for many small-time actors, as well as that of Steve Martin. Between shows, the actors would pose for photographs as walk-around atmosphere characters of Ghost Town.

Across Museum Lane to the north, Antique Pianos, the Denver & Rio Grande Railroad Supply House Miniature Train store, and the Gun Shop.

=== California Street Cable R.R. Cable Cars ===
In the early to mid-1960s, the park was visited more by "locals" than tourists. Children fortunate enough to have grown up in the area may still recall taking a battery-electric powered San Francisco Cable Car to the south end of the parking lot to drive a Model-T at Henry's Auto Livery on the northwest corner of Beach Boulevard and Crescent Avenue.

=== Boot Hill ===
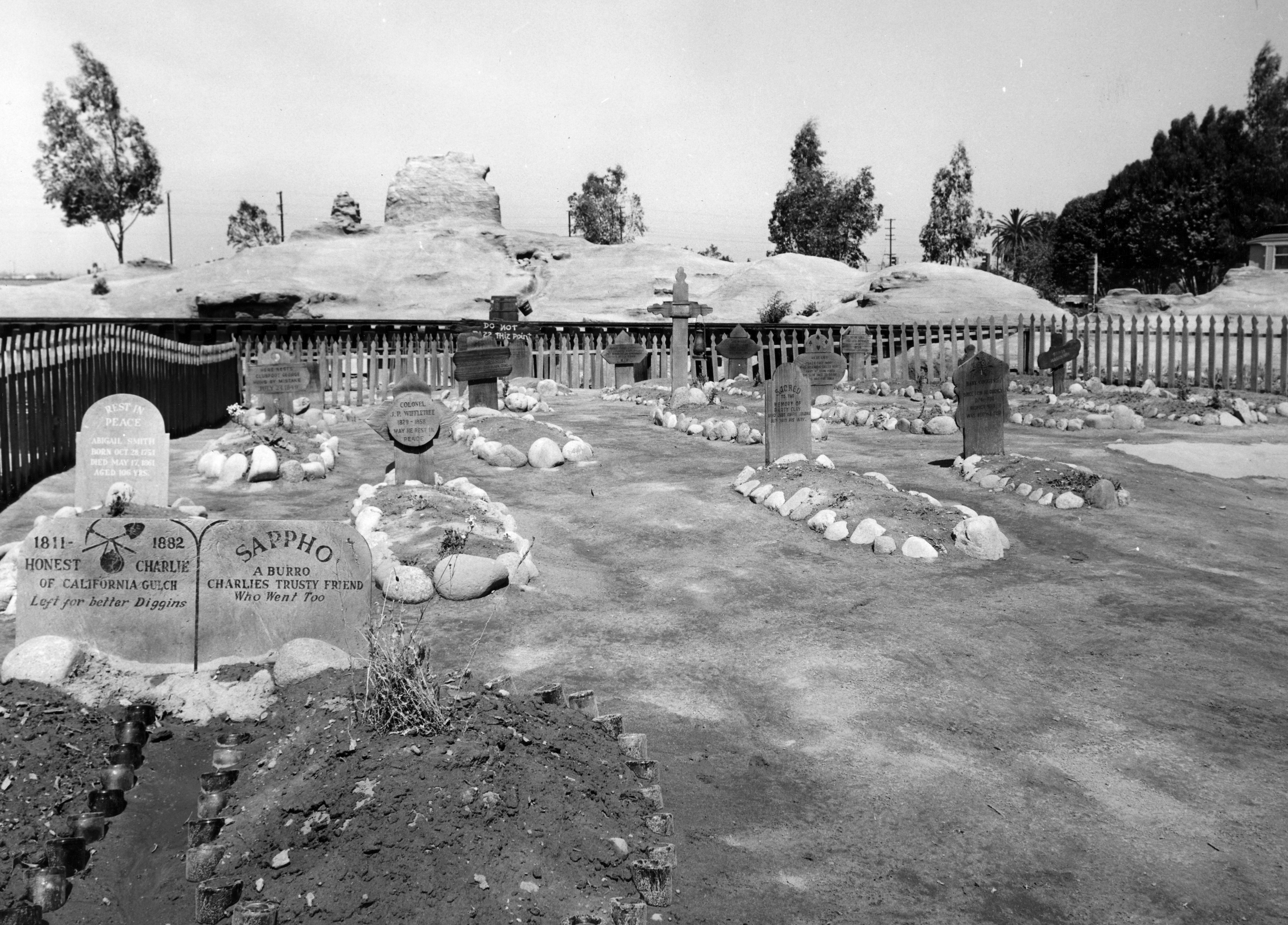
Boot Hill cemetery at Knott's Berry farm in the 1950s.

Between the blown-up Miner's Bank and the Grist Mill with its water-wheel grindstone bagging corn meal or wheat flour was a collection of mining equipment, shafts, and shacks playing somewhat realistic recordings of their activity. A few steps beyond, in Boot Hill Cemetery, headstones and grave markers gave light hearted humor to the fate of the deceased – Hiram McTavish invited visitors to gain good luck by offering the chance to feel a heartbeat while standing on his mound.

Stepping out onto Market Street, children of all ages would surround the circle of yellow paint on the ground under the pepper trees near the adobe arches and wait for the organ grinder to arrive. Turning the crank on the brightly painted music box, his trained monkey "Shorty" would hop around the edge of the circle, snatching the children's pennies and tipping his hat by way of thanks.

North past the Church of Reflections and Our Little Chapel by the Lake, was the Indian Trading Post on an island in the lake, Inspiration House, Art Glow, and Flamingo Pond, toward the area which would soon become home to Fiesta Village, one would cross the Cable Car tracks and walk past Old MacDonald's Farm to get to the Seal Pool.

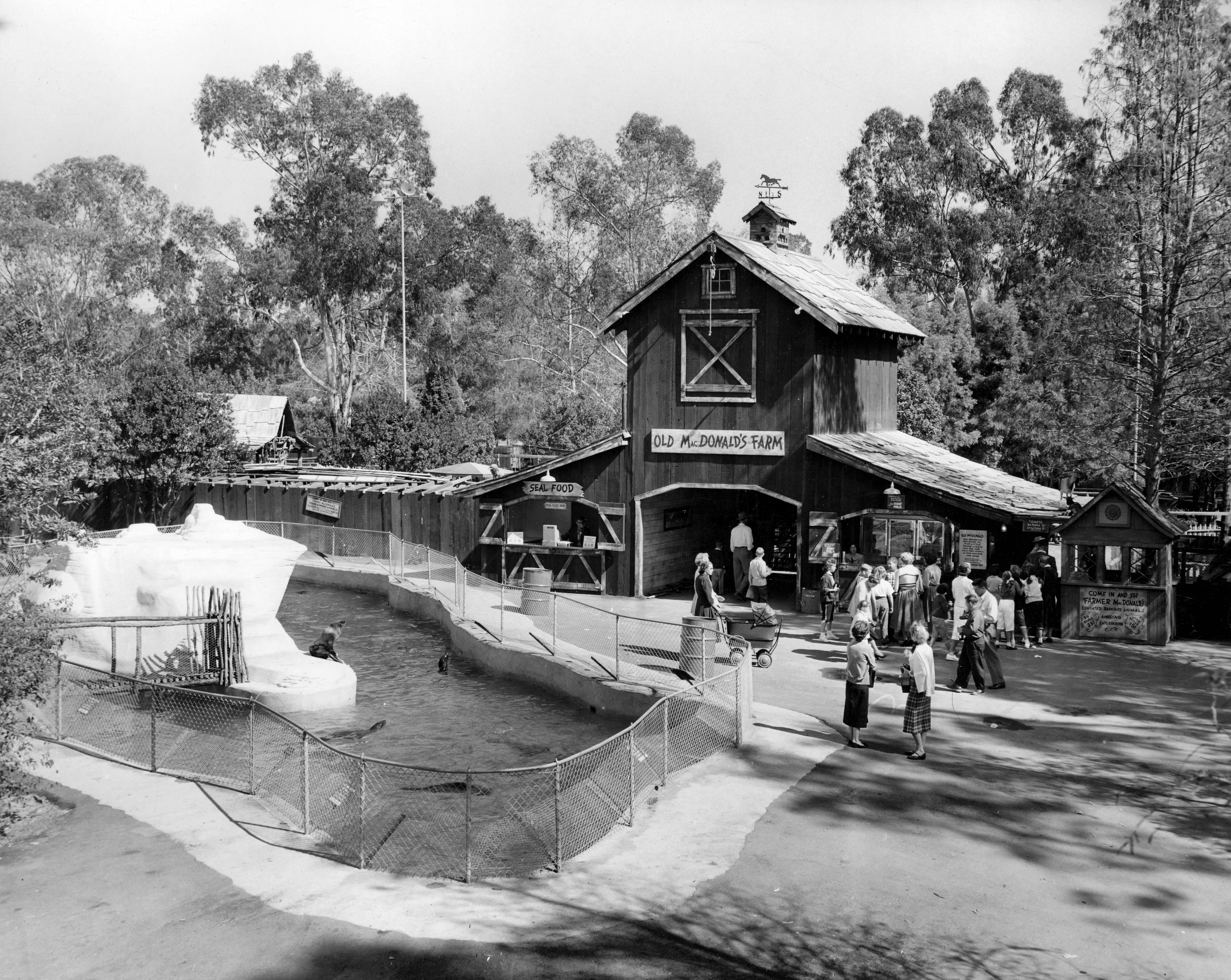
Old MacDonald's Farm and ticket booth, with the Seal Pool outside the entrance.

Old MacDonald's Farm, an elaborate petting zoo was an animal attraction that lasted longer than the Burro Train and Seal Pool was replaced in 1978 with Montezooma's Revenge and a restaurant. In Old MacDonald's Party Garden there were a handful of themed areas where parents could host their children's birthday party for a nominal rental fee. The coveted spot was the birdcage, an actual metal framework built up on stilts.

North across the Cable Car tracks, was Old MacDonald's Farm – a petting zoo with: goats, bunnies, and chickens, even a pair of hundred year old Galapagos tortoise, and for a short while, a baby elephant. A goat could climb the wall to a cage high atop the corner and becon folks into the enclave, for 25 cents. Parents cautioned their children to keep a tight hold on their shirt tails and bags of candy, for nothing was safe from the curious nibblings of the wandering goats. A nickel cranked in nearby converted gumball machines would buy a handful of alfalfa pellets to feed them. Henrietta, the piano-playing chicken, could be found within a wooden coop surrounded by glass. Pushing a nickel in the coin slide would illuminate a red lamp atop her toy piano and signal her to peck out a song; when she'd hit enough keys, a sprinkling of corn would be released into her food tray. The petting zoo was also home to a unique riding attraction – a one horse powered carousel swing. The Knott's had ingeniously converted a hot walker into a kiddie ride. Pairs or trios of children would sit on wooden seats suspended from the end of eight poles radiating from a central axis where a mule patiently waited under the canvas shade. The handler, wearing overalls with a bandanna around the neck, would sit on the rig behind the mule and start the swings circling by walking the mule.

Park goers were delighted by the sights and sounds (and smells) of the Seal Pool. Perhaps nothing was more exciting than holding the rapt attention of the seals as guests dangled one of a half dozen sardines, sold nearby in small paper bags – 15¢ or two for a quarter.

=== Independence Hall ===
All visitors to Buena Park are encouraged to enjoy complimentary admission to this patriotic attraction: Philadelphia's Independence Hall re-created brick-for-brick on the east property in 1966. Independence Hall continues to feature an audio presentation, with speakers located at appropriate tables, which recalls the debate which led to the United States Declaration of Independence, and is frequented by "Adventures in Education" student groups. Displays have included a replica of the Liberty Bell and a replica of the original Star Spangled Banner Flag which flew over Fort McHenry through a British attack during the War of 1812, which influenced Francis Scott Key to pen the poem that became the National Anthem of the United States. This replica of Independence Hall in Philadelphia was so accurately re-created that it was used in the 2004 film National Treasure, and the blueprints of the replica were requested to reference during the restoration of the original Independence Hall in Philadelphia.

== Perimeter fence ==
In 1968, 25 cents admission was charged for the first time, after the Knott family rerouted the Cable Car and circled the property in a tall fence. The fence enclosed three themed areas:

- Calico Ghost Town as originally built. Handstamp viewing lamps were added behind the new entrance gate starting north of the volcano. Exit turnstiles and the re-entry gates were added across Gold Mine Road, allowing ready access to the Steakhouse, dining and shops.
- Fiesta Village portraying Spanish California, a re-theme of the north property starting at the Church of Reflection.
- Gypsy Camp A new expansion in the former West parking lot, with Thieves Den a large amusement machine arcade (which is still present, but diminished by the world's largest Johnny Rocket's) an outdoor stage with the world's largest water curtain, 'caves' with a magic shop, air bazooka game, and featuring the immense John Wayne Theatre, later the water curtain would be moved into the theater, and the entrance through the John Wayne Museum would be incorporated into the Cordy's Corner shop when the Roaring 20's conversion built an elevated railway themed ramp spiraling up around Wheeler Dealer Bumper Cars up to a wide outdoor balcony along the back wall of the theater.

After the fence was installed, construction and development began at a rapid pace.

== Timber Mountain Log Ride ==
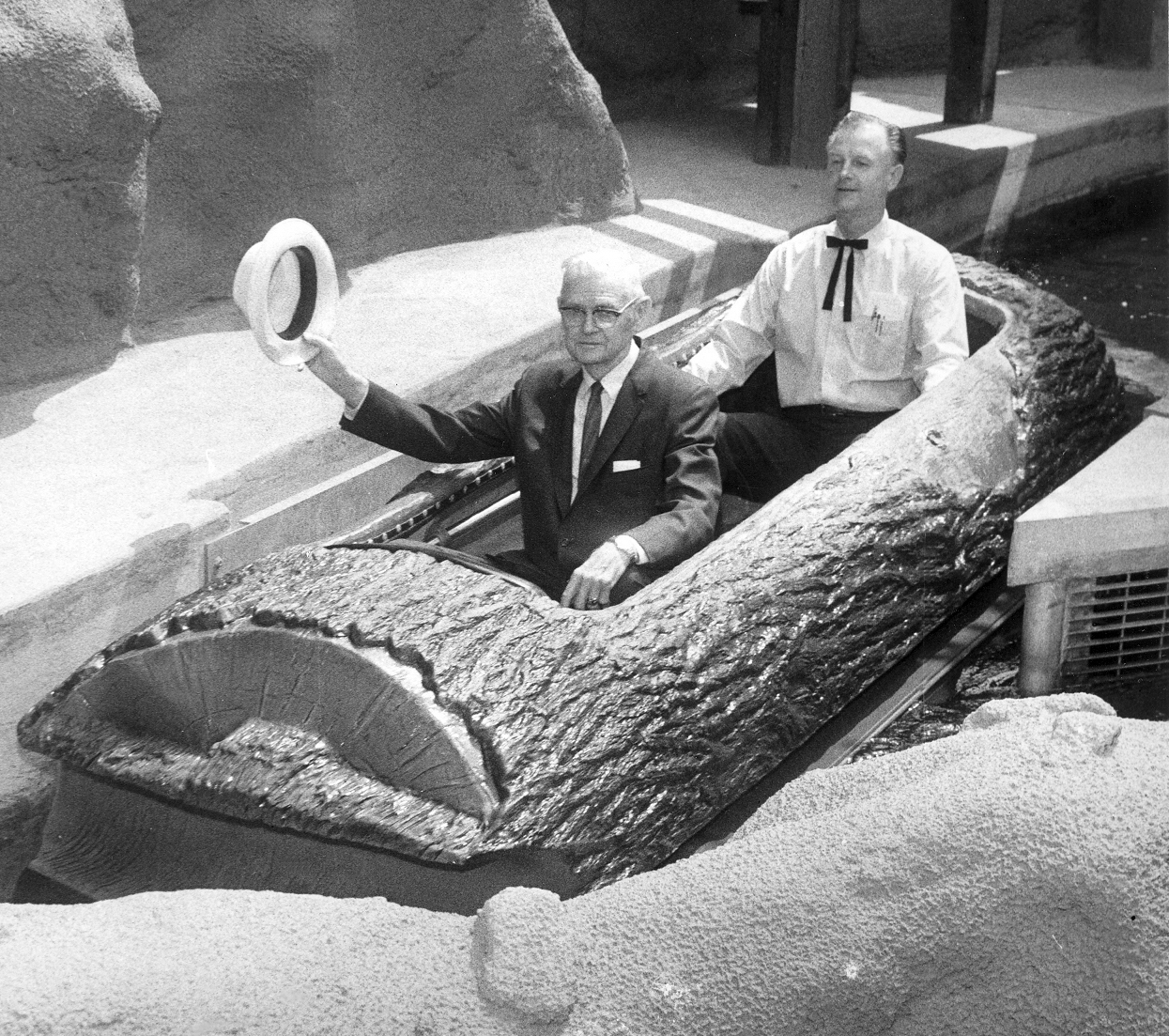
Walter Knott and Bud Hurlbut ride the Timber Mountain Log Ride in 1969

After a year of design and fabrication, Bud Hurlbut opened the sawmill themed log flume in 1969 – under the original name of Calico Log Ride. The first official public riders were John Wayne and his son Ethan. Arguably the best log ride in the world, it features vintage logging equipment including a small steam train on display within interior pine scented woodland forest scenes detailed with taxidermy forest animals, a dark interior drop, and a twin flume split passenger loading station. A lumberjacks logrolling competition show was featured for several years on the pond between the final plunge and the station.

== 1970s and beyond ==
On April 12, 1974, Cordelia Knott died. Walter turned his attention toward political causes, Roaring Twenties re-themed Gypsy Camp in the 1970s with the addition of a nostalgic traditional amusement area, Wheeler Dealer Bumper Cars, Knott's Bear-y Tales. Then with the northward expansion of a 1920s-era Knott's Airfield themed area featuring the Studio-K Dance Hall, Sky Cabin/Parachute Sky Jump and Motorcycle Chase steeple chase roller coaster above the electric guided rail Gasoline Alley car ride. The expansion was keystoned by the innovative new roller coaster Corkscrew.

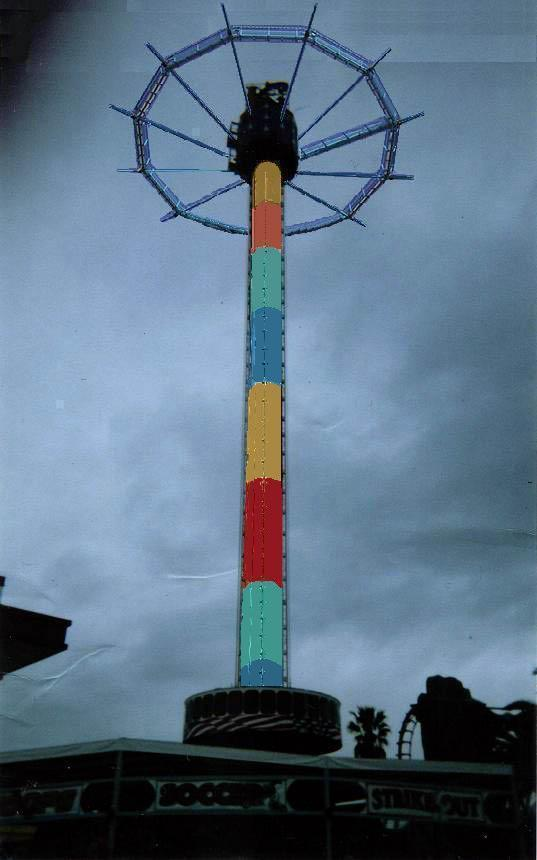
Sky Tower & Sky Jump/Sky Cabin

Sky Tower with the illuminated "K" in logo script at the top was built to support two attractions, the Parachute Sky Jump (now closed) and the Sky Cabin. Parachute Sky Jump boarded one or two standing riders anticipating the thrill of the drop into baskets beneath a faux parachute canopy. From the top, eight arms supported the vertical cable tracks of wire rope which lifted the baskets. The Sky Cabin ringed the support pole with a single floor of seats that are enclosed behind windows. The Sky Cabin ring revolves slowly as it rises to the top and back offering a pleasantly changing vista. Sky Cabin is very sensitive to weather and passenger motion, such as walking, which is prohibited during the trip. During winds 25 mph+ or rain it is closed. When built, Sky Tower was the tallest structure in Orange County (a distinction briefly held by WindSeeker).

Corkscrew debuted in 1975 as the first modern-day roller coaster to perform a 360-degree inverting element twice. It was designed by Arrow Dynamics of Utah.

Motorcycle Chase – A modernized steeplechase rollercoaster built in 1976 featured single motorbike themed vehicles racing side-by-side, each on one of four parallel tracks, launched together. One or two riders straddled each "Indian motorcycle" attraction vehicle. The tubular steel monorail track closely followed dips and bumps in "the road" and tilted to lean riders about the curves. Gasoline Alley, an electric steel-guiderail car ride below, was built together and intimately intertwined, which enhanced ride-to-ride interaction thrill value. Rider safety concerns of the high center of gravity coupled with the method of rider restraints caused it to be re-themed Wacky Soap Box Racers with vehicles now attached in four car trains, each car seated two riders, strapped in low (nearly straddling the track), surrounded by the close fitting car sides, and the dips and bumps of the track were straightened flat in 1980. Motorcycle Chase/Wacky Soap Box Racers was removed 1996 for a dueling loop coaster Windjammer Surf Racers. Now, Xcelerator, a vertical launch coaster takes its place.

On December 3, 1981, Walter Knott died, survived by his children who would continue to operate Knott's as a family business for another fourteen years before selling the park to Cedar Fair Entertainment.

In the 1980s, Knott's built the Barn Dance featured Bobbi & Clyde as the house band. It was during the height of the "Urban Cowboy" era. The "Barn Dance" was featured in Knott's TV commercials.

== Wild Water Wilderness ==
During the 1980s, Knott's met the competition in Southern California theme parks by theming a new land, and building two massive attractions:

- Kingdom of the Dinosaurs (1987) (primeval re-theme of Knott's Bear-y Tales)
- Bigfoot Rapids (1988), a whitewater river rapids ride as the centerpiece of the new themed area Wild Water Wilderness.

Boomerang roller coaster replaced the Corkscrew in 1990 with a lift shuttle train passing to and fro through a cobra roll and a vertical loop, for six inversions each trip.

Mystery Lodge (1994), inspired by General Motors "Spirit Lodge" pavilion, a live show augmented with Peppers Ghost and other special effects. It was among the most popular exhibits at Expo 86 in Vancouver, British Columbia, Canada. It was produced by award-winning experience designer Bob Rogers and the design team BRC Imagination Arts, and created with the assistance of the Kwagulth Native reserve in Alert Bay, British Columbia. Mystery Lodge recreates a quiet summer night in the village of Alert Bay, British Columbia then guests "move inside" the longhouse and listen to the storyteller weave a tale of the importance of family from the smoke of the bonfire.

== Knott's Special Events ==
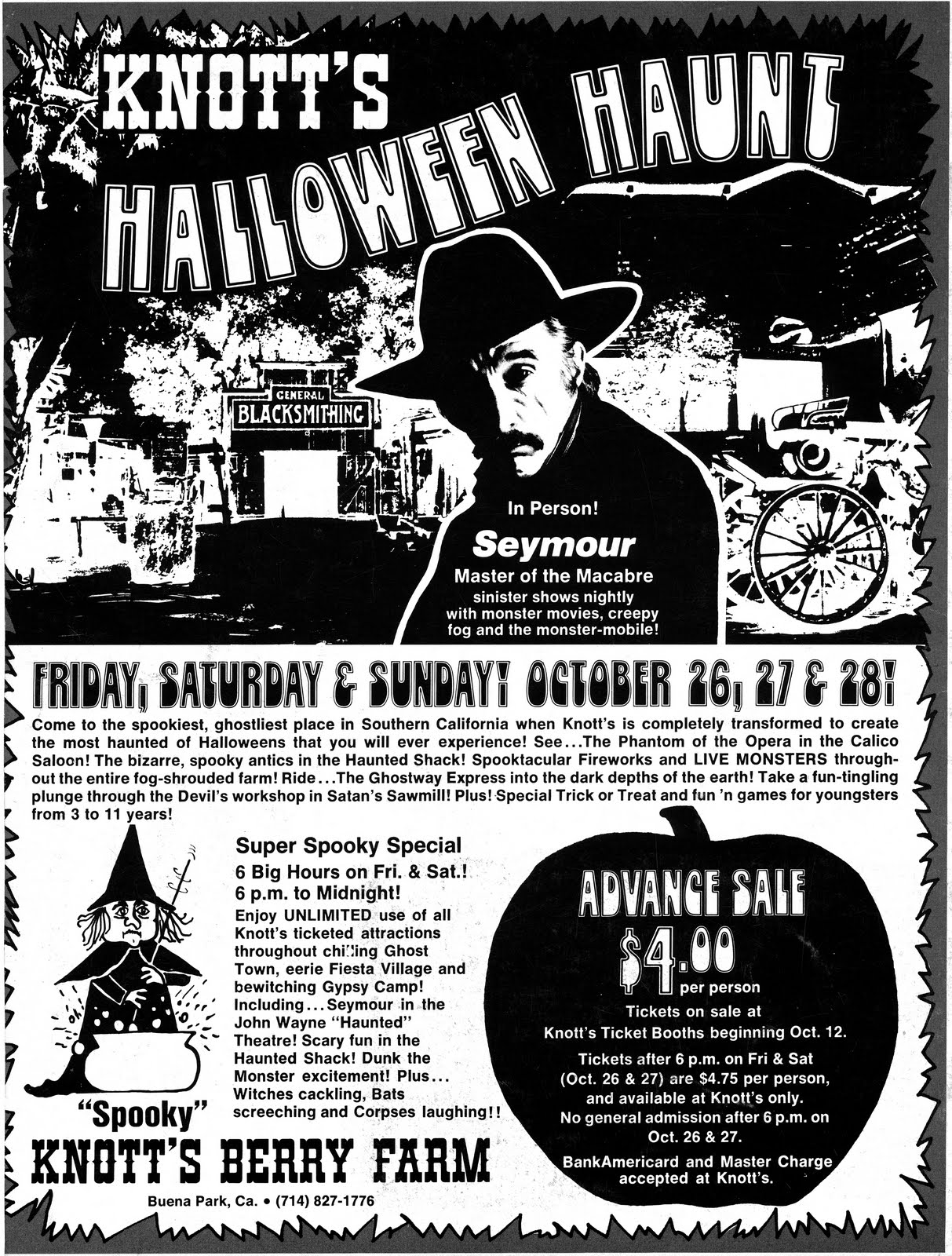
1973 Halloween Haunt poster.

Knott's has a number of special events through the year, the most famous of which is the popular Halloween Haunt, now known as "Knott's Scary Farm."

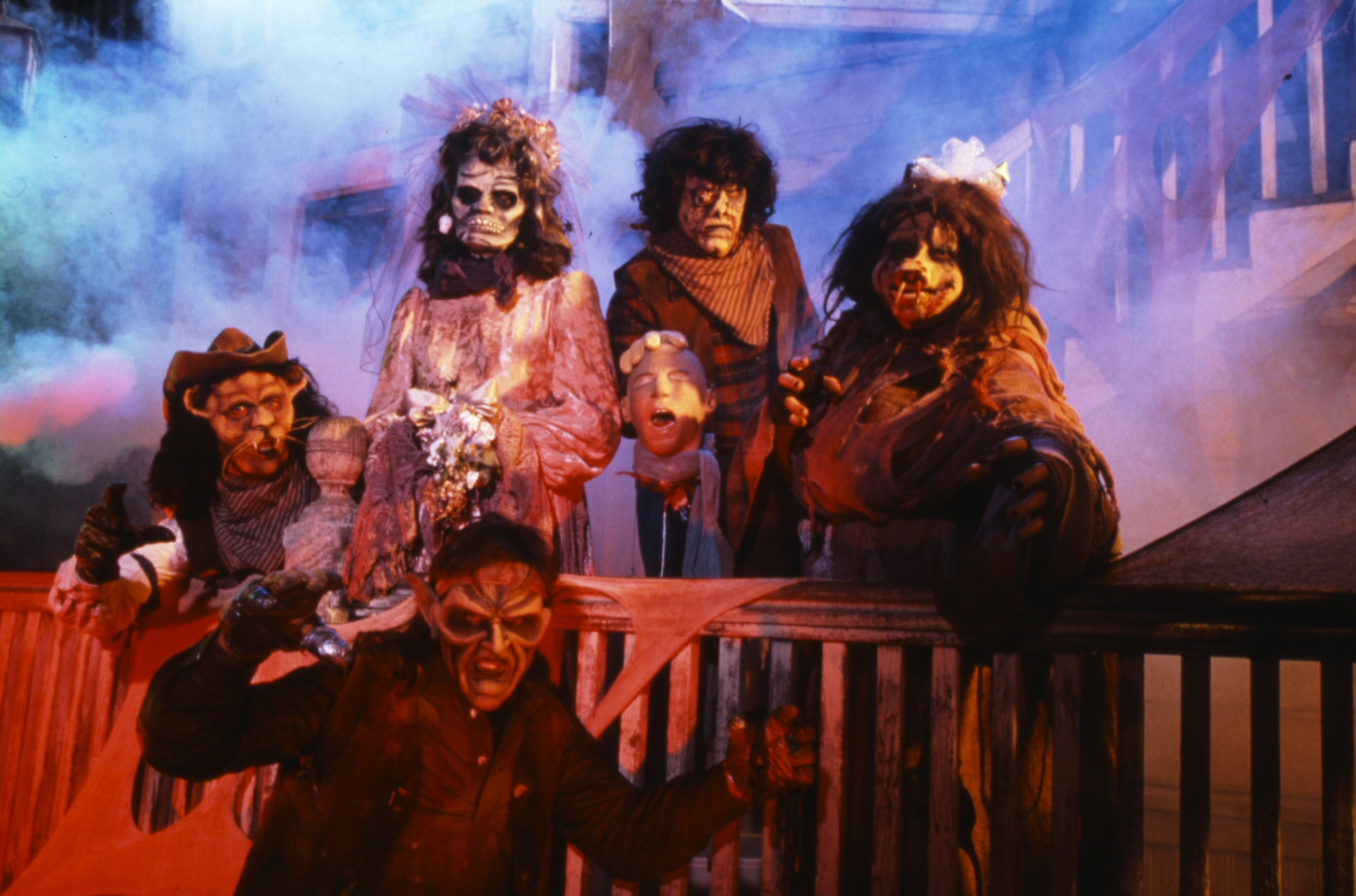
A sample of Knott's Scary Farm monsters.

In 1973, Knott's began its Halloween Haunt event, which has since grown into "the world's first, biggest, and most famous theme park Halloween event." The event was initially just two nights on Halloween weekend. Local horror movie host, "Seymour, Master of the Macabre," was booked to do a show in the John Wayne "Haunted" Theater, some spooky decorations were added to the park, and Bud Hurlbut dressed up in a gorilla suit to scare riders on the Mine Ride. It was remarkably well-received, and by the next year, the event sold out each night. Normally, the park was considered to be at capacity at 18,500 guests, but they sold well over 20,000 tickets, an unheard of success for a private event. Knott's Scary Farm now stretches for all of October and part of September, with a large contingent of enthusiastic fans, as well as locals from all walks of life vying to get a job as a "monster."
