= Paul Townsend (disambiguation) =

Paul Townsend is a British physicist.

Paul Towns(h)end may also refer to:

- Paul Townsend, guitarist for Hundred Reasons
- Paul Townsend, performer at Knott's Berry Farm's Wild West Stunt show
- Paul Townshend, musician, brother of Pete Townshend
