= Marion Speer =

American art collector and author (1885–1978)

Marion Artemus "Bob" Speer (1885–1978) established the Western Trails Museum in 1936. He was a lifetime collector of Native American and Old West artifacts, and author. He built a building next to his house in Huntington Beach, California, to house his collection and opened it to the public. Twenty years later, he donated his collection to Knott’s Berry Farm, where it remains.

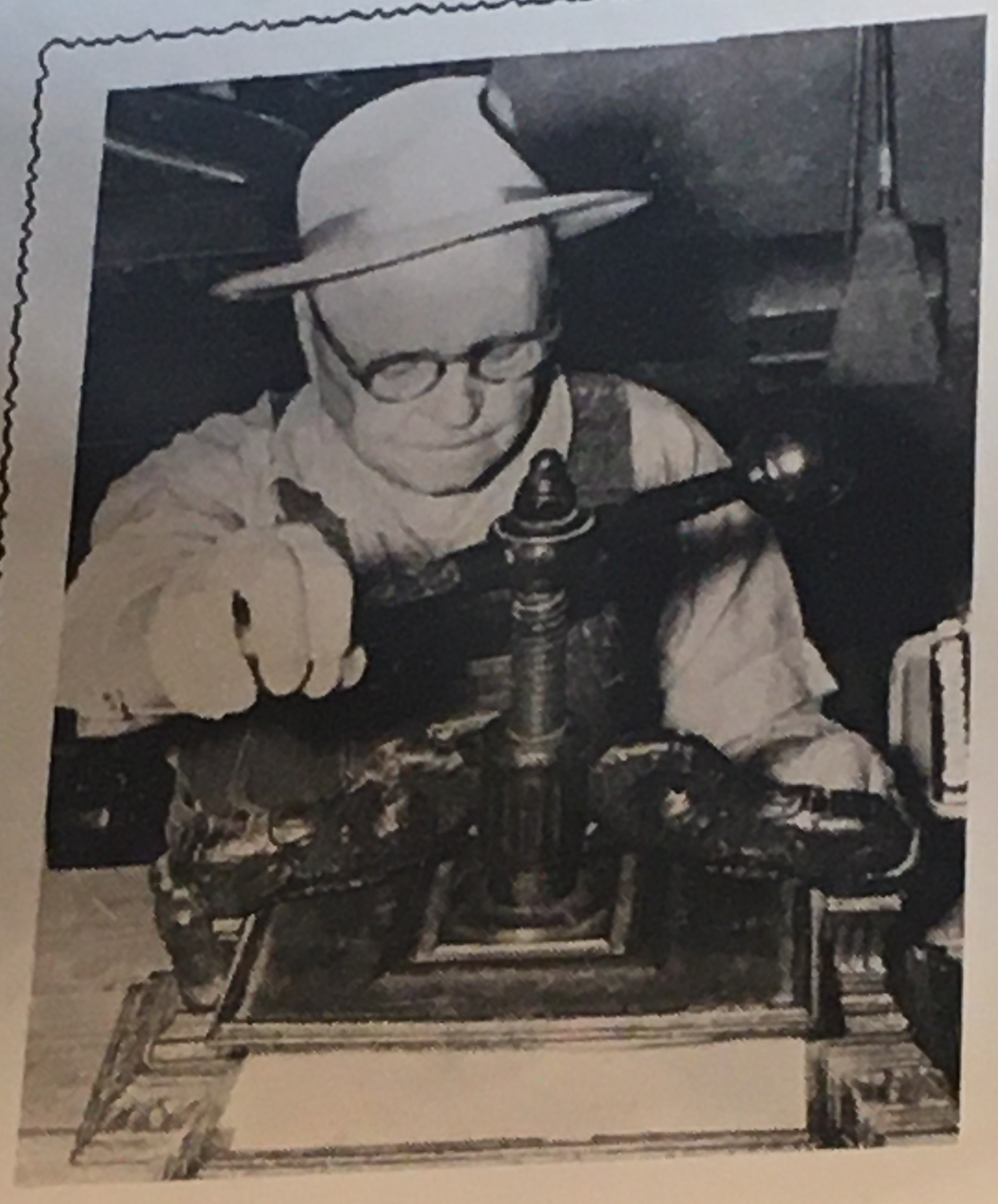
A large display board at the Western Trails Museum contains an image of Marion Speer operating an antique copy press.

== Lifelong collector ==
Speer was born the day after New Year's Day in 1885. He spent his boyhood in Texas, where his grandparents had been pioneers. He found his first Native American artifact at age four, which sparked an interest in collecting that continued for the rest of his life. He devoted his free time to nearly 250,000 miles (400,000 km) of traveling in the West, collecting historical items relating to pioneers and Native Americans, as well as geological specimens.

He was educated as a mining engineer at the Colorado School of Mines, which is America's premier university in that field. He initially could not afford to attend college, so he worked wherever he could, saving his money. Once he entered college he excelled, and caught the eye of a mining company, which offered to subsidize his education if he would work there after he graduated (which he did). In 1917, he went to work for the Texas Company (Texaco), until his retirement in 1950. He was a big part of the oil boom in Huntington Beach, California.

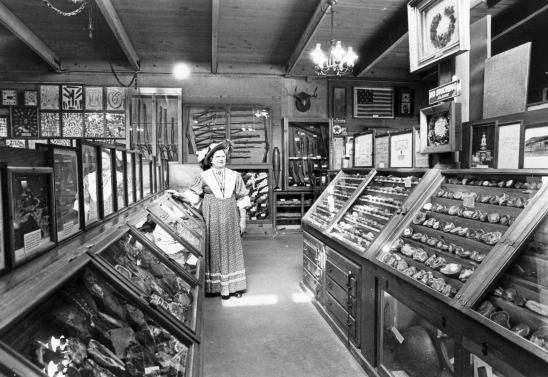
Irene Drake, docent, Western Trails Museum, original building at Knott's Berry Farm, 1983. Courtesy of the Orange County Archives.

He spent his vacations exploring the West, and in 1931, he wrote a book on his travels, entitled Western Trails.

== Western Trails Museum ==
In 1936, Speer established the Western Trails Museum in a small building he erected next to his house at 7862 Speer Ave. (The street was named in his honor) in the Liberty Park section of Huntington Beach. In 1941, a 600 sq ft (56 m^{2}) addition to the museum was completed. Funds for the addition were donated primarily by long-time friend J. D. Luke and businessmen who were members of the Huntington Beach Chamber of Commerce.

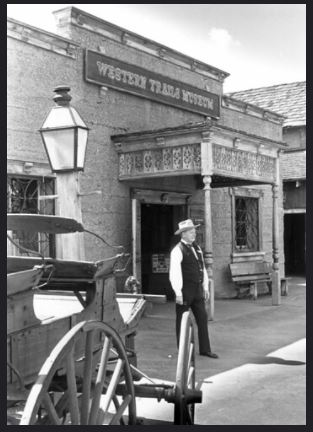
The original building at Knott's was either made of rammed-earth construction or concrete made to look like rammed-earth. This construction technique is fireproof and was used in the old mining town of Calico, California. This c. 1983 photo is courtesy of the Orange County Archives.

Another addition was completed in the mid-1940s. School groups and the general public would come to see his collection of 12,000 arrowheads, mineral specimens, fossils, guns, tools and other Old West artifacts. It was said to be the largest private collection in existence.

He always enjoyed excellent health, saying that he was never sick a day in his life. He often got so wrapped up in his museum work that he only got two or three hours of sleep at night.

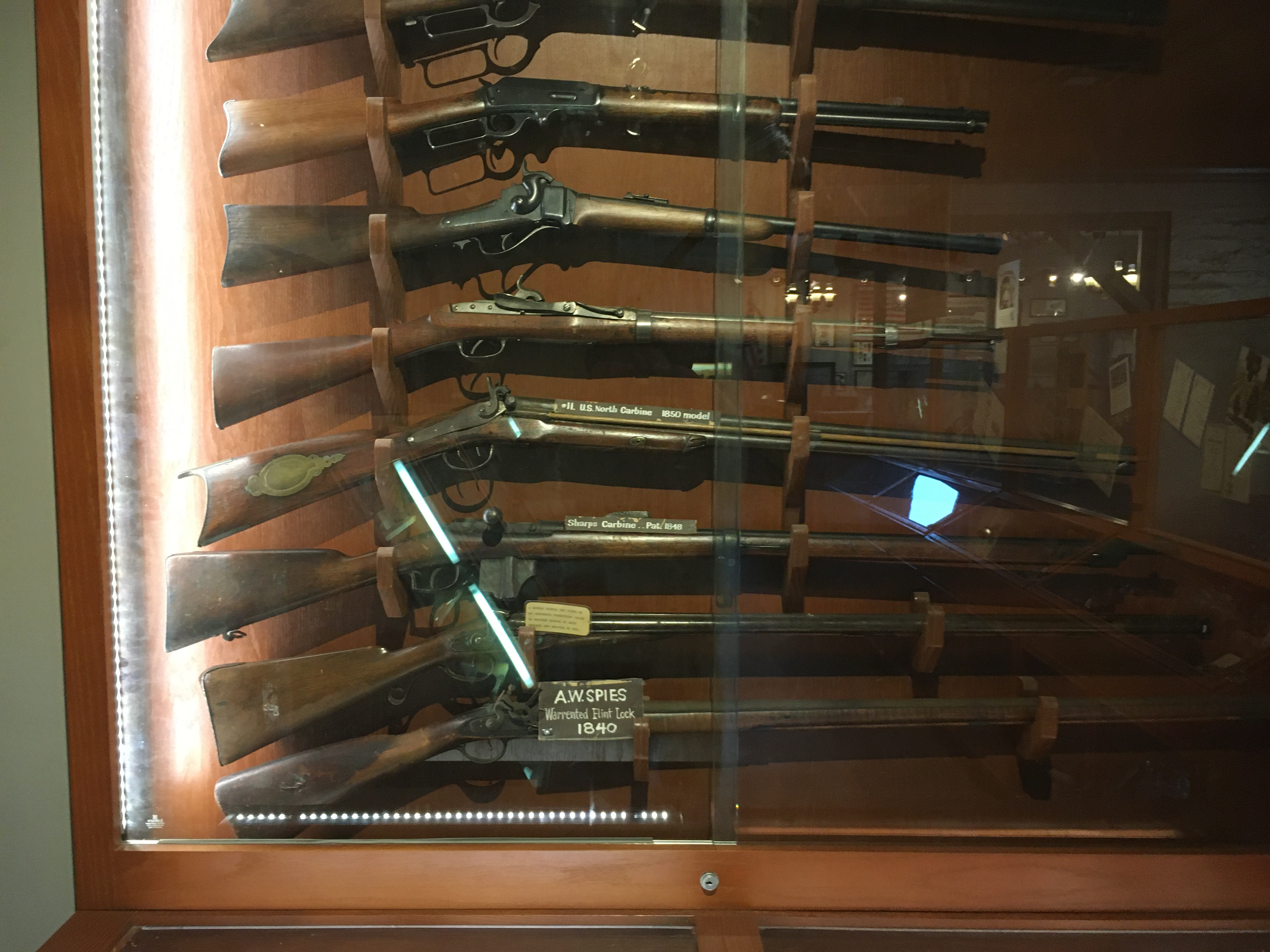
A sample of the guns on display at the Western Trails Museum

== Knott's Berry Farm ==
From the very beginning, Speer was an enthusiastic supporter of Walter Knott's efforts to create Ghost Town at Knott’s Berry Farm, which began in 1940. As early as 1941, Speer wrote articles for Ghost Town News, which was the Knott's Berry Farm newspaper. In 1956, twenty years after creating his museum, Speer (at age 72) donated the carefully catalogued collection (which had grown to 30,000 items) to Knott's Berry Farm in return for Knott's housing it, displaying it and naming Speer as curator. Speer continued in that position until he retired in 1969 at the age of 84.

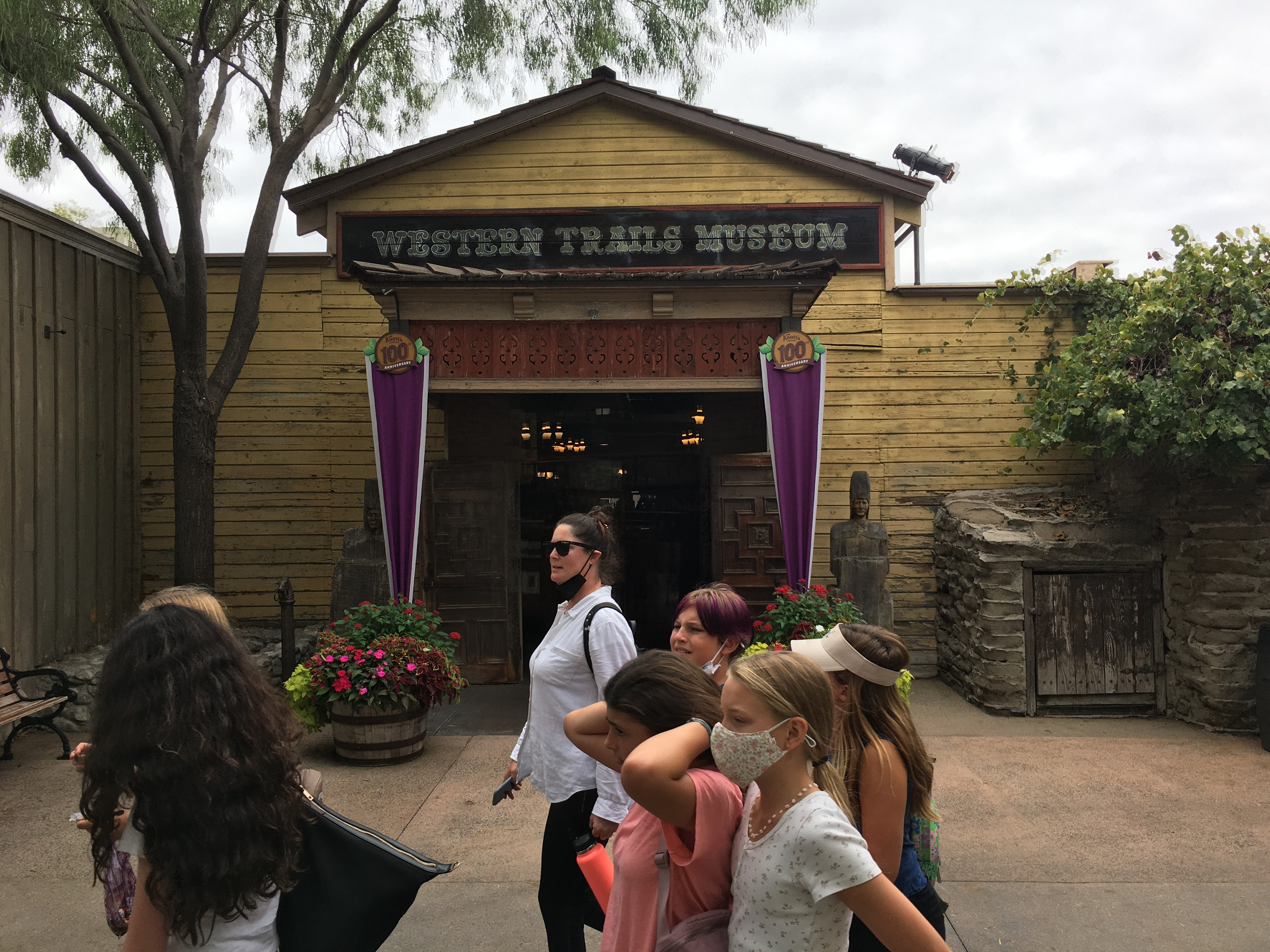
East Entrance, Western Trails Museum, current building at Knott's Berry Farm, Buena Park, California

The museum was once housed in a building (which has since been razed) at Knott's Berry Farm between Jeffries Barn and the schoolhouse. A year after acquiring the Speer collection, another noted museum collection, Mott's Miniatures came to Knott's. The collection, which depicted American life from Pilgrim times to the present (with even a working two-inch-wide television set), was housed in Jeffrey's Barn. The Western Trails Museum at Knott's is now just south of the saloon in Ghost Town.

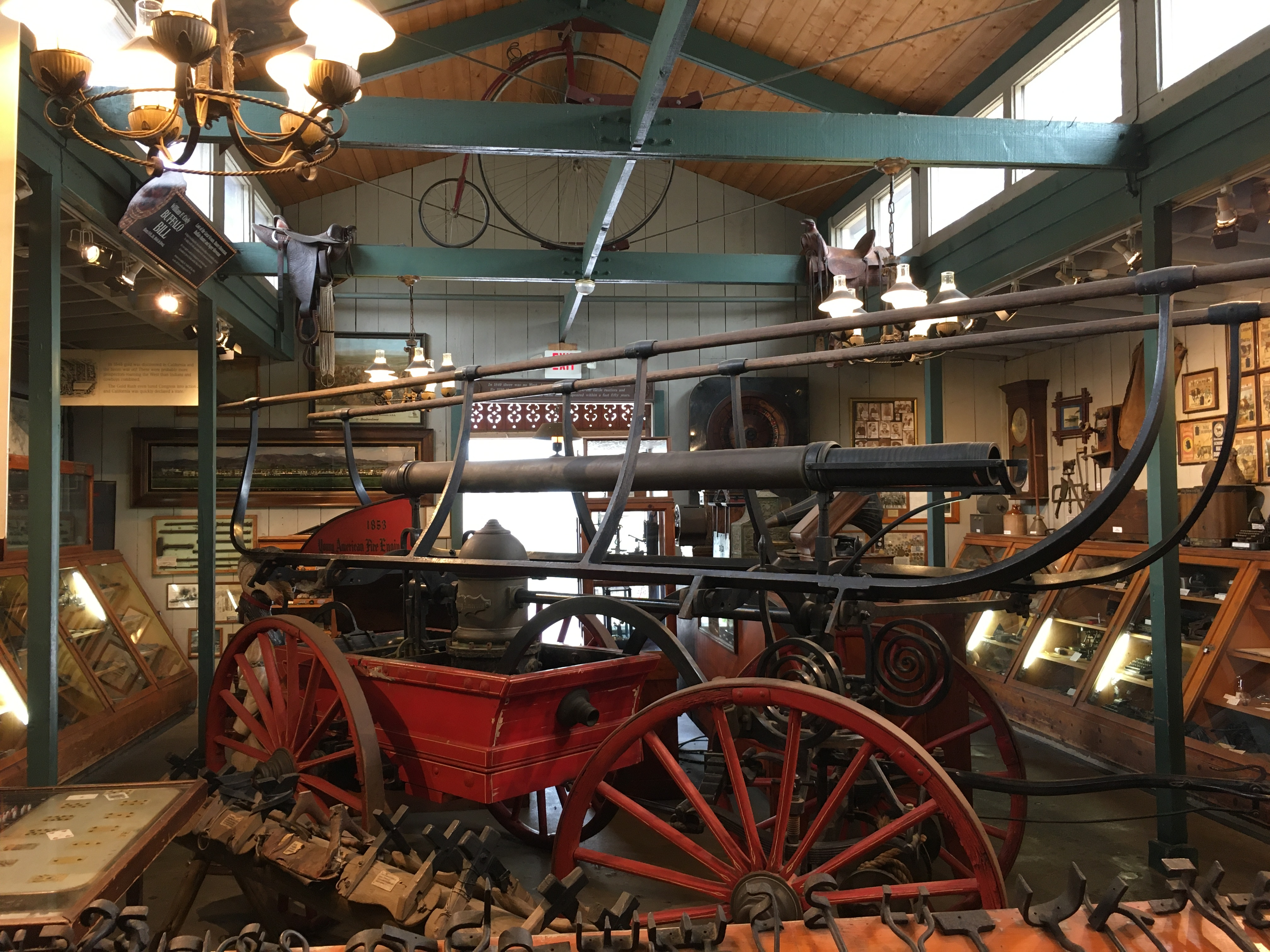
Center Room, Western Trails Museum, current building at Knott's Berry Farm, Buena Park, California

Marion Speer died in Orange County in 1978, at the age of 93.

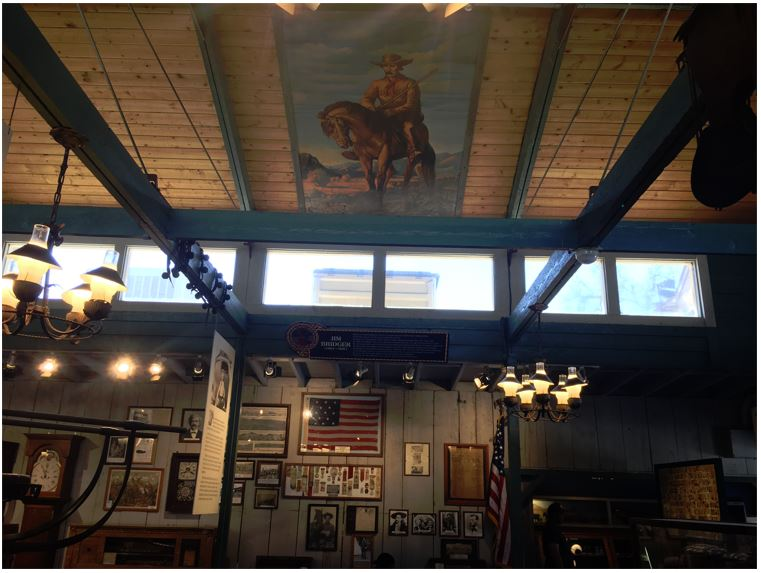
Center Room, Western Trails Museum, Knott's Berry Farm, 2021. A large portrait of Kit Carson by Paul von Klieben (who planned most of Ghost Town at Knott's) is on the ceiling.
