= Knott's Berry Farm's Wild West Stunt show =

Defunct stunt show

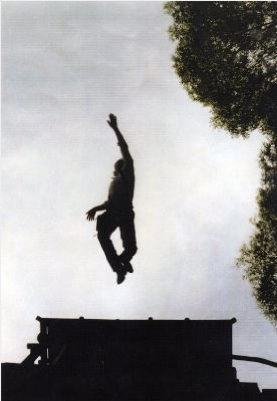
- Playing the part of a vacationing newlywed husband, Davey Thompson plunges to the ground in the climactic "high fall" ending of the old Wild West Stunt Show at Knott's Berry Farm. --Photo by Stephen Burhoe, 1987.

Knott's Berry Farm
- Area: Wagon Camp Theatre
- Coordinates: 33°50′39″N 117°59′57″W
- Status: Operating
- Opening date: October 7, 1974
- Closing date: 2005, 2015
- Replaced by: "Fool's Gold" (2005) "Frontier Feats Of Wonder (2016)

Ride statistics
- Attraction type: Stunt show
- Designer: Knott's Berry Farm
- Theme: Wild west

Knott's Berry Farm's Wild West Stunt Show debuted on October 7, 1974. The show was written by Gary Salisbury and was only scheduled to run Monday through Friday during the Winter season in the Wagon Camp Theatre. The show was so popular that by the end of the first seven months it was scheduled every day, and night shows were added in the evening during the summer months.

== Notable people ==
Mic Rodgers (Mel Gibson's stunt double), John Casino (Kurt Russell's stunt double), Keith Tellez (Dustin Hoffman's stunt double, Fast & Furious), Bob Elmore (John Candy's stunt double), Carl Ciarfalio (The Whole Ten Yards), Merritt Yohnka (stuntman on Nash Bridges), Ray Gabriel (Baywatch, Magnolia, Bob Hoskins' stunt double), Jim Poslof, Bob Rochelle, Bob Stambaugh, John Agnew, Terry Jackson, Robert Shook, Davey Thompson (Multiplicity, Absolute Power, Spider-Man 3, Ed Harris' stunt double), and Stephen Burhoe (1st & Ten, The Tonight Show with Jay Leno, acting coach).

On opening day the cast included Mic Rodgers and Carl Ciarfalio, two of the performers mentioned above. On October 7, 2004 the Wild West Stunt Show turned 30 years old and became the most successful and longest-running in-house produced show in amusement park history. The original Wild West Stunt Show was retired in 2005, replaced with a new stunt show entitled "Fool's Gold." The new show is still referred to by Knott's Berry Farm as the Wild West Stunt Show. Fool’s Gold ran for several years before it was once again replaced by “Frontier Feats of Wonder” in 2015. Frontier Feats of Wonder had a script and story overlay and a new version of the show was released in 2017.

A partial list of other members of the team over the years includes: Ken Clark, Karen Goldfuss, Richard Goldfuss, Allen Gilman, Paul Townsend, Tim Henderson, John Hyatt, Mel Hampton, Paul Ortiz, Steve Pape, Darren Scallion, Robert Leonard, Dane Jessie, Dave Bowman, Robyne Miller, Steve Rizzo, Tyler Dilts, P.J. Stover, Marc Shaffer, Vickie Hull, Dave Perkins, Jay Mead, Craig McAlpin, Allen Brock and Robert Matthew Baxter
