= List of haunted attractions =

This is a list of haunted attractions, which are live entertainment venues that simulate the experience of visiting haunted locations or storylines typical of horror fiction.

== Simulated haunted houses/mansions/castles ==
=== Year-round ===
Attraction	Location	Open Date	Source	Notes
The Haunted Mansion	Disneyland Resort Disneyland Park (New Orleans Square)	August 9, 1969		seminal attraction
The Haunted Mansion	Walt Disney World Magic Kingdom (Liberty Square)	October 1, 1971		
The Haunted Mansion	Tokyo Disneyland (Fantasyland)	April 15, 1983		
Phantom Manor	Disneyland Paris Disneyland Park (Frontierland)	April 12, 1992		
Mystic Manor	Hong Kong Disneyland (Mystic Point)	May 17, 2013		
The Twilight Zone Tower of Terror	Walt Disney World Hollywood Studios (Sunset Boulevard)	July 22, 1994		
The Twilight Zone Tower of Terror	Walt Disney Studios Park (Production Courtyard)	December 22, 2007		
Tower of Terror	Tokyo DisneySea (American Waterfront)	September 22, 2006		
The London Bridge Experience	London, United Kingdom	February 12, 2008		UK's Best Year round attraction 12 years
Ripley's Haunted Adventure	Gatlinburg, Tennessee	1999		
Ripley's Haunted Adventure	Myrtle Beach, South Carolina	2001		
Ripley's Haunted Adventure	San Antonio, Texas	March 22, 2002		
Ripley's Haunted Adventure	Pattaya, Thailand	October 30, 2004		
Dr. Frankenstein's Haunted Castle	Indiana Beach	1983		
Boo Blasters on Boo Hill	Carowinds (Crosswinds)	March 27, 2010		
Boo Blasters on Boo Hill	Kings Dominion (Planet Snoopy)	April 2, 2010		
Boo Blasters on Boo Hill	Kings Island (International Street)	April 17, 2010		
Boo Blasters on Boo Hill	Canada's Wonderland (Planet Snoopy)	May 2, 2010		
Spook-a-Rama	Deno's Wonder Wheel Amusement Park	1955		
Mysterious Mansion	Gatlinburg, Tennessee	1980		
Ghost Castle	Europa-Park	1982		
Duel - The Haunted House Strikes Back!	Alton Towers	1992		redesigned 2003
Trimper's Haunted House	Trimper's Rides	1964		expanded 1988
Haunted Mansion	Knoebels Amusement Resort	1973		3 minute dark ride
Spookslot	Efteling	1978		animatronic show
Geister Rikscha	Phantasialand	1981		dark ride themed to Chinese mythology
Mystery Castle	Phantasialand	1998		drop tower with a haunted-castle-like queue line
Geisterschloss	Wiener Prater	1955		
Ghost Train	Blackpool Pleasure Beach	1930		first ghost train

=== Seasonal ===
Attraction	Location	Open Date	Source	Notes
Edge of Hell	Kansas City, Missouri	1975		
Nightmare on 13th Haunted House	Salt Lake City, Utah	1990		permanent location run seasonally
Hundred Acres Manor Haunted House	Pittsburgh, Pennsylvania	2003		replaced Phantoms in the Park at same location
Terror Behind the Walls	Eastern State Penitentiary	1995		
Shocktoberfest	Reading, Pennsylvania	1990		
The Haunted Hotel	San Diego, California	1993		
Headless Horseman Hayrides	Kingston, New York	1992		includes 5 haunted houses, corn maze & hayride
Cutting Edge Haunted House	Fort Worth, Texas	1991		
Spider Hill	Three Sisters Park, Illinois	1997		
Spook Hollow	Marquette Heights, Illinois	1979		
The ScareHouse	Etna, Pennsylvania	1999		
The Thirteenth Hour Haunted Attraction	Indianapolis, Indiana	2017		Permanent location on 25 acres, operating for seasonal events
Erebus haunted attraction	Pontiac, Michigan	2000		Guinness World Record 2005~2009
Everhaunt Haunted Attraction	Angola, New York	2018		includes 10 different Halloween attractions.
Circle of Ash haunted attraction	Central City, IA	2000		formerly Frightmare Forest
Netherworld Haunted House	Norcross, GA	1997		
Pure Terror Screampark	Monroe, New York	2010		2015 Guinness World Record Holder; Longest Outdoor Haunted Attraction
The Terrortorium	Oxford, Alabama	2010		formerly the "Haunted Castle" dark ride at Miracle Strip Amusement Park in Panama City Beach, Florida.
The Nevermore Haunt	Baltimore, MD	2016		An historically themed attraction featuring sideshow performers
Shattered Screams Haunt	Jefferson City, Missouri	2019		Formerly known as 13th Door Haunted House, located in Beaverton, Oregon from 2002 to 2018 due to K-Mart closing.
The Darkness Haunted House	St. Louis, Missouri	1993		
13th Gate Haunted House	Baton Rouge, Louisiana	2002		

== Haunted amusement park attractions ==
Attraction	Location	Open Date	Source	Notes
Halloween Horror Nights	Universal Studios Florida	October 25, 1991		largest single event worldwide
Halloween Horror Nights	Universal Studios Hollywood	October 9, 1997		two earlier attempts not listed (see Article)
Halloween Horror Nights	Universal Studios Singapore	October 2011		now feature local Singaporean legends
Halloween Horror Nights	Universal Studios Japan	September 14, 2012		currently the longest run at 59 days in 2015
Six Flags Fright Fest	Six Flags Over Texas	1988		
Six Flags Fright Fest	Six Flags Great America	1991		
Six Flags Fright Fest	Six Flags St. Louis	1988		
Six Flags Fright Fest	Six Flags Magic Mountain	1993		
Six Flags Fright Fest	Six Flags New England	2000		
Six Flags Fright Fest	Six Flags Over Georgia	1987		
Six Flags Fright Fest	Six Flags Great Adventure	1992		
Six Flags Fright Fest	Six Flags Fiesta Texas	1996		
Six Flags Fright Fest	Six Flags America	1999		
Six Flags Fright Fest	Six Flags Discovery Kingdom	1999		
Six Flags Fright Fest	Six Flags Mexico	2012		
Six Flags Fright Fest	Six Flags Great Escape	1999		
Six Flags Fright Fest	La Ronde	2002		
Six Flags Fright Fest	Hurricane Harbor Oaxtepec	2023		
Howl-O-Scream & Halloween Spooktacular	Busch Gardens Tampa Bay	1999		
Howl-O-Scream & Halloween Spooktacular	Busch Gardens Williamsburg	1999		
Howl-O-Scream & Halloween Spooktacular	Sea World San Antonio	2008		
Howl-O-Scream & Halloween Spooktacular	Sea World Orlando	2008		
Howl-O-Scream & Halloween Spooktacular	Sea World San Diego	2008		
FrightFest	Elitch Gardens Theme Park	1999		
Fright Nights	Warner Bros Movie World	2006		
Knott's Scary Farm	Knotts Berry Farm	October 26, 1973		
Fright Nights	Thorpe Park	2002		
Mickey's Halloween Party	Disneyland	2005		
Mickey's Not-So-Scary Halloween Party	Walt Disney World, Magic Kingdom	1995		
Mickey's Not-So-Scary Halloween Party	Disneyland Paris Resort	2008		
SCarowinds	Carowinds	2000		
HalloWeekends	Cedar Point	1997		
Halloween Haunt	California's Great America	2008		
Halloween Haunt	Canada's Wonderland	2005		originally Fearfest
Halloween Haunt	Dorney Park & Wildwater Kingdom	1998		originally HalloWeekends
Halloween Haunt	Kings Dominion	2001		originally Fearfest
Halloween Haunt	Kings Island	2000		originally Fearfest
Halloween Haunt	Worlds of Fun	1999		
Halloween Haunt	Valleyfair	2006		previously HalloWeekends, 1998 to 2000
Ocean Park Halloween Bash	Ocean Park Hong Kong	2001		
Scarefest	Alton Towers	2007		Staffordshire, England
Hersheypark in the Dark	Hersheypark	1980		began as "Creatures of the Night" at neighboring ZooAmerica
Halloween in Europa-Park	Europa-Park	1998		
Halloween Horror Festival	Movie Park Germany	1996		largest Halloween event in Europe
Halloween Nights	Toverland			
Schaurige Altweibernächte	Erlebnispark Tripsdrill	2014		
Halloween Fright Nights	Holiday Park			
DINOWEEN	Holiday Park			
Halloween Belantis	Belantis			
Halloween Weeks	Legoland Deutschland Resort			
Horrornächte	Filmpark Babelsberg			
Familien-Halloween	Eifelpark			
Halloween Open Air Horror Maze	Eifelpark			
Halloween Party	Freizeitpark Plohn			
Fort Fear Horrorland	Fort Fun Abenteuerland	2009		
Happy Halloween	Fantasiana Erlebnispark Strasswaldchen			
Happy Halloween	Skyline Park			
Halloween auf Schloss Thurn	Erlebnispark Schloss Thurn			
Klotti's schaurige Tage	Wild- und Freizeitpark Klotten			
Filippos verfluchte Zauberwelt	Familypark			
Höllowum Fegefeuer der Sorgenkobolde	Die geheime Welt von Turisede			
Halloween in Wiener Prater	Wiener Prater			
Shocktober Fest	Tulleys Farm	1997		

== Defunct attractions ==
Attraction	Location	Open Date	Closed Date	Source	Notes
Geisterschloß	Wiener Prater	1933	1945		Year-round; destroyed in WW2
Schloss Schreckenstein	Phantasialand	1972	2008		Year-round
Haunted Castle	Six Flags Great Adventure	1978	1984		Opened in 1978 as Haunted House, then upgraded in the next year as Haunted Castle; destroyed by fire on May 11, 1984.
Baron William's Mystery Hall	Europa-Park	1991	2007		Year-round
Frightmare Forest	Cedar Rapids, Iowa	2000	2009		Seasonal; became Circle of Ash, Central City, IA
Fright Nights	Six Flags Astroworld	1986	2005		Haunted theme park attractions; later renamed Six Flags Fright Fest in 1993
Fright Fest	Darien Lake	1998	2015		Haunted theme park attractions; replaced by Harvest Fest in 2016
