= Trimper =

Trimper is a surname. Notable people with the surname include:

- Perry Trimper, Canadian politician
- Steve Trimper, American baseball coach
- Tim Trimper (born 1958), Canadian ice hockey player

== See also ==
- Trimper's Rides
- Trimper's Haunted House
