= Montañez =

Montañez is a Spanish surname. Notable people with the surname include:

- Andy Montañez (born 1942), Puerto Rican singer and songwriter
- Beatriz Montañez (born 1977), Spanish TV presenter and actress
- Cindy Montañez (born 1974), American politician
- Lou Montañez (born 1981), Puerto Rican baseball player
- Pedro Montañez (1914–1996), Puerto Rican boxer
- Polo Montañez (1955–2002), Cuban singer and songwriter
- Raphael Montañez Ortiz (born 1934), American artist and educator
- Richard Montañez (born c. 1958), American businessman, motivational speaker and author
- Virginia Montanez, American writer, essayist, author and columnist
- Willie Montañez (born 1948), Puerto Rican baseball player
