= The Haunted Hotel (San Diego) =

Annual attraction in San Diego, California

- Location: San Diego, California, U.S.
- Status: Operating
- Opened: 1993
- Operated by: Robert Bruce; Greg DeFatta
- Theme: Horror
- Operating season: Halloween
- Website: hauntedhotel.com

The Haunted Hotel is an annual haunted attraction in San Diego, California, United States. It opened in 1993 and is the longest running haunted attraction in the city. It was originally located in Downtown San Diego before relocating to nearby Mission Valley. The attraction has been featured in Reader's Digest and on the Travel Channel.

== History ==
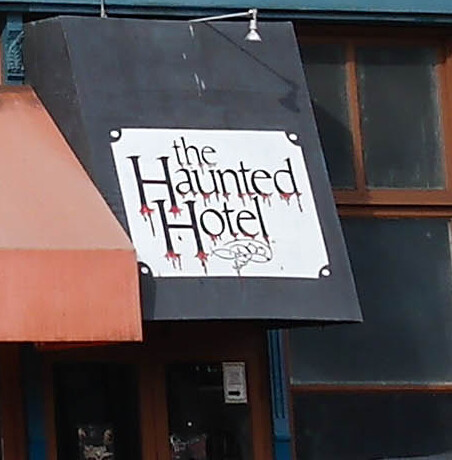
The attraction's former location in the Gaslamp district.

Greg DeFatta and Robert Bruce co-own and operate the attraction. The original venue was in the basement of the Broker's Building at 424 Market Street in the Gaslamp Quarter, San Diego.

It first opened in 1993, and in 2019, it was relocated to 1640 Camino Del Rio North at the Westfield Mission Valley parking lot. It was branded as The Disturbance with three mazes that expanded to 10,000 square feet.

In 2012, the attraction was open off season for San Diego Comic Con. During the COVID-19 pandemic in 2020, the attraction was experimented as a drive-thru haunt.

The attraction was featured on America's Scariest Haunts on the Travel Channel.

== Attractions ==
In 2012, it featured attractions like the Hellavator, and influences from The Texas Chain Saw Massacre and Shutter Island. Clown Subway was part of the attraction in 2017. In 2018, the attraction featured Mutant Mine Shaft, Morgue Autopsy Lab, and Hillbilly Swamp.

=== The Haunted Hotel Disturbance ===
After relocating to Mission Valley in 2019, the attraction was rebranded as The Haunted Hotel Disturbance and split into three mazes: "Haunt Collective," "Kill-Billy Chaos," and "3D Freak Fest."

=== Frightmare on Market Street ===
Located nearby in the Gaslamp district, DeFatta and Bruce also started Frightmare on Market Street, an annual eight room haunted attraction at 530 Market Street. In 2000, the attraction made use in 3-D.

== Reception ==
In 2008, Haunt World Magazine said it was one of the "top 13 haunts in the nation." In a review from 2010, Aida Bagdasaryan at UCSD Guardian wrote it to be a humorous attraction for ages 17 and up. In a 2016 review, Amanda Cooper at San Diego Entertainer Magazine wrote the walkthrough was too short and that it didn't live up to the hype for being a "top rated haunted house." Clown Subway at the attraction was named the "Best Haunted Room in America" in 2017. In 2018, Reader's Digest called it one of the "15 Best Haunted Houses in America." In 2019, America Haunts listed it on their "5 Most Entertaining Haunted Attractions in the U.S."
