= The ScareHouse =

Haunted attraction in Pittsburgh, Pennsylvania

ScareHouse
- The ScareHouse logo
- Interactive map of ScareHouse
- Location: Pittsburgh, Pennsylvania
- Coordinates: 40.499211°N 79.944018°W
- Opened: 1999
- Owner: Scott and Wayne Simmons
- Theme: Halloween
- Operating season: Fall
- Website: Official website

ScareHouse presents haunted attraction and other events in Pittsburgh, Pennsylvania.

In 2013 CBS News called ScareHouse "One of America's Scariest Haunted Houses". ScareHouse received additional recognition from Guillermo del Toro who stated "It really is beautiful. With the sound design and the atmospherics, it is beautiful. I could live here!" and Michael Dougherty who stated: "I left so happy and inspired. You guys nailed it!" In 2010 the ScareHouse was rated as one of "The 10 Wickedest Haunted Houses In America" by Forbes Magazine, and in 2012 was rated #5 in the US in Top Haunt Magazine's Top 13 Haunts. The ScareHouse offers heavily themed attractions or "haunts" which are significantly revised on a yearly basis along with an interactive, immersive, 18 and over attraction titled "The Basement".

== ScareHouse History ==
The first production of ScareHouse was presented in 1999. It is owned by Scott and Wayne Simmons. Creative Director Scott Simmons has been in the haunt industry for more than twenty years, having started with local non-profit haunts and various fundraisers. In 1985 he volunteered at a YMCA haunted house while in high school. During the 1980s and 1990s Scott worked within a few non-profit events and his father Wayne created and constructed the more elaborate sets and projects. ScareHouse occupied two different spaces, one in 1999 off of McKnight Road north of Pittsburgh, and one in Etna, in 2003 before moving to the former Elk's lodge in 2007 on Locust Street in Etna.

On August 30, 2024, Undead Productions, the parent company of ScareHouse, filed for Chapter 11 bankruptcy protection. ScareHouse announced that they would not be returning to Pittsburgh Mills for the 2024 Halloween season, but hopes to return the following year.

== History of the Previous Location ==
ScareHouse was previously located at 118 Locust Street in Etna, Pennsylvania. ScareHouse has integrated the historical foundations and fabrics of this building into the haunt design through utilizing existing structures (walls and the original stage) in the haunt layout. The building once provided an employee recreational facility for the Spang and Chalfont Company before being bought by the Etna Elks No. 932. Etna Lodge No. 932 spent over 75 years at 118 Locust Street. There are still many reminders of the Elks Lodge No. 932 throughout the building, such as antique chairs and tables.

== Partnership with Legendary Entertainment ==
ScareHouse and Legendary Entertainment began collaborating in 2013, making ScareHouse one of the few independent haunted attractions outside of an amusement park to incorporate Intellectual property. Thomas Tull, the chief executive officer of Legendary Pictures has reportedly been a fan of ScareHouse for a number of years, and began working with ScareHouse after a return visit with Guillermo del Toro and Michael Dougherty in 2013. The following year the character "Sam" from the movie Trick 'r Treat was incorporated into the ScareHouse attraction "The Summoning" followed by two attractions in 2015 based on the Legendary films Trick 'r Treat and Krampus named "Trick 'r Treat: Hallowed Grounds" and "Krampus: Come all ye fearfull"

== Previous Themes ==
=== The Sunset Lodge 2017 -2018 ===
A group of savage serial killers took over the run down Sunset Lodge. The scenes are various tacky hotel rooms, including a honeymoon suite with heart shaped bed.

=== Nocturnia 2016 -2018 ===
Nocturnia is a terrifying tale of wild creatures, twisted illusions, and a final circus of shadows. This haunt was updated to a 3-D haunt in 2017. It is filled with circus performers, clowns, and other creatures.

=== Infernal 2016 -2018 ===
A collection of cursed artifacts from the darkest corners of the world released a legion of demons from the deepest depths of Hell.

=== The Basement 2013-2019, 2024 ===
The Basement is not a traditional linear walk through haunted attraction, rather it is an interactive and immersive R-rated experience that involves the actors speaking to and challenging guests. The Basement is designed to provide boundary pushing, intense, thrilling, and emotional experiences in a safe environment. The event is restricted to only one or two guests entering at a time. It is a more intense and thrilling experience with adult content and explicit language. The Basement has also presented additional productions during Christmas, Valentine's Day, and the summer. The Basement is marketed and geared towards those who seek a more extreme experience. Everyone must be 18 years old and sign a waiver before entry. Elijah Wood attended the attraction in 2014 and "raved" about ScareHouse and the Basement on the Seth Meyers show on November 5.

The Basement has received national attention due to the boundary pushing nature of the experience and utilization of social and psychological principles. In 2014 and 2015 the Basement attraction was a site for data collection through the University of Pittsburgh. Researchers collected psychophysiological data from guests who volunteered to participate in the research study designed to gather data during intense, "real world" emotional experiences. The research protocol was a result of investigations into the science of fear by sociologist Margee Kerr, a former ScareHouse consultant

=== Retired Haunts ===
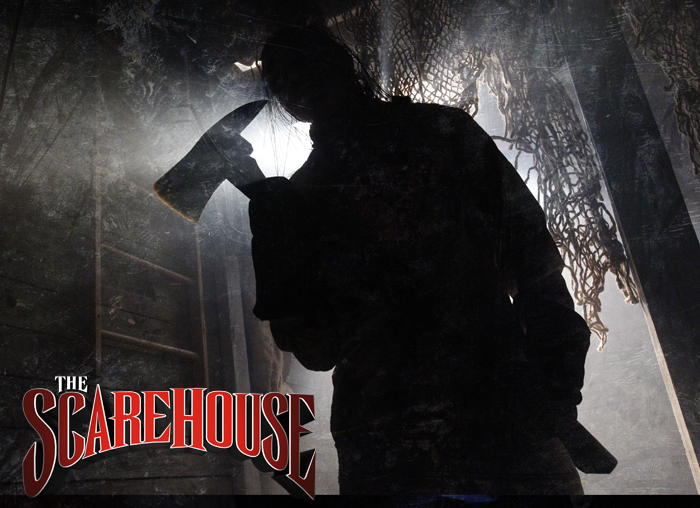
Buttercup

==== Hall of Nightmares 2007–2009 ====
The Hall of Nightmares was an assortment of highly detailed scenes and characters that was primarily influenced by EC comics such as Tales From The Crypt, Italian horror movies such as Suspiria, the Haunted mansion at Disney and traditional haunted house situations and scenarios. The designers utilized vibrant colors and stylized scenic design to create a series of thinly connected and surreal scenes involving creatures, clowns, and cloaked figures.

==== Screamatorium 2007–2008 ====
Screamatorium opened in 2007 and was much darker, realistic, and intense than Hall of Nightmares. This attraction was set inside an abandoned research facility dating back to the early 1900s, which was filled with mutated creatures and their helpless victims. The design team took heavy influence from films such as Silent Hill to create a series of medically themed labs, offices, and holding cells lit by flickering incandescent bulbs.

==== Delirium 3-D 2008–2011 ====
Delirium 3-D first opened in 2008. Guests were given 3-D glasses at the entrance of the haunt to experience the many 3-D effects of the sets. Delirium 3-D took guests into the deranged and demented world of the main character "Delirium", which was filled with fluorescent colors, loud music, puppets, and twisted creatures. The general theme was inspired by a mix of psyho/punk/pop/rave culture. The characters in this haunt were known for their random, confusing, though entertaining sayings and antics. In 2012 the ScareHouse hosted musical artist Delirium Dog, who heavily inspired and took inspiration from the Delirium haunt. Delirium Dog performed live in the haunt during the 2011 season.

==== Rampage! 2009–2010 ====
Rampage! was heavily influenced by steampunk, a subgenre of fantasy and science-fiction that attracted a growing fan base of alternative artists. The term denotes works set in an alternative Victorian era of culture and technology where steam power is still the predominant form of energy. The ScareHouse designers studied reference photos and technical drawings to find inspiration for new costumes, sets, and other production elements.

Rampage! took customers into a world divided by war; on the one side were the 'rebels' who were fighting against the evil 'Die-Rector' and 'Daphnie'. These two characters were featured heavily in ScareHouse ads and promotions. The Die-Rector gained further recognition in 2010 when he was invited to participate in 'Dancing with the Celebrities of Pittsburgh .'

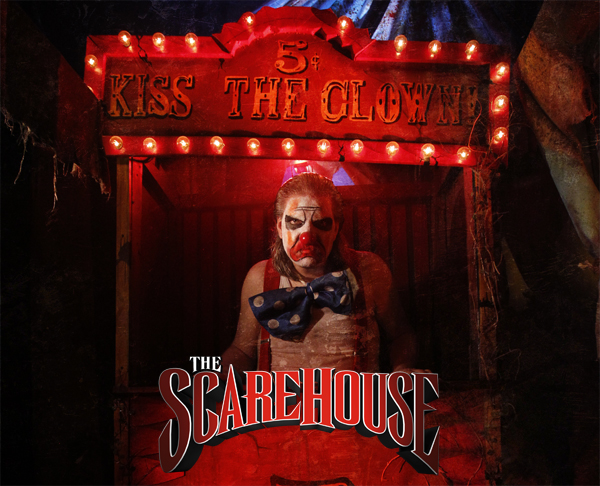
Creepo the Clown

==== The Forsaken 2009–2012 ====
The Forsaken opened in 2009 to replace 'Hall of NightMares.' The Forsaken is set in a mythical town of citizens that have lost their souls and are condemned to stalk and haunt the town. Sets include a broken down and haunted Carnival, complete with demented clowns, roustabouts, and fairway barkers. Other notable sets include a highly detailed and realistic 'game' room and 'butcher' shop complete with stuffed prey and animal carcasses.

The Forsaken introduced the character of 'Creepo,' a murderous clown that became known for taunting and interacting with customers. This character proved so popular that the ScareHouse developed a new haunt, Creepo's Christmas in 3-D, around him as a clown turned Santa Claus.

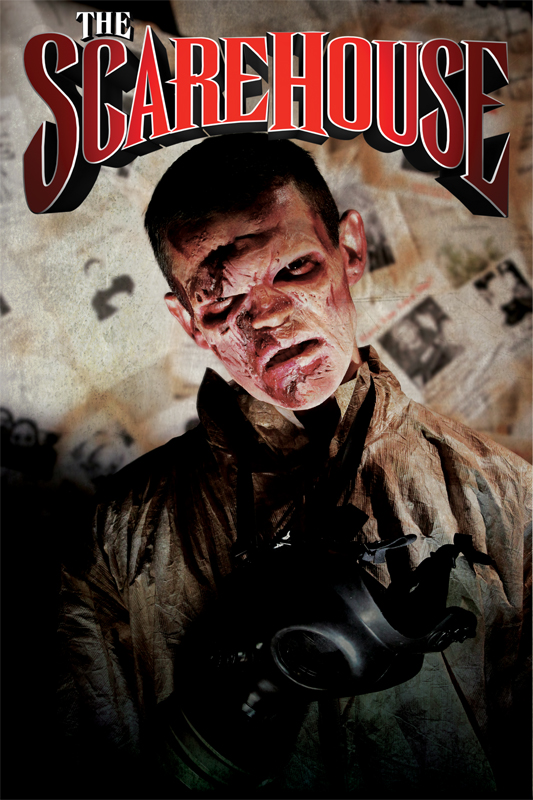
Infected Zombie

==== Pittsburgh Zombies 2011–2014 ====
Pittsburgh Zombies opened as the third haunt within The ScareHouse in 2011. The Pittsburgh Zombies attraction features elaborate and Hollywood-quality recreations of iconic Pittsburgh landmarks, while actors portray legions of the walking dead. An experienced team of set designers and scenic artists worked to create a real-life version of the zombie apocalypse that has been so memorably and frighteningly portrayed by the series of Night of the Living Dead films shot in and around the Pittsburgh area over the last forty years. Notable Pittsburgh Zombies sets include a crashed incline cable car, a recreation of Primanti's Brothers restaurant, and a lab where the outbreak started named 'UPEC'.

==== Creepo's Christmas in 3D 2012-2014 ====
Creepo's Christmas debuts in 2012 as the newest 3-D haunt. This haunt is built around the character of Creepo, the demented clown from The Forsaken. This experience places guests in a 'creepy' and twisted Christmas town where Creepo, wearing a Santa cap, seethes over early Christmas decorations. According to Scott Simmons, owner and creative director of The ScareHouse, part of the inspiration for this genre came from the ever earlier appearance of Christmas wares in retail stores. Simmons states: "Once the retail stores started displaying Christmas decorations in October, Creepo the Clown decided it was time to take a stand for Halloween."

==== Pittsburgh Zombies: Black Out! 2014 ====
ScareHouse's expanded tribute to Pittsburgh's Living Dead Legacy surrounds guests with hordes of the hungry dead. The lights are going out and the zombies are getting in.

=== Trick 'r Treat: Hallowed Grounds 2015-2015 ===
The Trick 'r Treat attraction is inspired by the Trick 'r Treat film and "Season's Greetings" both by writer and director Michael Dougherty. The attraction is built as a life-size pop up book entirely in black and white. Guests walk through series of rooms themed around rules of halloween including: 1) always wear a costume 2) pass out treats 3) never blow out a jack-o-lantern and 4) always check your candy. This highly artistic attraction utilizes visible luminescent paints which are black light reactive, further creating a realistic feeling pop-up book.

=== Krampus 2015 - 2015 ===
The Krampus attraction is based on the film by Michael Dougherty which was released in 2015. ScareHouse's team of scenic and special effects artists collaborated with Michael Dougherty and Legendary Entertainment to bring many of Krampus' characters to life inside the attraction. The attraction contains recreations of the evil snowmen, gingerbread cookies, Jack-in-the Box, and the Krampus monster. To further promote the film in advance of release, and to give guests a behind the scene look into the characters, Legendary commissioned a small gallery inside the attraction which featured the actual props, costumes, and practical creatures from the special effects company Weta Workshop The attraction also served as the location for film promotion interviews between Michael Dougherty, Krampus actor David Koechner, a variety of press outlets.

=== The Summoning 2013-2016 ===
The Summoning attraction was introduced in 2013. The attraction is set in the 1930s and based on a secret society called "the Arcana" which is an inspired reimagining of the Elk's fraternal order that occupied the building for 70 years. Further building from the history of the Elk's, many of the scenes are recreation of rooms which existed during their residence; including a game room, large theater, bar, parlor, and lounge. The rooms are all fully themed with time-period appropriate sets and a full cast of actors portraying "sinister" characters.

== Community Involvement ==
While The ScareHouse is a for-profit, commercial venture it is still heavily involved in the Pittsburgh community. The ScareHouse contributes to multiple charitable organizations, and frequently collaborates with socially active bloggers, businesses, and causes. The Crazy Scary event, held in both 2010 and 2011, contributed more than $12,000 local kids in need. The Crazy Scary fundraiser benefits two local fundraising drives, Make Room for Kids and Christmas Crazy for Kids.

Make Room for Kids is a social media-driven fundraising effort originated by local blogger Virginia Montanez from That's Church (also known as "PittGirl" ) designed to bring gaming and laptops to sick children at Children's Hospital of Pittsburgh, in association with The Mario Lemieux Foundation. Christmas Crazy for Kids was created by local blogger Michelle Hammons of the blog Burgh Baby. Donated funds are used to purchase and deliver toys to Toys for Tots and HOPE center ScareHouse additionally partners with the local restaurant Burgatory to sell the "ScareHouse Shake" with a portion of the proceeds going to the Make Room For Kids foundation. As of 2017, 32,000 shakes have been sold. The ScareHouse has also partnered with St. Jude Children's Research Hospital, Etna Economic Development Corporation, Haitian Families First, and the Delta Foundation.

In 2013 ScareHouse was a sponsor of the Great American Water Balloon Fight which is dedicated to fighting global poverty.

== ScareHouse PodCast ==
The ScareHouse podcast started broadcasting on iTunes in May 2011. While many of the podcasts are related to haunted houses and the haunted industry, they also cover topics like social media and marketing, dating in Pittsburgh, Anthrocon, sound and design, and paranormal activity. The podcasts are heavily focused on personal narrative and investigating the intersections of the haunted industry and society at large.

== ScareHouse and The Ghost Hunters ==
The ScareHouse has brought the members of the Ghost Hunters team Amy Bruni, Steve Gonsalves, Kris Williams, Dave Tango, and Adam Berry to Pittsburgh five times, 2007, 2008, 2009, and 2010, 2011. Amy Bruni returned to ScareHouse in 2014 to hold a private paranormal investigation, and The ScareHouse Podcast from March 27, 2012, features an in-depth interview with the former Ghost Hunter.
