= Edge of Hell (Kansas City) =

Haunted house attraction in Missouri, U.S.

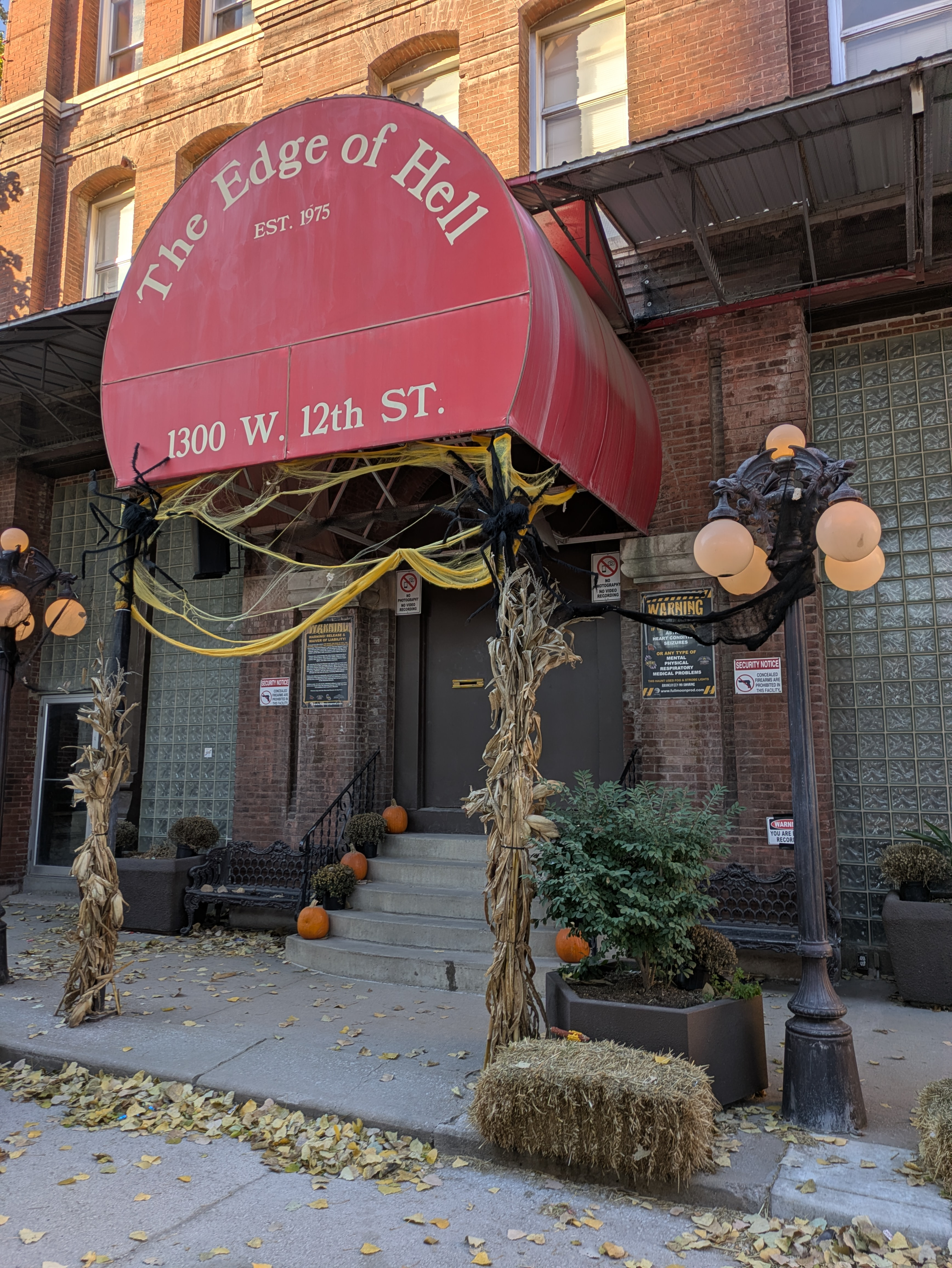
- Main entrance in November 2025
- Interactive map of Edge of Hell
- Location: Kansas City, Missouri
- Coordinates: 39.10103°N 94.6000°W
- Status: Operating
- Opened: 1975
- Operating season: Fall
- Website: www.edgeofhell.com

Edge of Hell is an American haunted house attraction located in the West Bottoms district of Kansas City, Missouri. It has been in operation since 1975, and is the longest-running operating commercial haunted attraction in the United States.

== History ==
The Edge of Hell first opened in 1975 by Full Moon Productions, operated by Monty Summers and his family. The attraction originally opened in the River Market area of Kansas City before relocating to Seventh and Wyandotte in the downtown area. In 1988, the attraction moved to a warehouse building over a century old in the West Bottoms district. It remains operated by Full Moon Productions and operates within a complex in the West Bottoms that also features The Beast and Macabre Cinema.

== Attraction ==
The Edge of Hell's experience is themed as a sequential journey through purgatory, heaven, and into hell. Many of the scenes focus on phobia-based thematic elements, which include claustrophobic spaces and rooms engineered for sensory effects, such as a vortex tunnel, pitch-black mazes, and a physical descent from the attraction's high point via a five-story spiral slide themed as a fall from heaven to hell. The attraction also features live animals in several scenes, including live rats and a "Rat Man" character.

The attraction also features Medusa, a reticulated python. Guinness World Records measured Medusa at 25 feet 2 inches (7.67 m) on October 12, 2011, listing her as the longest captive snake ever recorded; the attraction reports that she has grown since that measurement.

== Reception and awards ==
In 2012, HauntWorld listed Edge of Hell together with The Beast (which is also in Kansas City and operated by the same company) as 10th in its list of top 13 best Haunted Houses in America.

The Travel Channel listed the Edge of Hell in its feature on America's Scariest Halloween Attractions.
