= Hundred Acres Manor Haunted House =

Haunted attraction in Pittsburgh, Pennsylvania

- Interactive map of Hundred Acres Manor Haunted House
- Location: 1 Hundred Acre Dr South Park Township, Pennsylvania, United States
- Opened: 2003
- Slogan: Forget what you know about fear.
- Operating season: September–November
- Website: Official website

Hundred Acres Manor Haunted House is a haunted attraction in the South Hills of Pittsburgh, Pennsylvania. It opened in 2003 on the former location of an earlier haunt called Phantoms in The Park. The main building and surrounding area originally housed a pool and community hall. Hundred Acres Manor is a charity haunted house. Profits go to Animal Friends and The Homeless Children's Education Fund.
