= Circle of Ash haunted attraction =

Haunted attraction near Central City, Iowa

Circle of Ash
- Interactive map of Circle of Ash
- Location: Linn County Fairgrounds 201 Central City Rd, Central City, IA
- Coordinates: 42.195385°N 91.5296307°W
- Opened: 2000
- Theme: Halloween
- Operating season: Fall
- Website: Official website

Circle of Ash Haunted Attraction is a haunted attraction near Central City, Iowa, which runs seasonally for Halloween. It was opened in 2000 as Canfield's Frightmare Forest. It grew from a small haunted trail to a 5-acre (20,000 m^{2}) event. It moved from its original location in a botanical preserve to an unused warehouse, and subsequently to its present location at the Linn County Fairgrounds.

== History ==
Frightmare Forest was a haunted trail attraction located to the northeast of Cedar Rapids, Iowa, which ran seasonally for Halloween. It was opened in 2000 by Chad Canfield as Canfield's Frightmare Forest, subsequently becoming an LLC run by an organized group of members. It was held in an actual forest, part of Rock Island State Botanical Preserve, on Preserve Lane near Cedar Rapids. It grew from a small haunted trail to a 5-acre (20,000 m^{2}) event. In 2009, all of the Frightmare Forest organization's property was packed up and moved to a warehouse at 412 7th Ave SE, in Cedar Rapids, becoming the Circle of Ash Haunted Attraction. Since then, it grew to produce multiple productions per year, including on Valentine's Day Weekend, Independence Day Weekend, and Halloween season in 2011.

In 2015, the attraction went dark for a year, returning in 2016 at its current location at the Linn County Fairgrounds.

As of 2017, Circle of Ash has resurrected the Frightmare Forest name, and applied it to one of their haunted attractions at the fairgrounds. The attractions include an outdoor haunted trail: Frightmare Forest, an indoor haunted house: Circle of Ash, and a fog filled clown maze: Socko's Fun House, as well as laser tag and VR style games.

== Attractions ==
This spine-chilling attraction offers three distinct nightmares in one terrifying location. Step inside The Manor, a classic indoor haunted house where creaking floors, dark secrets, and restless spirits await around every corner. Then venture into the shadowy woods of Frightmare Forest, an outdoor trail where the trees whisper warnings and the path itself seems to shift beneath your feet. Finally, get lost in Socko's Fun House—a twisted, clown-infested maze designed to disorient and delight. While some in the haunt industry consider mazes and haunted houses interchangeable, the creators of this attraction promise each experience offers its own brand of horror. Together, they form a fearsome trifecta for thrill-seekers brave enough to face them all.
