= Spook Hollow =

Haunted attraction in Marquette Heights, Illinois

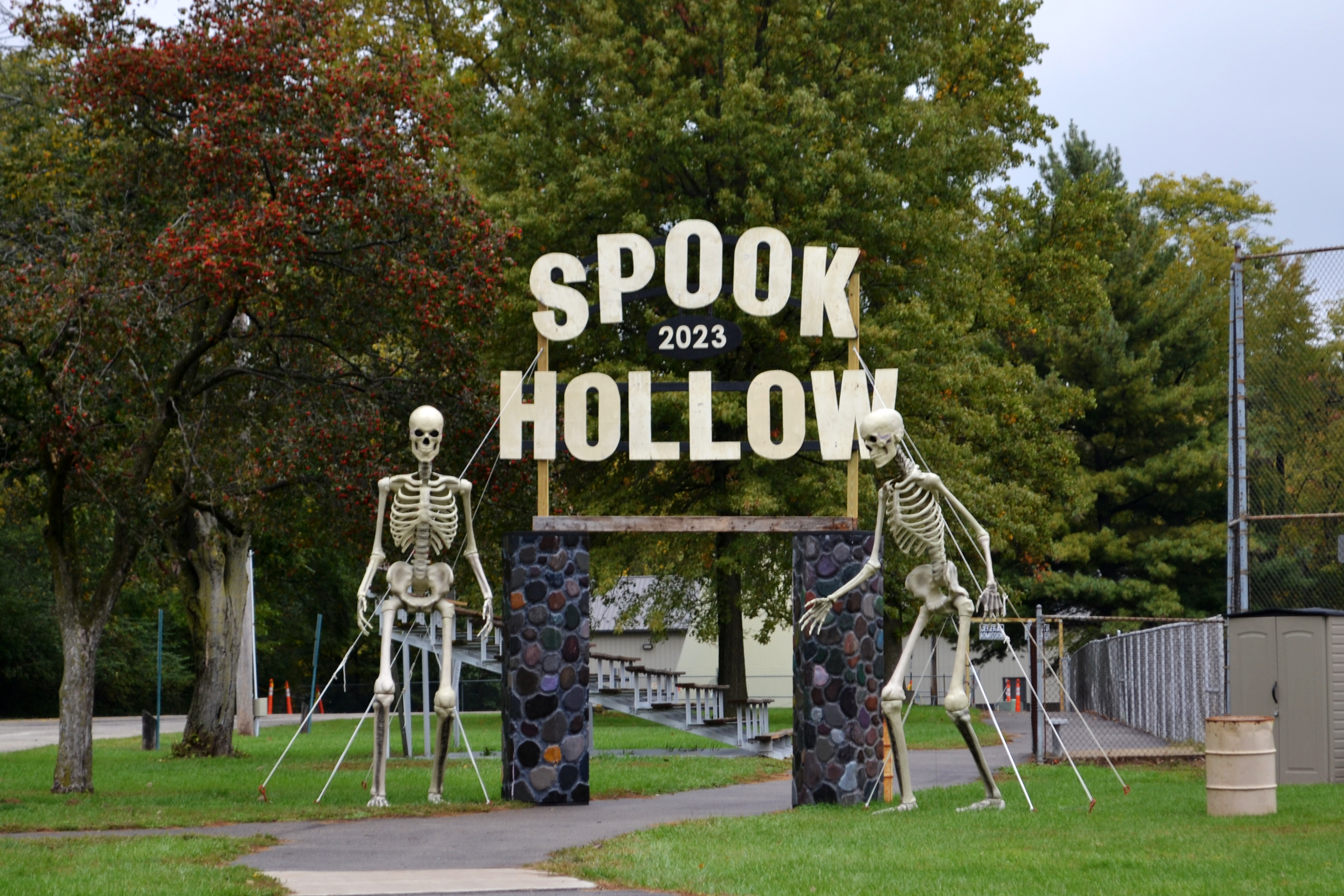
- Entrance to Spook Hollow, October 2023
- Status: Active
- Genre: Haunted event
- Date: Last 3 Friday/Saturday in October (Never on Halloween)
- Frequency: Annually, October
- Venue: Independence Park, 613 Lasalle Blvd, Marquette Heights, IL 61554
- Location: Marquette Heights, Illinois
- Coordinates: 40°37′23.36″N 89°35′59.41″W
- Country: United States
- Inaugurated: 1979
- Founder: Marquette Heights Men’s Club (MHMC)
- Attendance: More than 10,000 per year
- Filing status: 501(c)3 not-for-profit agency (EIN 47-4469639)
- Website: spook-hollow.com

Spook Hollow is an annual haunted event held at Marquette Heights, Illinois to celebrate Halloween. The six day event runs the last three weekends of October.

The 2026 season will be the first time in history that Spook Hollow is open for seven nights. The haunt has no plans to ever be open on Halloween as it is a family holiday and should be spent with them.

== History ==
Spook Hollow began in October 1979. WCBU reported that Spook Hollow started as a free activity for employees laid off from Caterpillar. The Peoria Journal Star reported that it was initially called "Spooky Hollow", a post-Little League activity on a woodsy path near the baseball fields.

It is hosted by the Marquette Heights Men's Club of Central Illinois (MHMCCI), a not-for-profit group. All funds raised from the event are donated back to the community, such as local police, fire departments, local scout groups, city library, food pantries, and scholarships. The group estimates it invests between $50,000 and $100,000 per year back into the community.

In 2017, the group donated a Ford Utility Police Interceptor SUV to the Marquette Heights police department. The SUV features the Spook Hollow logo as a decal on its hood and rear. At the time, the $44,352 donation was the largest single donation the men's club had ever done.

The event runs for six nights during the last three weekends of October. Ticket gates are open from 6:30pm to 11pm, but the event remains open until the "until the last person makes it through". The event has approximately 200 volunteers including actors, makeup artists, and support staff. The event draws over 10,000 people each year.

The event was cancelled to the public in 2020 due to the COVID-19 pandemic, but resumed in 2021. The site opened for approximately 13 minutes privately to continue the streak of "longest running outdoor haunted attraction".

== Attractions ==
Spook Hollow claims to be the longest running "Outdoor Haunted Attraction" in Illinois. The event is not recommended for children under 13, but staff will allow all ages to enter. Participants gain access to all three events for one admission price. Attractions change yearly with different themes, details, props, and layouts, but the overall event structure of the manor, trail, and industrial factory have remained the same. The tour takes about an hour. As of 2023, general admission is $30 and a speed pass is available for $45.

=== M.C. Manor ===
The narrative for this attraction is that an old man named Montgomery Crescent, or M.C., lives in a rundown mansion. M.C. is named after the Men's Club.

=== Spook Hollow Trail ===
A haunted trail attraction loops through the woods of Independence Park.

=== M.C. Nightmare ===
This industrial themed haunt was added in 2013. Independence Park is the site of an old coal mine, and the narrative of the attraction weaves in the name of the real historic Crescent Coal Company.

== Awards ==
- Scare Factor 2010 - Must-See Haunts, #2 in Illinois
- Scare Factor 2017 - #13 in the U.S.
- Haunted Illinois 2018 - Top Ten Haunted House
- Haunted Illinois 2021 - #3 Top Ten Haunted House
- Haunted Illinois 2021 - Top Ten Halloween Event
- “Level 2” certification - Illinois Ghost Seekers Society
- ICONIC (Platinum) HAA Top Haunts 2026 - Haunted Attraction Association
