= The Darkness (haunted house) =

Haunted house attraction in Missouri

- Interactive map of The Darkness
- Location: St. Louis, Missouri
- Coordinates: 38.6121°N 90.1999°W
- Website: https://www.thedarkness.com/

The Darkness is a haunted house attraction located in St Louis, Missouri, owned by Larry Kirchner, who has a long history of operating haunted houses in the St. Louis area. The Darkness opened in 1994. The place has been considered one of the scariest haunted houses in America.

== Reception ==
According to Lisa Morton, the attraction is praised for its Hollywood-quality special effects, and in 2013 the site Haunted World listed the Darkness as number 2 in the list of best haunted houses of all time. America Haunts, a national association of haunted attractions, praised the Darkness and assigned it legendary status.

== History ==
As of 2023, it is currently on its 30th year of operation. The Darkness first started life in the old Welch Baby Carriage Factory in downtown St. Louis (Soulard area). After ten years their original building was sold to be developed into apartments; the owners of The Darkness bought the building next door. After buying their current location, they expanded the building to add another 10,000 square feet and added Terror Visions 3D, Horror Gift Store, and an actors' area on the bottom floor. In 2017, the owners of The Darkness bought another building next door to The Darkness and opened St. Louis Escape. St. Louis Escape features 7 escape rooms, including Jurassic Island, Frankenstein, Dracula, Cellar, Blackbeard's Curse, Wonderful Wizard of Oz, and Haunted Hotel. In 2020, St. Louis Escape added a 1980s-themed blacklight mini golf called Retro Golf.

The Darkness and St. Louis Escape are two of St. Louis' top tourist attractions. The owners of The Darkness helped bring the National Haunted House and Halloween Tradeshow to St. Louis 13 years ago (Transworld). The Darkness and St. Louis Escape are open for haunt/escape owner/operators each year, offering behind-the-scenes tours. The Darkness has been featured by virtually every YouTuber and national reality show, from Grim Life Collective, Carpetbagger to reality shows like Shipping Wars, Travel Channel specials to Boulet Brothers' Dragula, Ghost Adventures, Modern Marvels, MythBusters, and more.

Many national celebrities have visited the Darkness, including Miley Ray Cyrus, WWE wrestlers China, Hardy Boys, Peyton Manning of the NFL, Robert Englund, Elvira, Gunner "Leatherface" Hanson, Bobby Boris Picket, Kane "Jason" Hodder, Todd Gurley (NFL), Kathrine Webb, Scott Bakula, Sara Karloff, and many more.

In 2025, The Darkness underwent a massive renovation, replacing the older Terror Visions Haunted House with a new, scarier maze. The Darkness also built a secret horror bar as a VIP experience, expanded their horror retail store, and built several new scenes. Next door to The Darkness is the world-famous St. Louis Escape with eight escape rooms, retro mini golf, and a pinball arcade. St. Louis Escape added two new escape rooms in 2025: Alien Encounter and Haunted Mansion.
