= Broker's Building =

Historic building in San Diego, California, U.S.

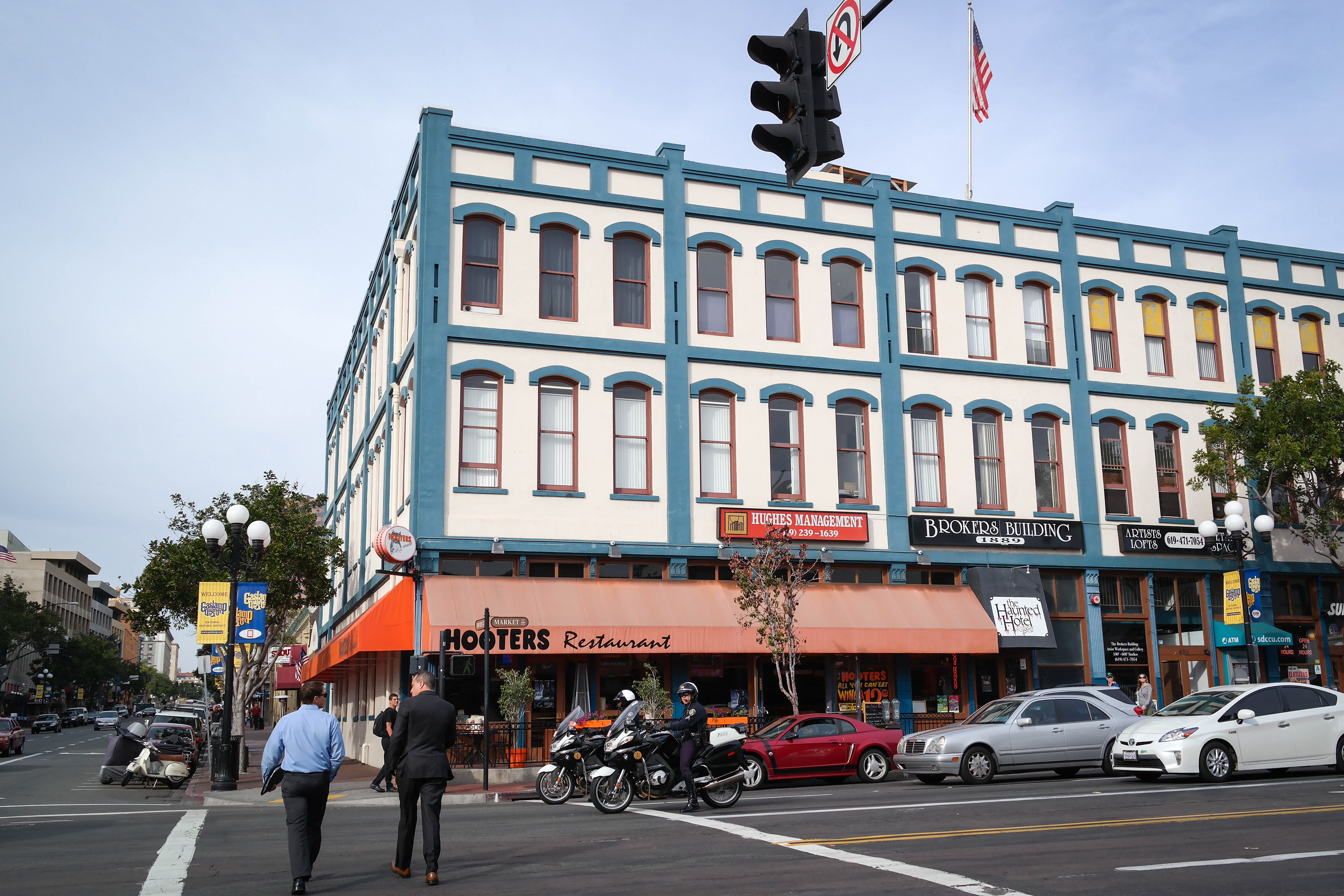
- The building in 2014
- Interactive map of the Broker's Building area

General information
- Location: 404 Market Street, San Diego, California, United States
- Coordinates: 32.711667°N 117.160892°W

The Broker's Building is an historic structure located at 404 Market Street in the Gaslamp Quarter, San Diego, in the U.S. state of California. It was built in 1889 by Barnett McDougal.

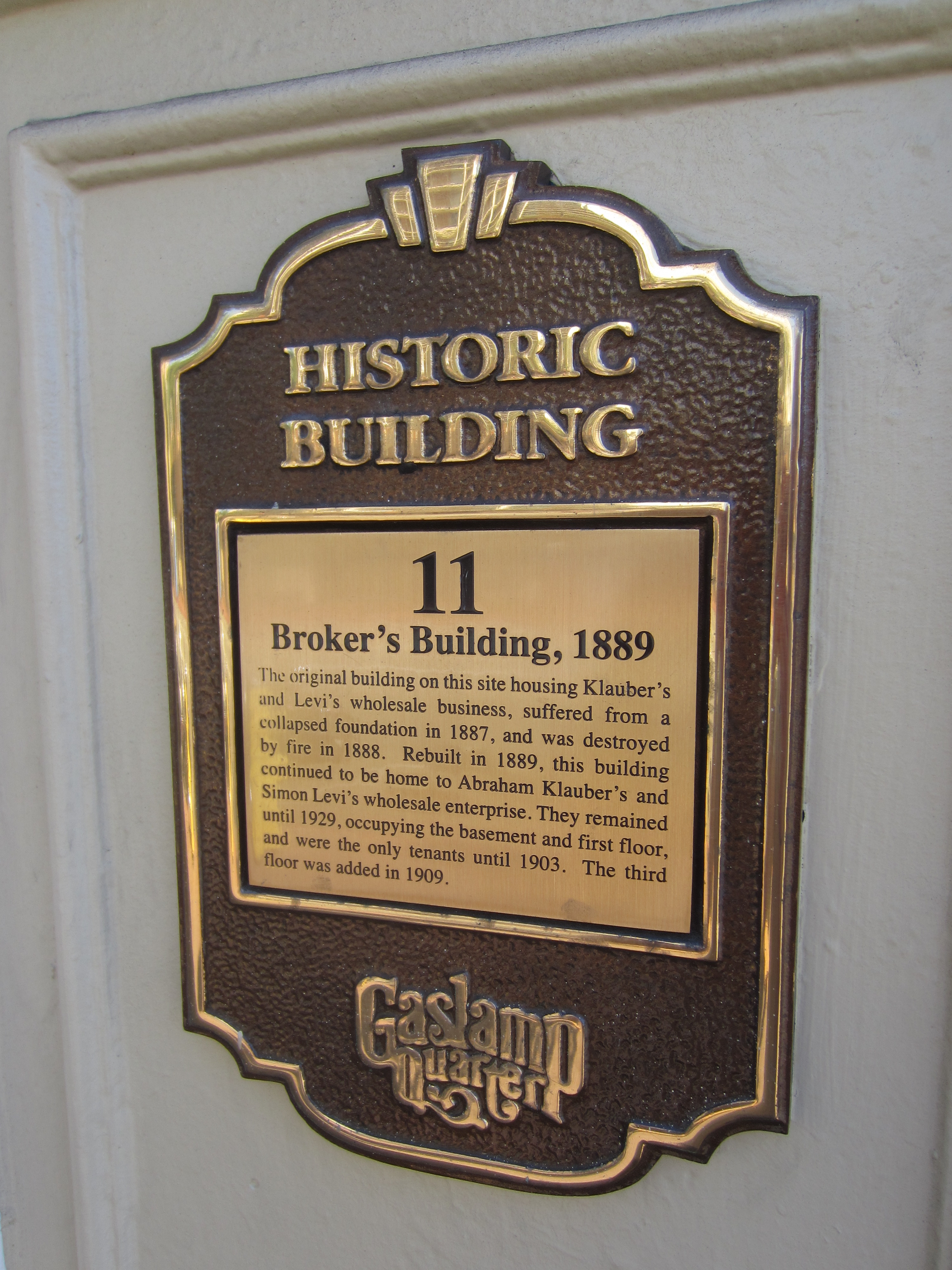
Plaque for the building, 2016

== See also ==
- List of Gaslamp Quarter historic buildings
