= Tulleys Farm =

Farm and scream park in West Sussex, England

Coordinates: 51.105147°N 0.101899°W

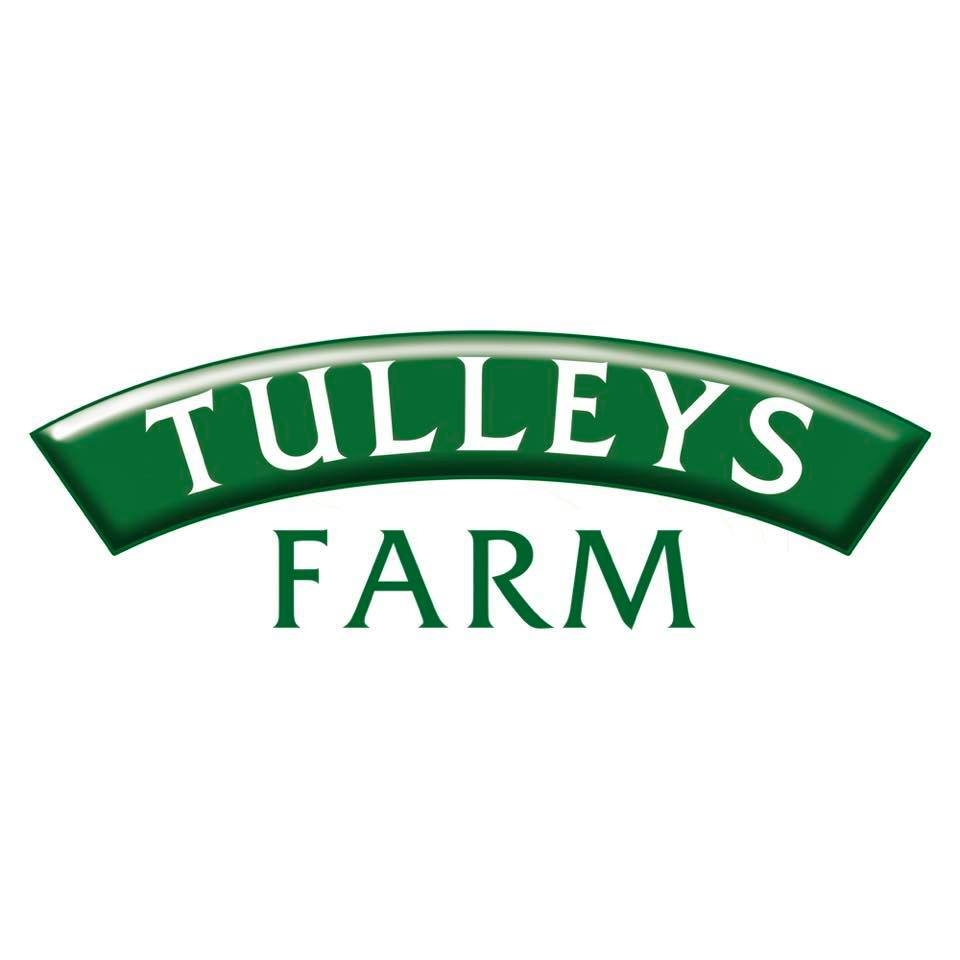

- Location within West Sussex
- OS grid reference: TQ 32983 35696
- Shire county: West Sussex
- Region: South East
- Country: England
- Sovereign state: United Kingdom
- Post town: Crawley
- Postcode district: RH10
- Website: www.tulleysfarm.com

Tulleys Farm is a family-run farm and visitor attraction near Turners Hill, West Sussex, England. The Beare family has farmed at Worth Hall Farm since 1937. Originally focused on agriculture and farm retail, the business later diversified into seasonal events and leisure attractions, including Shocktober Fest, the Tulleys Pumpkin Festival, Tulleys Tulip Fest and Tulleys Escape.

== History ==
Bernard Beare, originally from Devon, began farming in 1911 and settled at Worth Hall Farm in West Sussex in 1937. The farm initially operated as a dairy farm and also produced salad crops and vegetables.

In 1972, Bernard's son Denis Beare and his wife Marion developed the farm's pick-your-own operation. By 2004, the farm was producing 35 varieties of fruit, vegetables and salad crops across approximately 120 acres.

Stuart, Marion & Sam Beare

Stuart Beare joined the family business in 1991. A farm shop opened in 1992, followed by a tearoom in 1996. Over the following years, the business gradually diversified from conventional agriculture and farm retail into visitor attractions and seasonal events. By 2004, these included maize mazes, pumpkin festivals and Halloween activities.

In 2014, Tulleys closed its farm shop and discontinued its traditional pick-your-own operation as it increasingly concentrated on events and pumpkin growing.

During the COVID-19 pandemic, Tulleys opened a drive-through farm shop in March 2020, allowing customers to purchase groceries while minimising contact with staff. Later that year, the farm introduced a drive-in cinema using its existing car park.

The farm later expanded its visitor attractions to include Tulleys Escape and developed tulip festivals at additional locations in England.

The farm also appeared in a 2024 episode of Ant and Dec's Saturday Night Takeaway.

== Events ==
=== Shocktober Fest ===
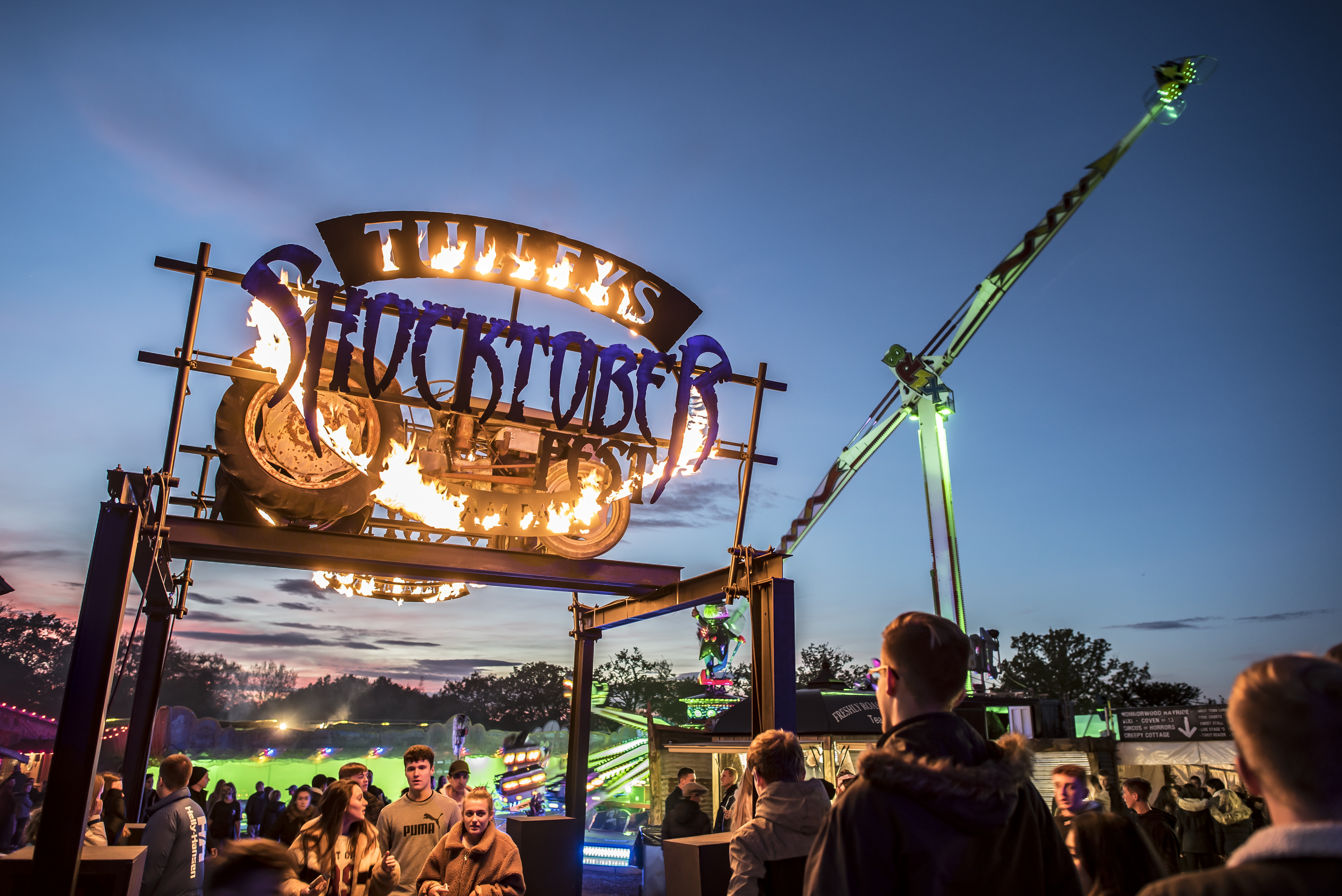
Shocktober Fest

Shocktober Fest is an annual Halloween event at Tulleys Farm that developed from the farm's early pumpkin and Halloween activities. According to Stuart Beare, the farm introduced its first haunted house in 1996, with the event subsequently expanding into a larger Halloween attraction.

The event expanded during the 2000s, with the Haunted Hayride introduced in 2003. According to ScareTOUR, it attracted more than 15,000 visitors that year. By 2014, Shocktober Fest had developed into a month-long event featuring seven haunted attractions and rides. In 2017, BBC News reported that approximately 80,000 visitors were expected to attend.

Shocktober Fest has been billed in regional media coverage as Europe's largest scream park. In 2026, the event marked its 30th anniversary, commemorating the development of Tulleys' Halloween attractions.

=== Pumpkin Festival and Pumpkin Nights ===
The Tulleys Pumpkin Festival developed from the farm's agricultural and pick-your-own activities into a seasonal autumn event. It has been described in media coverage as Europe's largest pumpkin festival.

Tulleys Pumpkin Festival

For the 2026 season, Tulleys reported that the festival covered more than 100 acres and featured over 1.5 million pumpkins and gourds representing more than 100 varieties. In September 2026, the festival expanded with the opening of Pumpkin Valley, a newly landscaped area within the existing site.

Tulleys also operates Pumpkin Nights, a separately ticketed evening event held on selected dates during the autumn season. The event features illuminated pumpkin displays and serves as an evening counterpart to the daytime Pumpkin Festival.

=== Tulip Festival ===
Tulleys introduced its first Tulip Fest at its West Sussex farm in spring 2024. The inaugural event featured approximately 500,000 tulips across around 100 varieties. By 2025, organisers reported planting approximately 1.5 million tulip bulbs at the Sussex site, a figure also reported for the 2026 season.

The tulip festival concept expanded beyond West Sussex in 2025. Tulleys Tulip Fields opened on land adjacent to Willows Activity Farm near London Colney, Hertfordshire, while Tulleys Tulip Garden opened at Hatton Country World near Warwick, Warwickshire. Both locations hosted a second season in 2026. The Hertfordshire site expanded to more than 750,000 tulip bulbs, while the Warwickshire garden was expected to feature approximately 750,000 tulips, compared with around 500,000 in 2025.

=== Christmas events ===
Tulleys operates a daytime Christmas Experience, which predates its Christmas Light Festival. The Christmas Experience was held at the farm by 2022 and includes a visit to Father Christmas and other seasonal activities. The separate evening Christmas Light Festival was introduced in November 2024, featuring illuminated outdoor displays and light installations. The festival returned for a second season in 2025, with additional installations. That year, organisers reported that the event featured more than 30 million lights and a sound system comprising approximately 500 speakers.

== Tulleys Escape ==
Tulleys Escape is an escape room attraction operating throughout the year at Tulleys Farm. It was operating by 2017, when its rooms included Mutiny and The Outfitters. The attraction subsequently expanded. By March 2019, three escape rooms were operating, with a fourth under development.

== Awards and recognition ==
In 2004, Stuart Beare received the Farm Retailer of the Year award at the NFU Farming Excellence Awards for his work in developing Tulleys Farm's retail operations.

At the 2024 Sussex Business Awards, Tulleys Farm received the Business Growth Award and was named Company of the Year.

In September 2026, Shocktober Fest received the Gold award in the inaugural Scream Park of the Year category at the UK Theme Park Awards.

In November 2026, Tulleys Farm received two awards at the Lloyds British Business Excellence Awards: the Lloyds Leading SME Business of the Year Award and the Gerald Edelman Family Business of the Year Award.
