= Nightmare on 13th Haunted House =

- Nightmare on 13th logo
- Interactive map of Nightmare on 13th Haunted House
- Location: Salt Lake City, Utah, U.S.
- Coordinates: 40.7415648°N 111.9018419°W
- Opened: 1990
- Operated by: Mike Henrie
- Theme: Halloween
- Slogan: Utah's Legendary Haunted Attraction
- Operating season: Fall
- Website: Official website

Nightmare on 13th is a haunted house in Salt Lake City, Utah. It is one of the largest and longest-running haunted attractions in the United States and is considered one of the best and scariest in the city. Nightmare on 13th is also the only haunted house in Utah that has three haunted attractions as well as a kid/family-friendly option. As of 2026, they have been in business for 36 years. More than 1.6 million people have visited this haunted house.

Nightmare on 13th has a 2nd attraction, the Institute of Terror. This attraction is only available with Combo Tickets or VIP Level Tickets.

New as of 2026, Nightmare on 13th now has a 3rd attraction called 13th Manor. This is a seated, live scare show that combines theatrical storytelling, interactive scares, and special effects.

Nightmare on 13th also operates Day Haunt: No Scares, All Atmosphere, a daytime version of the main haunted house designed for families, children, and guests who want to experience the attraction's sets and atmosphere without live scare actors. The experience is offered on select Saturdays during the Halloween season."

This haunted house also boasts the only Halloween attraction in Utah to have an event space and venue for rent. Nightmare on 13th has a 1,600 sq ft multi-purpose event space available for bookings year-round.

Nightmare on 13th has been voted one of America's scariest attractions by the Travel Channel.

The attraction has received national recognition in haunted-attraction rankings in USA Today's 2025 10Best Readers' Choice Awards, Nightmare on 13th ranked No. 9 among haunted house attractions in the United States.

Nightmare on 13th operates primarily during the Halloween season in September, October, and November, with occasional special events held outside the traditional fall season.

Nightmare on 13th is located at 320 West and 1300 South, it is in a 36,000-square-foot (3,300 m^{2}) castle, which was a former car dealership.

== History ==
The Nightmare on 13th was started by Klane Anderson in 1984 as The Institute of Terror. The Institute of Terror was sold to Troy Barber and Mike Henrie in 1990, as Klane was moving to Atlanta to help start a nuclear robotics division of Westinghouse. Early adoption of robotics and high-tech special effects by Klane Anderson were a big attraction of "The Institute of Terror."

In 1993, after three seasons, Mike and Troy decided that they wanted to do something that separated them from their competitors:

"In 1993 after three successful seasons the decision to put every dime into buying the building proved to be a wise move. By owning their building, Mike and Troy could spend all year working on the Haunted House. This enabled them to separate themselves from the competition."

By purchasing the building, it put them in a position to run the haunted house business full-time. This gave them a very strategic advantage over their competitors who ran their haunted houses on the side. In 1996, Troy and Mike decided that they would attend the Halloween, Costume and Party show which was hosted in Chicago. Once there, they learned some very valuable lessons that would make them more successful:

"Mike and Troy realized that they were underpriced nationally and that a raise in the price of admission could pay for a substantial investment in the show. They firmly believed that with each price increase should come a perceived higher value to the customer. That show opened their eyes to the possibilities before them."

After the 9/11 terrorist attacks, the company changed its name to the Nightmare on 13th in 2001.

Nightmare on 13th is a seasonal haunted house open in September, October, and November, but its creators work on it all year long to keep it fresh every year.

After you enter the haunted house there are over 45 different rooms you travel through which take approximately 25–40 minutes. The second attraction, Institute of Terror, takes about 15–20 minutes to go through.

The business environment for haunts in Utah is one of the most active in the United States. Nightmare on 13th is regularly part of the top tier of houses in Utah.

This haunted house was featured on the Travel Channel in 2009 and 2010 and was on the cover of Haunted Attraction Magazine in 2009.

As of 2016, approximately 120 people staff the haunt on any given evening. Employees get paid above minimum wage.
