= Trimper's Rides =

Amusement park in Ocean City, Maryland

Trimper Rides Of Ocean City
- Previously known as Trimper’s Rides, Windsor Resort
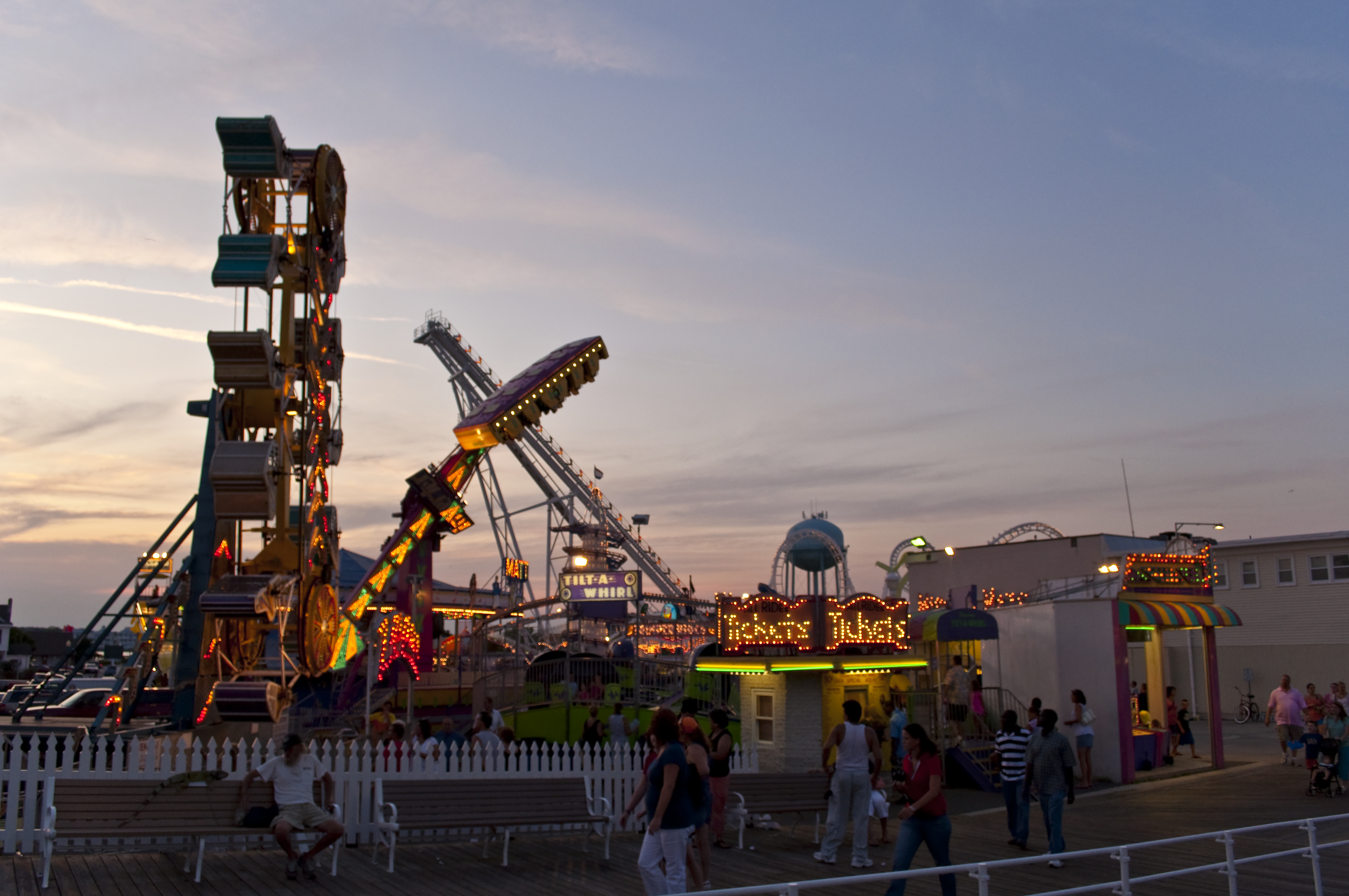
- Trimper Rides from the boardwalk
- Interactive map of Trimper Rides Of Ocean City
- Location: Ocean City, Maryland, Maryland, United States
- Coordinates: 38.3267°N 75.0880°W
- Opened: 1893
- Owner: Windsor Resorts
- Operating season: Early April-Mid September

Attractions
- Total: 28 (16 Outdoor Rides)
- Roller coasters: 2
- Water rides: 0
- Website: https://www.trimperrides.com/

Trimper Rides Of Ocean City is an amusement park located near the inlet at South First Street and the boardwalk in Ocean City, Maryland, United States. It was founded in 1893 as The Windsor Resort. It is located at the south end of the boardwalk and consists of three outdoor lots and an indoor section.

== History ==
Daniel B. Trimper and his wife, Margaret, arrived in Ocean City in 1890. By 1893, they were owners of boardwalk property between South Division and South First Streets, including two hotels: The Eastern Shore and the Sea Bright.

In 1900, the Trimpers rebuilt the Sea Bright after a severe storm had damaged the hotel; they modeled its new structure after Great Britain's Windsor Castle. The two hotels, together with a theater and an amusement park, became known as Windsor Resort.

In 1912, Daniel Trimper purchased a massive carousel from the Herschell-Spillman Company in North Tonawanda, NY. It was 50 feet (15.24 m.) in diameter, with the only other carousel made by the firm at that time having been sent to Coney Island, which was later destroyed in a fire.

The carousel's 45 animals, three chariots, and one rocking chair were driven by a steam engine, with rides originally costing a nickel. It is now classified as one of the oldest still-operating carousels in the nation. The carousel was declared a historic landmark in 2007.

In the 1950s, the Trimper family added outdoor rides. The pace of expansion has increased since the mid-1960s, with a new ride being added nearly every year.

Trimper's son, Daniel Jr., managed Windsor Resort Corporation after his father's death and served as mayor of Ocean City for 16 years. In 1964, Granville Trimper collaborated with Bill Tracy to create the Haunted House. In 1965, a WWII veteran, Daniel Trimper III, was handed leadership of the park and nearly doubled its size with the purchase of the land and attractions of Melvin Amusements. Five years later, John and Maria Bilious were hired to restore the cherished Herschell-Spillman Carousel to its former glory.

Dan Trimper III retired in 1981, passing the reigns to his cousin Granville Trimper. The most popular ride in the outdoor park was bought in 1985: the triple loop boomerang "Tidal Wave" roller coaster.

Trimper's Rides also operates an arcade on the boardwalk, Marty's Playland which has been open since the 1940s with a variety of new and classic games.

== Rides ==
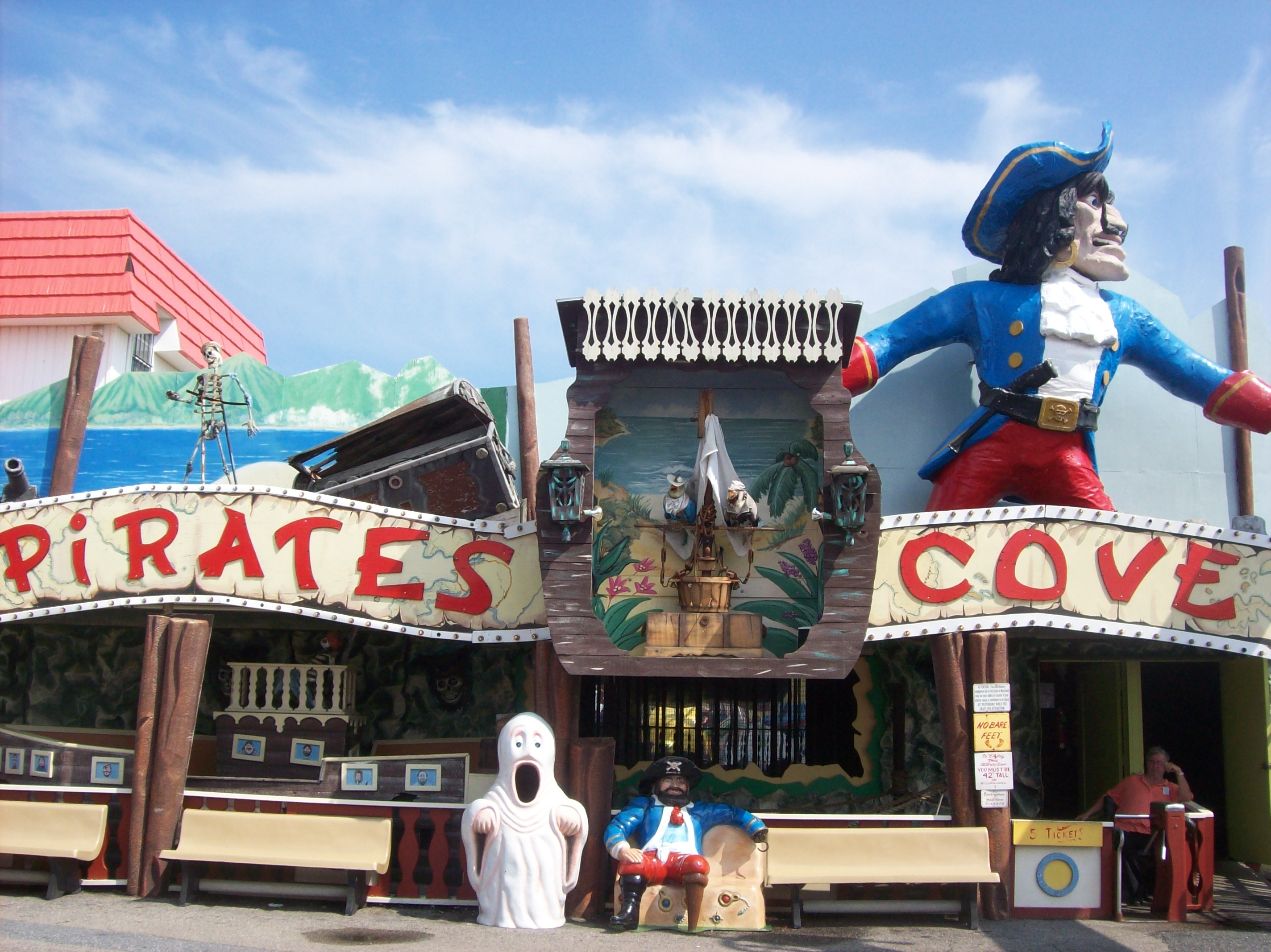
The Pirate's Cove Fun House is one of only two Bill Tracy built walk-through's left in the world.

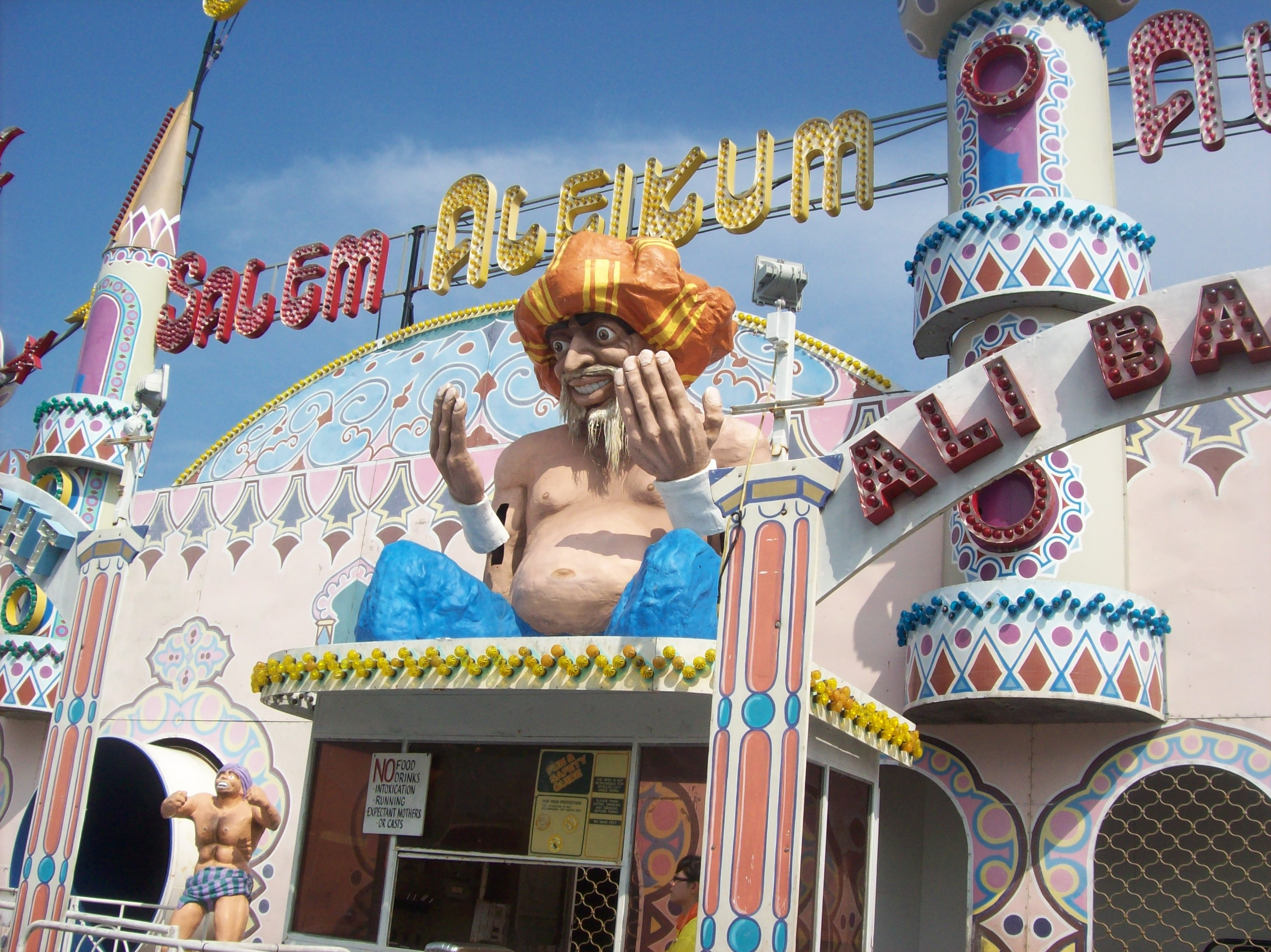
Aladin's Lamp is a small portable-style "fun house". It includes a number of floor tricks, a revolving turn-table and a spinning barrel. This ride was retired on January 10, 2018.

The Indoor Area contains rides aimed for young children. It contains a collection of vintage amusement park memorabilia and paraphernalia, ranging from antique ticket booths, to operating antique rides. The main attractions include a large collection of operating vintage William F. Mangels kiddie rides, a circa 1912 Herschell-Spillman Carousel, a bumper car ride, and a shooting gallery.

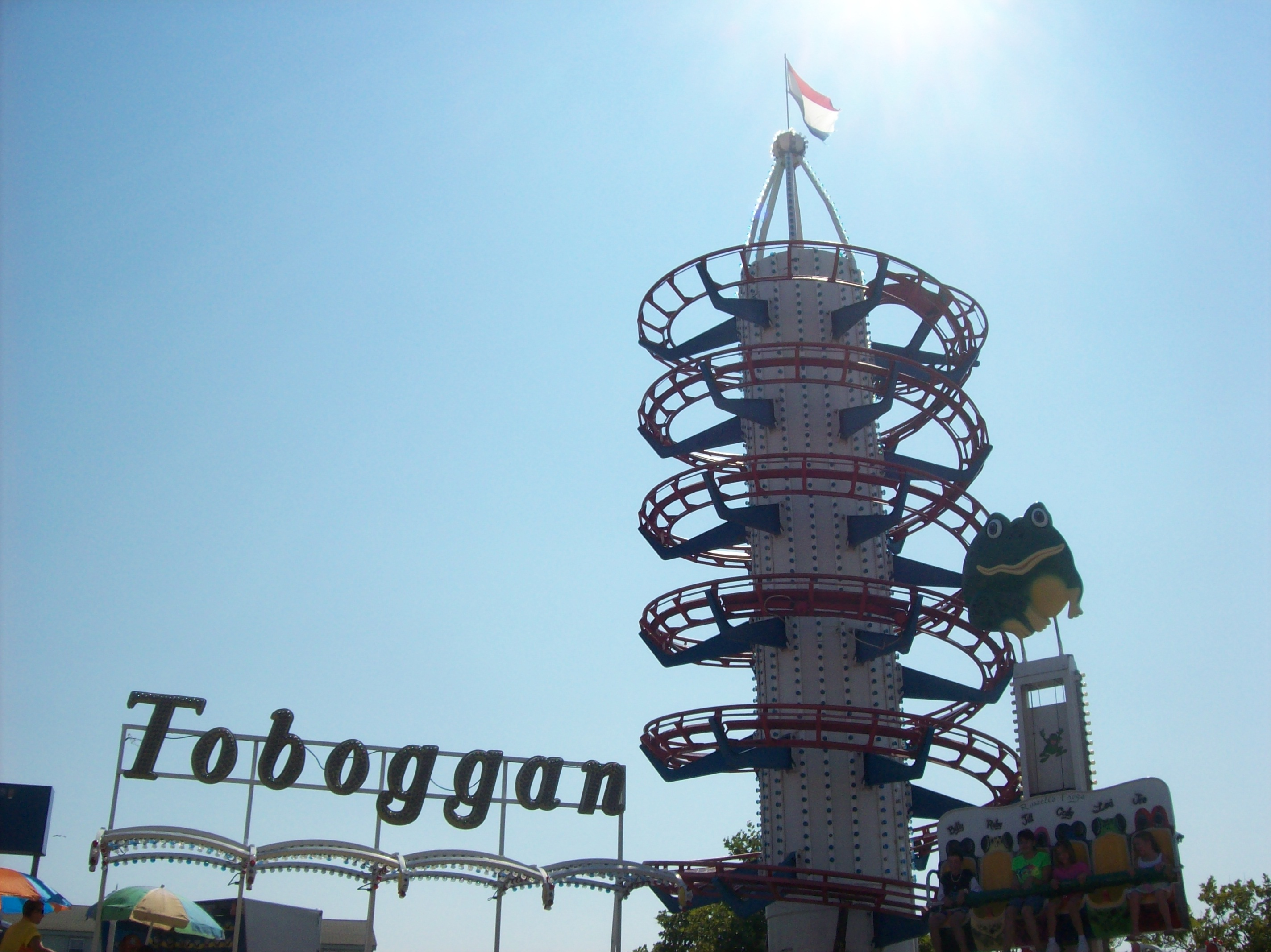
The Toboggan Roller Coaster, retired in Winter 2009.

The three outdoor areas are where most of the major rides are located.

- Balloons
- Endeavor
- Fun Slide
- Himalaya
- Rock N Roll
- Spinning Coaster
- Tea Cups
- "The Tidal Wave", a 126 ft (38 m) tall looping roller coaster
- Tilt A Whirl

Trimper Park also has 2 attractions:

- Mirror Maze
- "Pirate's Cove", built 1971, a Bill Tracy designed walk-through fun house; one of only two left in the world

=== Former rides ===
- Aladdin's Lamp (Retired, 2018)
- Crazy Cabs (2020)
- Daytona (2023)
- Freak Out (Retired 2019)
- Fun Slide (2020) A new one currently operates at the park.
- Hangten (2020)
- Inverter
- Kid's Ferris Wheel (2024)
- Rockstar (Retired 2019)
- Rock-O-Plane
- Rockin Tug
- Round Up (2020)
- Scrambler (Retired 2019)
- Slingshot (2007)
- Super Shot (2020)
- Tilt-A-Whirl (Retired 2019) A new one currently operates in the park.
- Toboggan (Retired 2009)
- Wacky Worm (Retired 2019)
- Wild Mouse
- Yo-Yo (2022)
- Zipper (Retired 2019)
