= Trimper's Haunted House =

Dark ride at Trimper's Rides in Ocean City, Maryland

The Haunted House
- Previously known as Trimper’s Haunted House
- Location: Ocean City, Maryland
- Opened: 1964
- Operating season: April-Late October

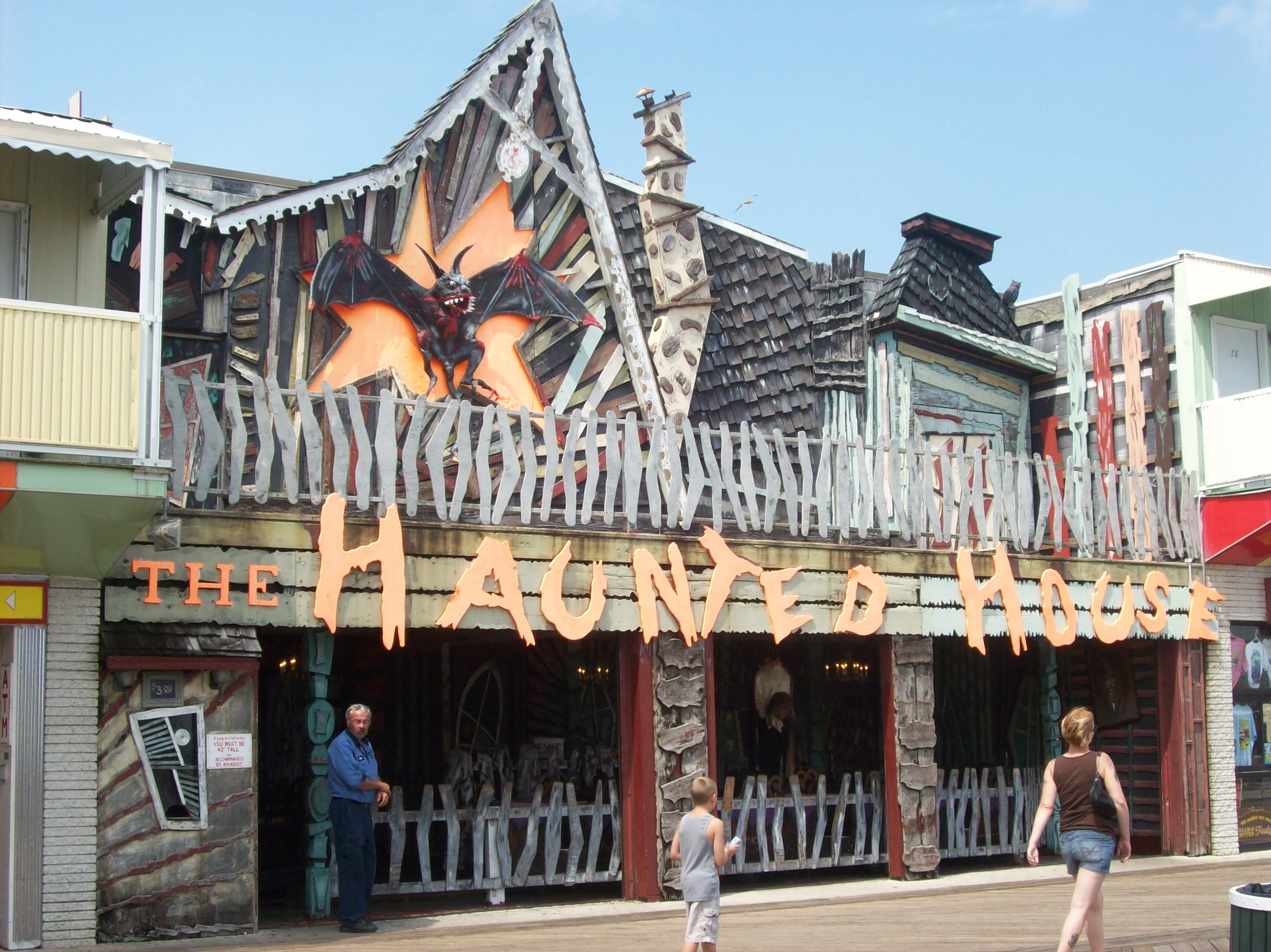
The Haunted House has been in place on the Ocean City Boardwalk since 1964.

The Haunted House is a dark ride in Ocean City, MD. Built by Bill Tracy in 1964, and expanded in 1988, it has resided on the southern end of Ocean City's boardwalk strip ever since.

== History ==
In 1961, Granville Trimper was intrigued by a dark ride at Glen Echo park near Washington DC. He attended an amusement convention not long afterward, where he met Bill Tracy (at the time, the best dark ride builder in the industry) and discussed building a dark ride on the site of the former Windsor Theater. After numerous proposals, Granville settled for the one-level "Haunted House" dark ride package. Construction began in 1963, and the ride was ready for the 1964 season.

The ride was a hit, and Granville added to his new dark ride whenever possible. During the 1988 season the ride was given a major overhaul, adding a second floor to accommodate gags and tricks from a ride called "Ghost Ship" at Playland Park, which had closed. The ship was a Tracy-built ride also, and the stunts fit in perfectly with the ones from 1964. The addition required an enlarged loading area (to make room for some extra cars) and added a balcony, which the cars would travel across during the trip.

In current years, the park has been gradually phasing out the Tracy tricks, which consist of wood, papier-mâché, and day-glow paint. This fragile building has led to numerous incidents, including being the target of vandalism, and constant repairs. The park has been adding newer, modern dark ride stunts to replace the older ones.

Trimper's Haunted House is open seven days a week during the summer months, and on weekends (Friday, Saturday, and Sunday) during the off-season.
