= Virginia Montanez =

American writer

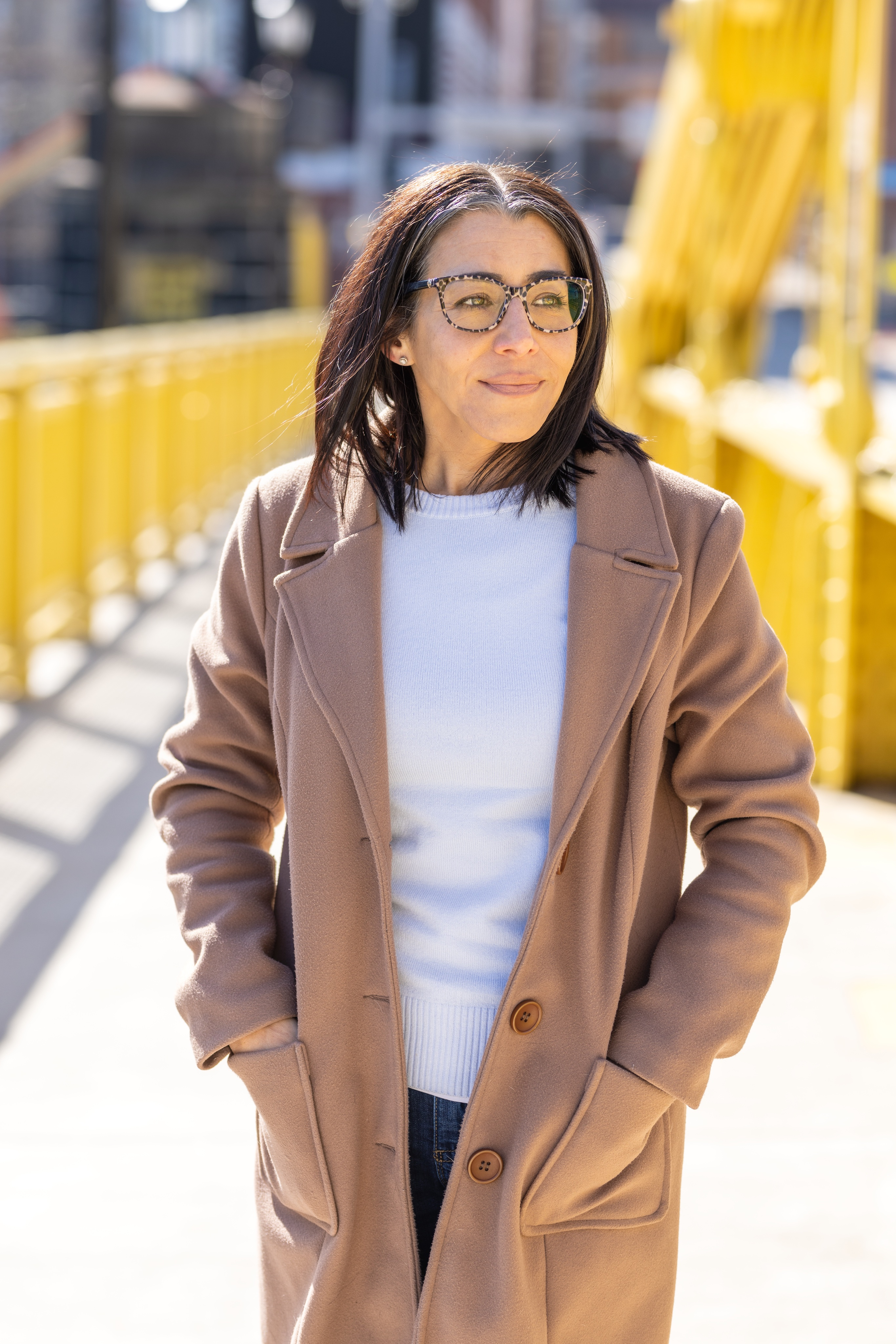
Virginia Montanez in 2023

Virginia Montanez is an American writer, author, essayist, and columnist based in Pittsburgh, Pennsylvania. She is a history columnist at Pittsburgh Magazine and the author of Nothing. Everything.

== Early life ==
Montanez was born with profound hearing loss in Pittsburgh, Pennsylvania. She was raised in a Pittsburgh suburb in Westmoreland County where she attended Norwin High School.

== Professional and writing career ==
In 2005, while employed as the communications director at a Pittsburgh nonprofit, Montanez created and anonymously authored (under the name PittGirl) a blog about Pittsburgh called The Burgh Blog where she became noted for her scathing portrayals of local politicians, particularly then-Pittsburgh-mayor Luke Ravenstahl. In November 2008, she abruptly ended the blog, saying that someone had figured out her identity.

She became an anonymous humor columnist at Pittsburgh Magazine in June of 2009. When Montanez revealed her identity and created a new blog (That’s Church) in August of 2009, she was fired from her position at the nonprofit.

As a blogger, Montanez partnered with the Mario Lemieux Foundation, with support from Pittsburgh-area Microsoft employees, to create Make Room for Kids, a program that installed Xbox consoles in nearly every in-patient room at Children’s Hospital of Pittsburgh, along with providing video games and movies. Montanez shuttered her blog and her magazine column in 2016 saying she wished to focus on writing novels and returning to school for a history degree.

In March 2020, during the COVID-19 lockdowns, Montanez launched a Substack newsletter called Breathing Space where she continues to write (most often with a humorous bent) about the city of Pittsburgh and other passions, including space exploration and travel. In April 2022, she announced that she would be publishing her debut novel Nothing. Everything. in 2023 with Winding Road Stories. In January 2023, she resumed writing for Pittsburgh Magazine, this time as a history columnist.

In January 2023, Montanez launched Pittsburgh Remains to be Seen, a mapping project showing where remnants from long-gone structures can be found throughout the Pittsburgh area.
