= WGH (company) =

Defunct British ride manufacturer

WGH Ltd - Transportation Engineering
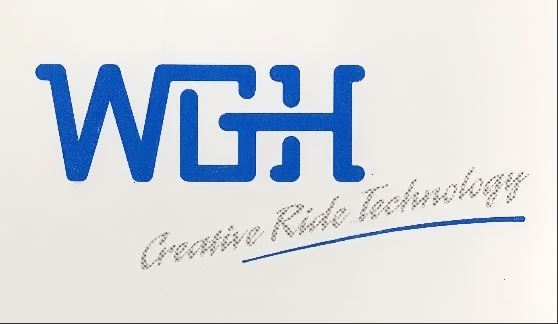
- Trade name: WGH Ltd
- Formerly: Whitley, Geddes & Howarth Ltd
- Traded as: WGH Transportation Engineering Ltd
- Industry: Manufacturing
- Founded: 1989; 37 years ago
- Founder: Andrew Howarth, John Martin and Tony Brown
- Fate: Acquired by Stage One Creative Services Ltd
- Successor: Stage One Creative Services Ltd
- Headquarters: Manor Farm Buildings, Old Edlington, Doncaster, South Yorkshire, UK
- Area served: Worldwide
- Key people: Andrew Howarth (managing director)
- Products: Amusement rides and roller coasters
- Number of employees: 10
- Website: www.wgh.ltd.uk

WGH LTD - Transportation Engineering Ltd was a British company that manufactured and supplied different types of amusement rides, funicular railways, inclined lift systems, and other transport systems over a 27 year period.

== History ==
Founded by Andrew Howarth, John Martin and Tony Brown. The company started as Closechase Ltd from February 1989 until April 1989, then was renamed to Whitley, Geddes & Howarth Ltd from 1989 until 1991.

The managing directors of WGH Ltd previously worked for Gyro Mining Transport (GMT) from 1977 until 1989 when they sold the firm to Hunslet Engineering Company, based in Leeds, UK due to the decline of the mining industry in the United Kingdom.

Andrew Howarth was approached by Mimafab Ltd in 1985 who introduced him to the business of leisure and amusement attractions while working for GMT at the time. Shortly after, GMT worked with Mimafab Ltd, who then became MERIDIAN (MOTIONEERING) LTD, to produce two log flume attractions together for Camelot Theme Park in Chorley, UK and Rotunda Amusement Park in Folkstone, UK.

In 2002, WGH Ltd partnered with South Korean company POSCO to create a concept and design a new environmentally friendly public transport automated transport system that would later be known as the Personal Rapid Transit (PRT). In 2005, they officially registered the company VECTUS Ltd, and Andrew Howarth would take on the role as company director. The first PRT system was first tested in Uppsala, Sweden in 2006. In 2007 the PRT vehicle concept was given a safety approval from the Swedish Rail Agency. Andrew Howarth resigned as company director in May 2006.

In late November 2009, the Dreamland Trust were given a grant to restore the Scenic Railway as well as the rest of the park at Dreamland Margate, in Kent, England, after it was victim to arson in 2008. In 2014, Thanet District Council contracted WGH Ltd to rebuild the trains and the rides mechanical systems, while Topbond Plc were contracted to rebuild the wooden structure. The Scenic Railway reopened to the public on 15 October 2015.

In March 2016, it was reported that WGH Ltd was acquired by Stage One Creative Services Ltd, a York based company who specialises in the stage and entertainment industry. Many of the staff moved on to work for Stage One Creative Services Ltd and other companies within the amusement industry such as Garmendale Engineering.

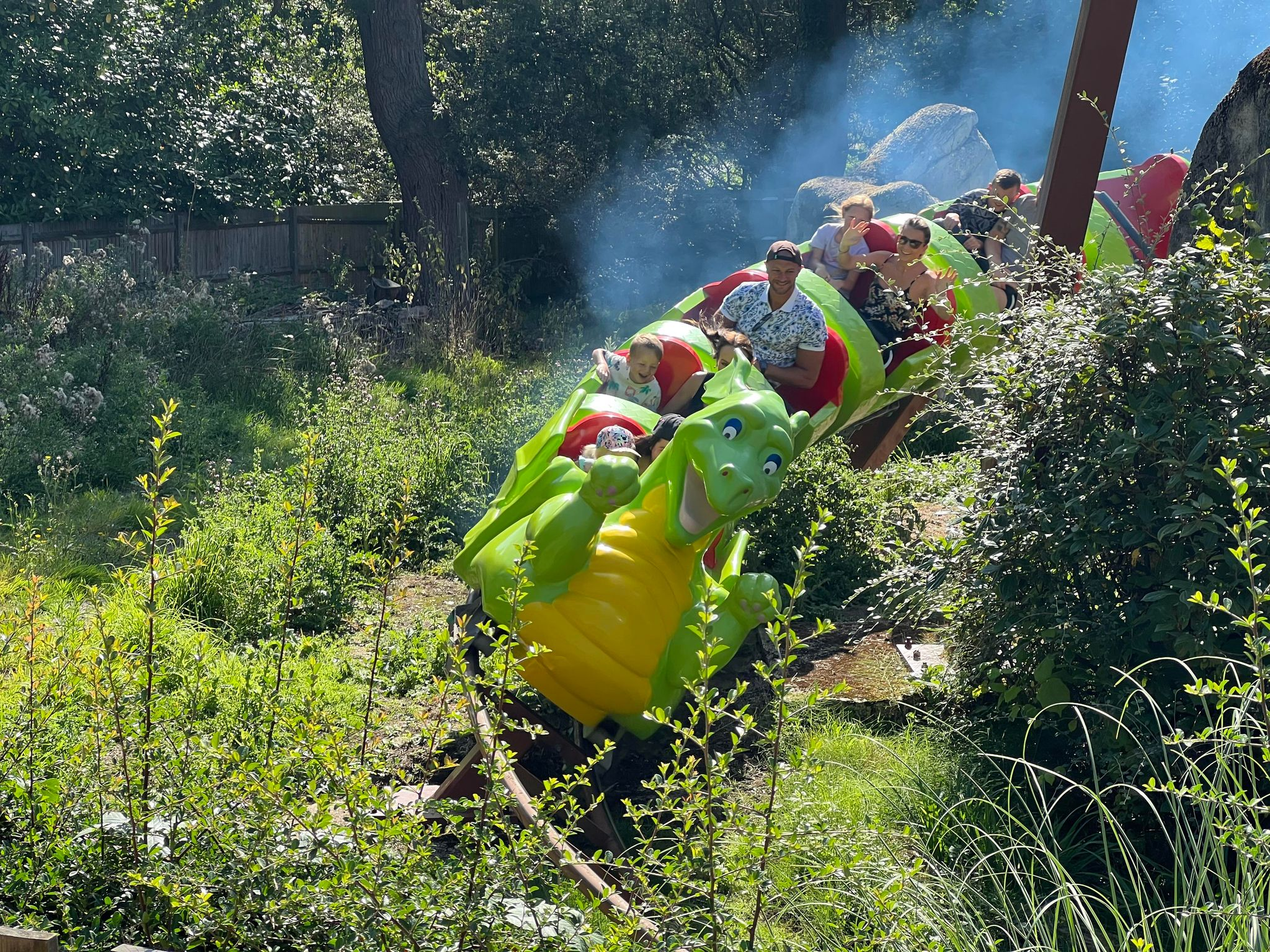
Dragon's Apprentice @ Legoland Windsor Resort, UK | 1999 | W553

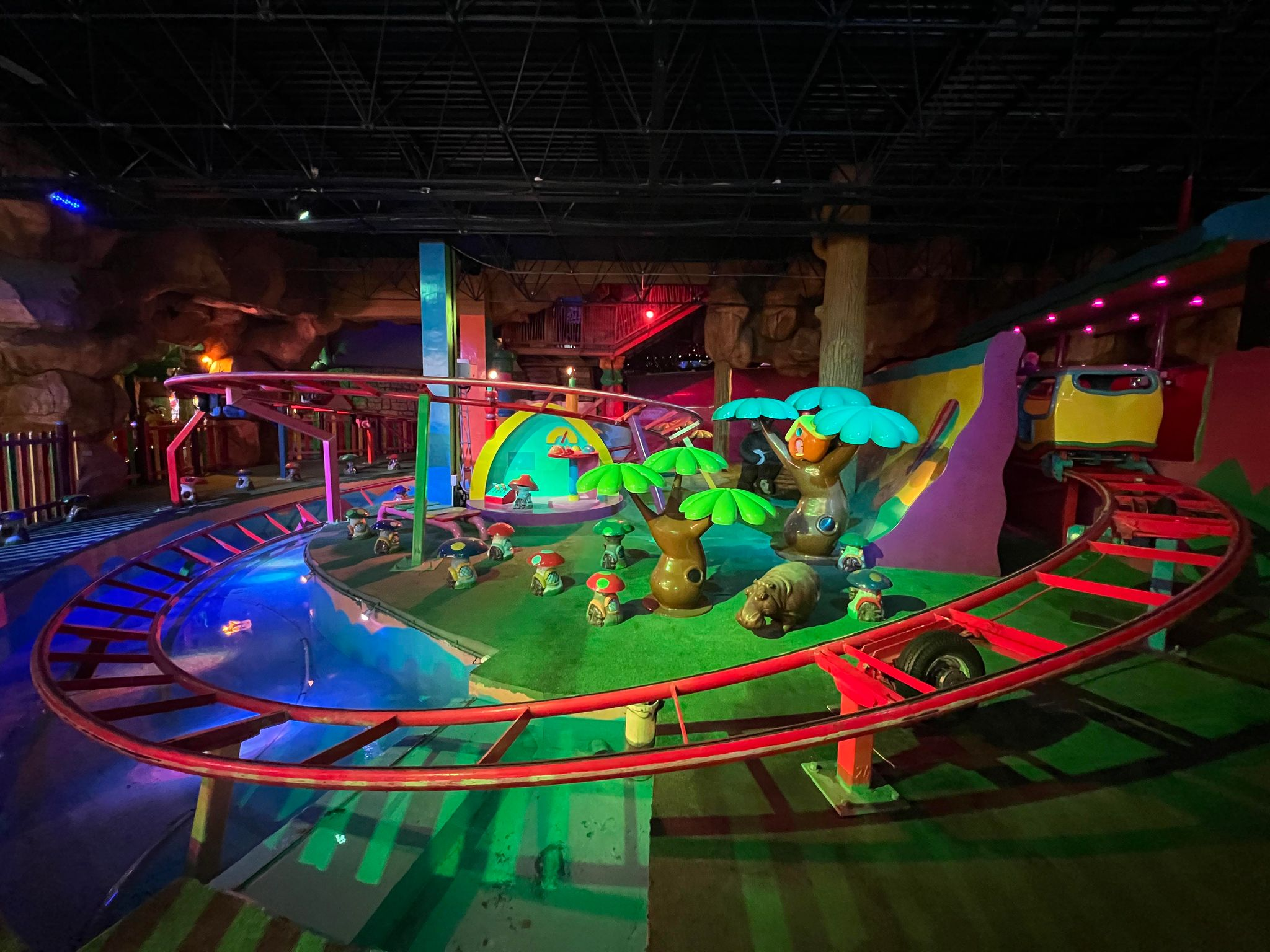
Jellikins Coaster @ Fantasy Island Resort, UK | 1996 | W360

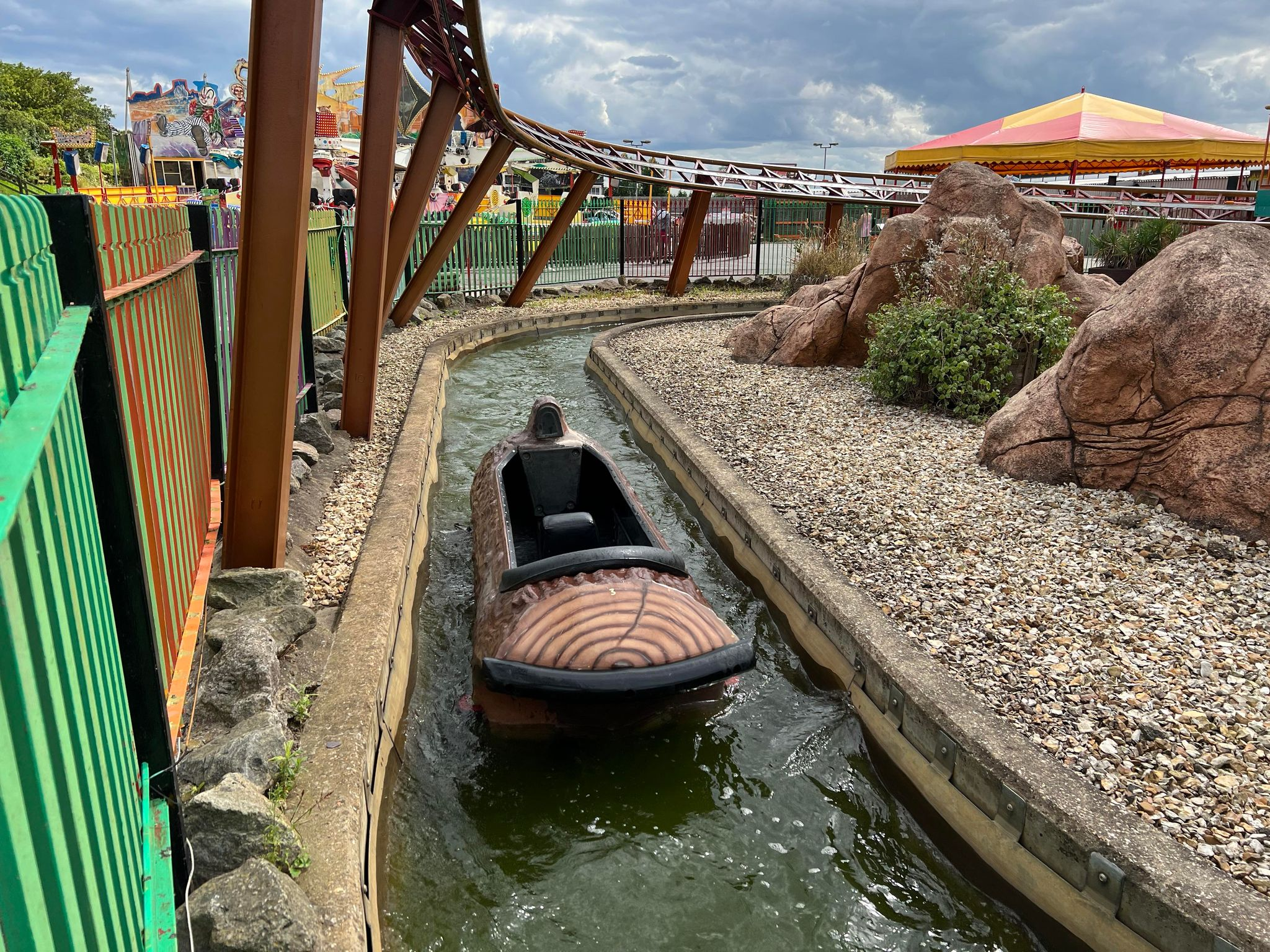
Log Flume @ Fantasy Island Resort, UK | 1995 | W316

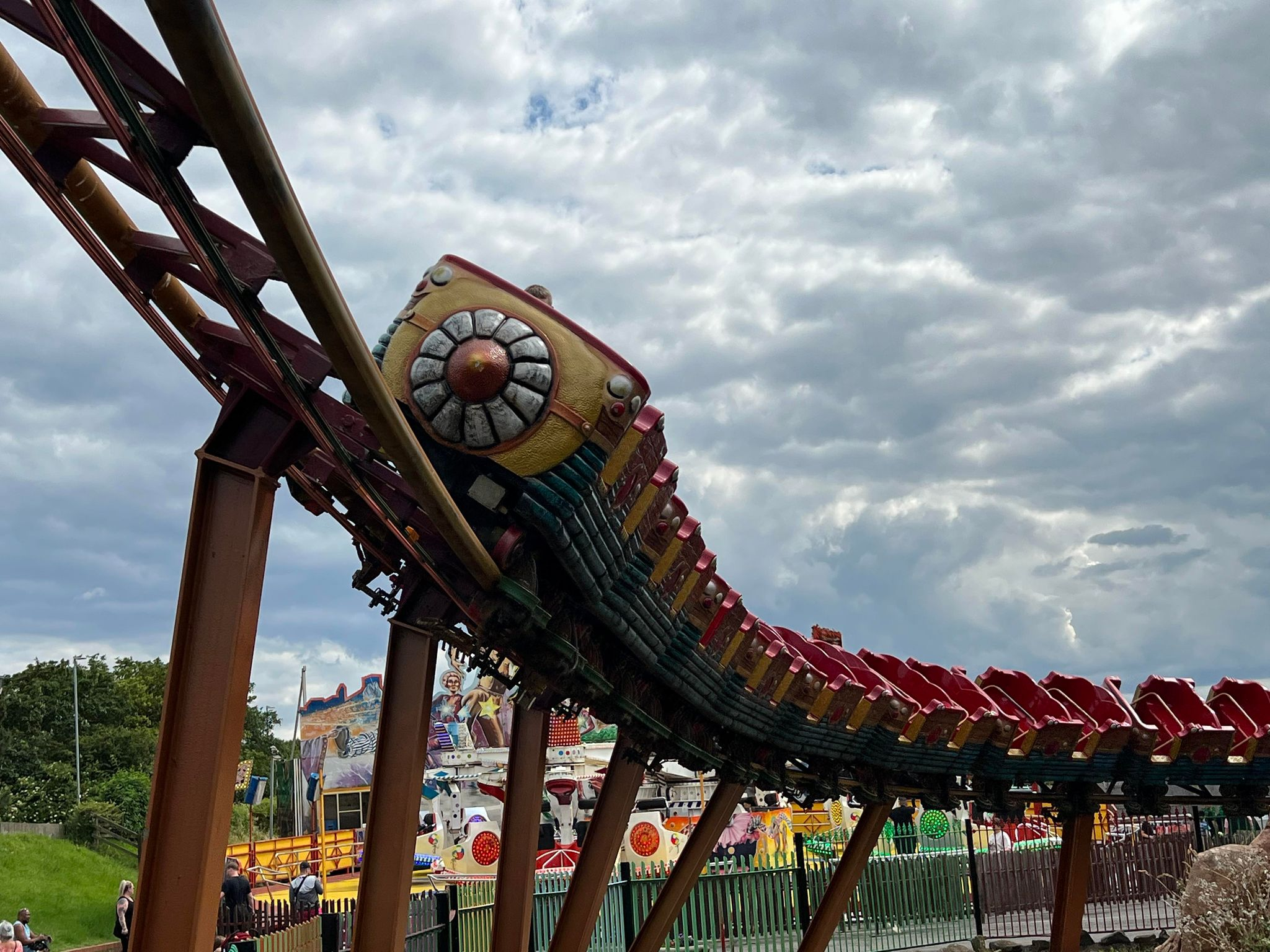
Rhombus Rocket @ Fantasy Island Resort, UK | 1995 | W315

== Roller coasters ==
Between 1995 and 2004, WGH Ltd built 6 roller coasters, ranging between mini coasters, custom-terrain, and powered roller coasters.

Name	Type	Project No.	Park	Country	Year	Ref
Rhombus Rocket	Powered Coaster	W315	Fantasy Island	United Kingdom	1995	
Jellikins Coaster	Mini Coaster	W360	Fantasy Island	United Kingdom	1996	
The Dragon	Custom Family Coaster	W381	Legoland Windsor	United Kingdom	1998	
Spook Express	Mini Coaster	W466	Joyland	United Kingdom	1998	
Dragon's Apprentice	Mini Coaster	W553	Legoland Windsor	United Kingdom	1999	
Green Dragon	Custom Family Coaster	W940	GreenWood Forest Park	Wales	2004	

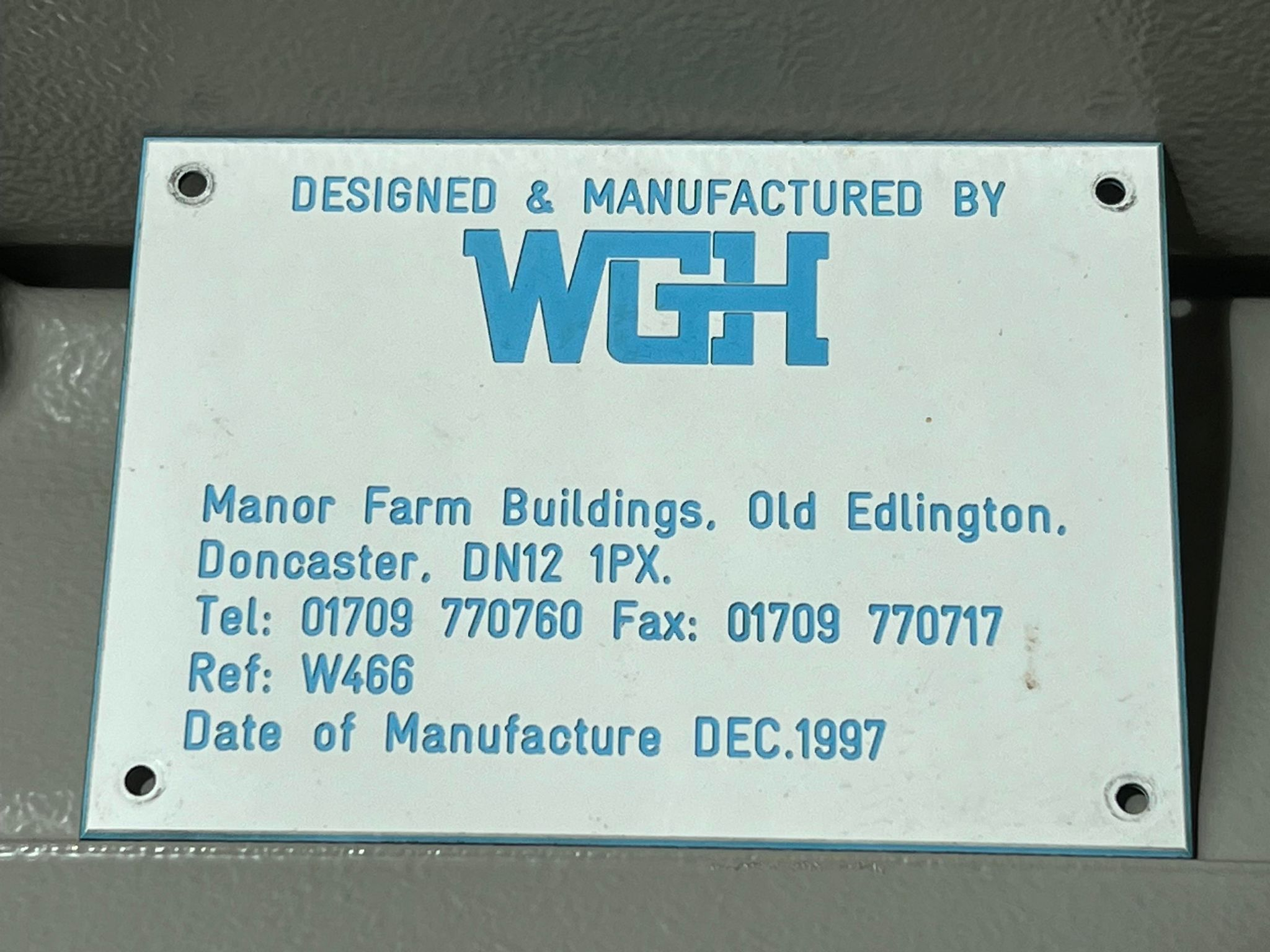
Builders plate for W466, Spook Express @ Joyland Children's Park, UK

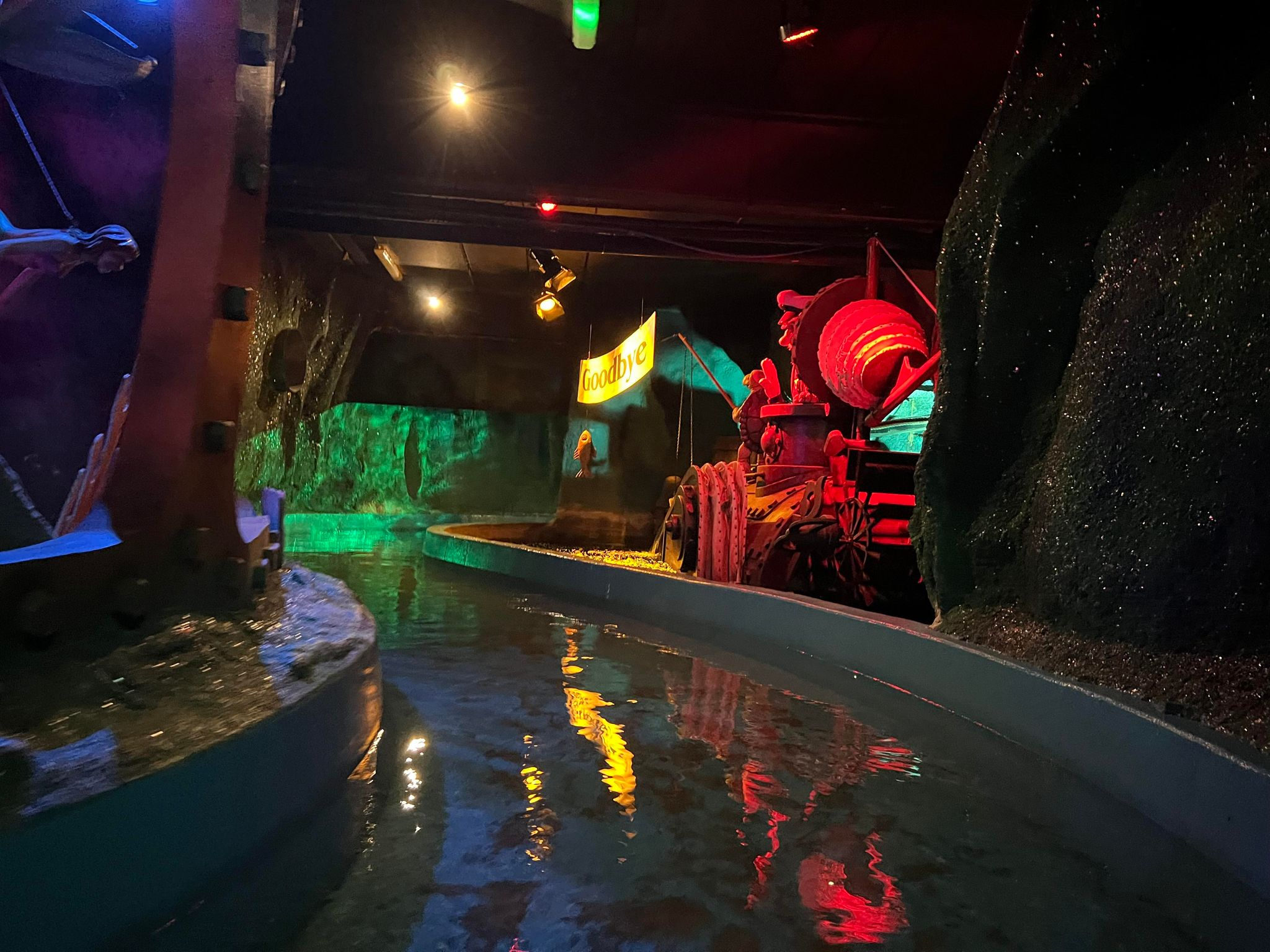
The Magic Seaquirum @ Fantasy Island Resort, UK | 1995 | W317

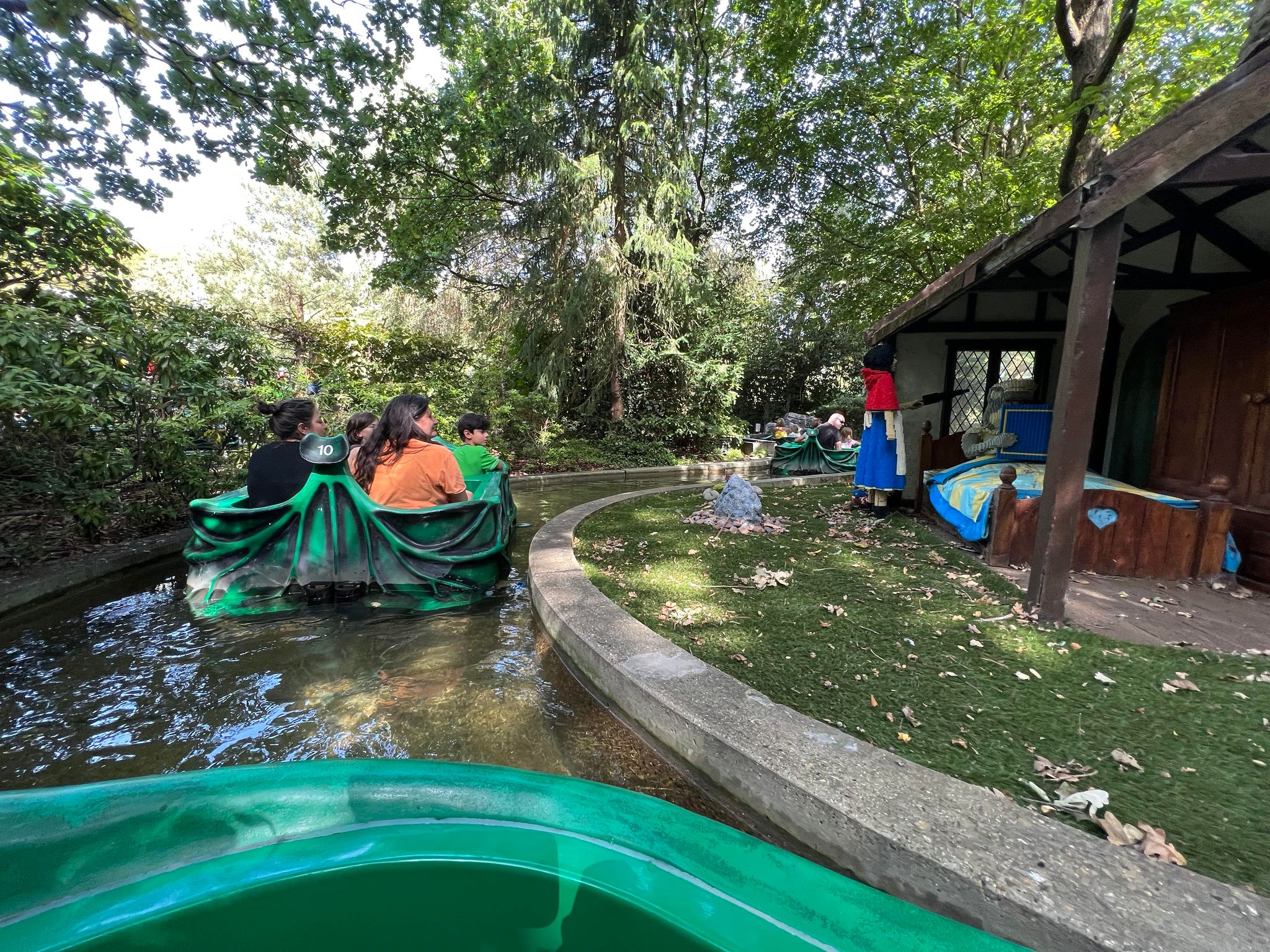
Fairy Tale Brook @ Legoland Windsor Resort, UK | 1996 | W314

== Water rides ==
WGH Ltd supplied a range of different type of water rides including tub rides (small round boat rides), log flumes, and themed boat rides.

Name	Type	Project No.	Park	Country	Year	Status
The Magical Seaqurium	Tub Ride	W317	Fantasy Island	United Kingdom	1995	Operating
Big River Ride	Tub Ride	W347	Watermouth Family Theme Park and Castle	United Kingdom	2001	Operating
TV's Family Favourites	Tub Ride	W347	Crinkley Bottom, Cricket St Thomas	United Kingdom	1995	Closed
Cactus Canyon	Tub Ride	W431	Botton's Pleasure Beach (Skegness)	United Kingdom	1997	Closed
Dora's World Voyage	Tub Ride	W569	Blackpool Pleasure Beach	United Kingdom	2011	Operating
Drunken Barrels	Tub Ride	W378	Loudoun Castle	United Kingdom	2006	Closed
Stowaway	Tub Ride	W378	Dreamland Margate	United Kingdom	1996	Closed
Fairy Tale Brook	Boat Ride	W314	Legoland Windsor	United Kingdom	1996	Operating
Flodfärden	Tub Ride	W409	Furuviksparken	Sweden	1997	Operating
Jolly Pirate Boat	Tub Ride	W211	Sundown Adventureland	United Kingdom	1992	Operating
River Boats	Tub Ride	W378	Halmstad Äventyrsland	Sweden	2012	Closed
Gruffalo River Ride Adventure	Tub Ride	W265	Chessington World of Adventures	United Kingdom	1990	Operating
Tommy Tinkaboo's Sweet Adventure	Tub Ride	W239	Pleasure Island Family Theme Park	United Kingdom	1993	Closed
Wind In The Willows	Tub Ride	W1141	Twinlakes Park	United Kingdom	2008	Operating
Log Flume	Flume Ride	W316	Fantasy Island	United Kingdom	1995	Operating
Great Expectations Boat Ride	Indoor Flume Ride	W1010	Dickens World	United Kingdom	2007	Closed
Traitor	Indoor Flume Ride	W427	London Dungeon(Tooley Street)	United Kingdom	1997	Closed
Störtebeker the boat ride (Hafen Gangs)	Indoor Flume Ride	W623	Hamburg Dungeon	Germany	2000	Operating
Tyrant Boat Ride	Indoor Flume Ride	W1300	London Dungeon(South Bank)	United Kingdom	2013	Operating

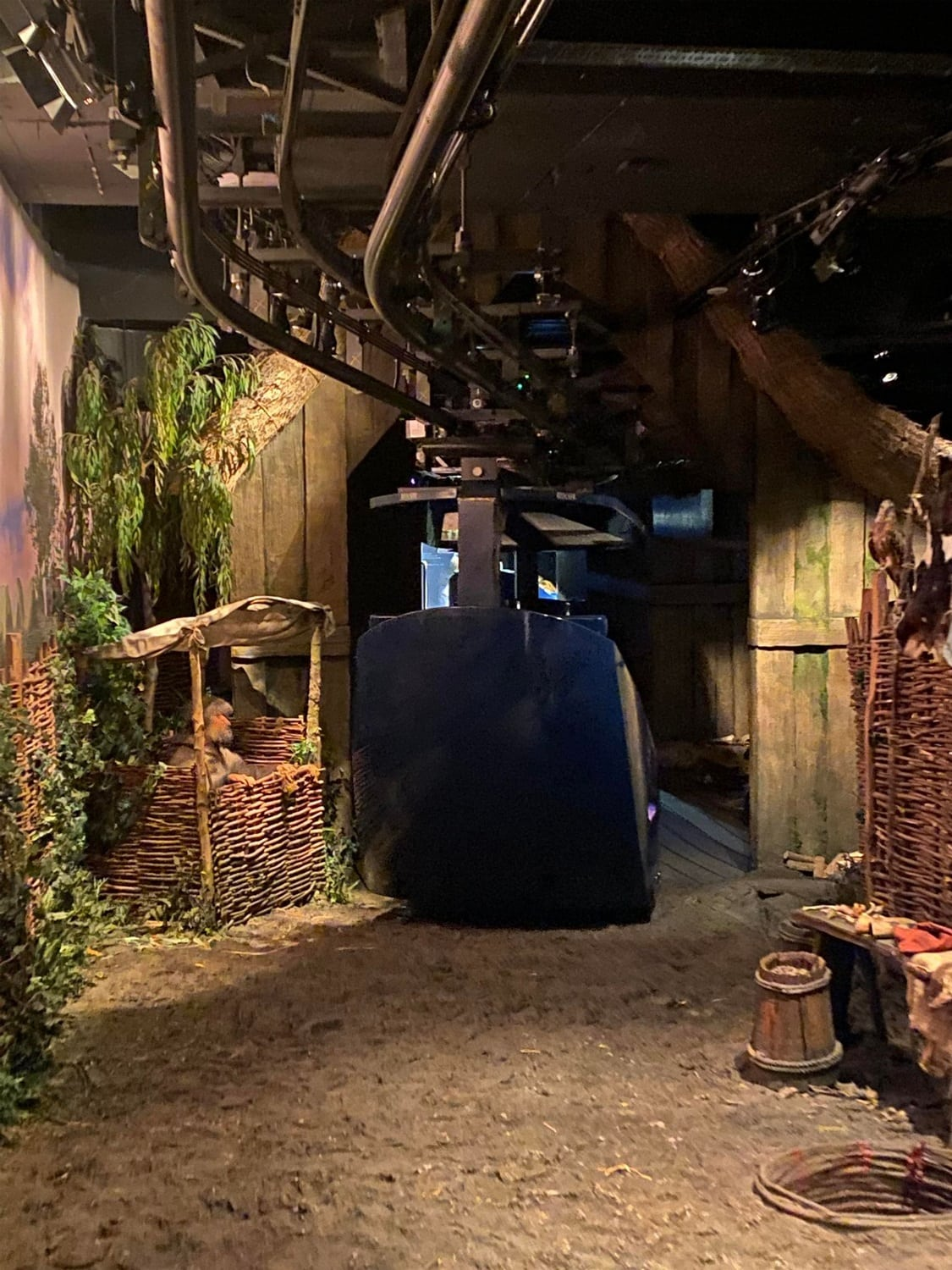
Time Ride @ Jorvik Viking Centre, York | 2001 | W636

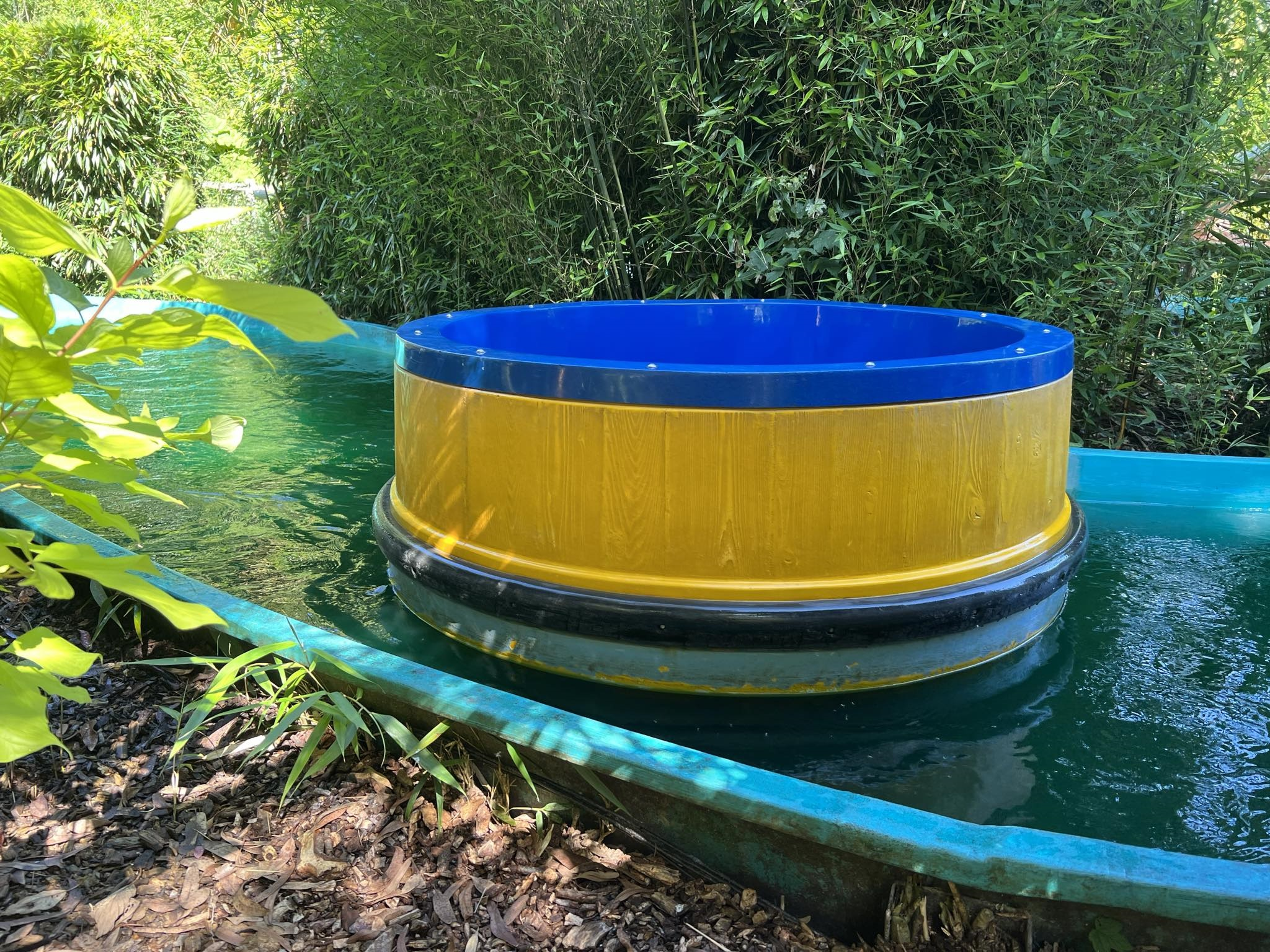
Big River Ride @ Watermouth Castle, UK | 2001 | W347

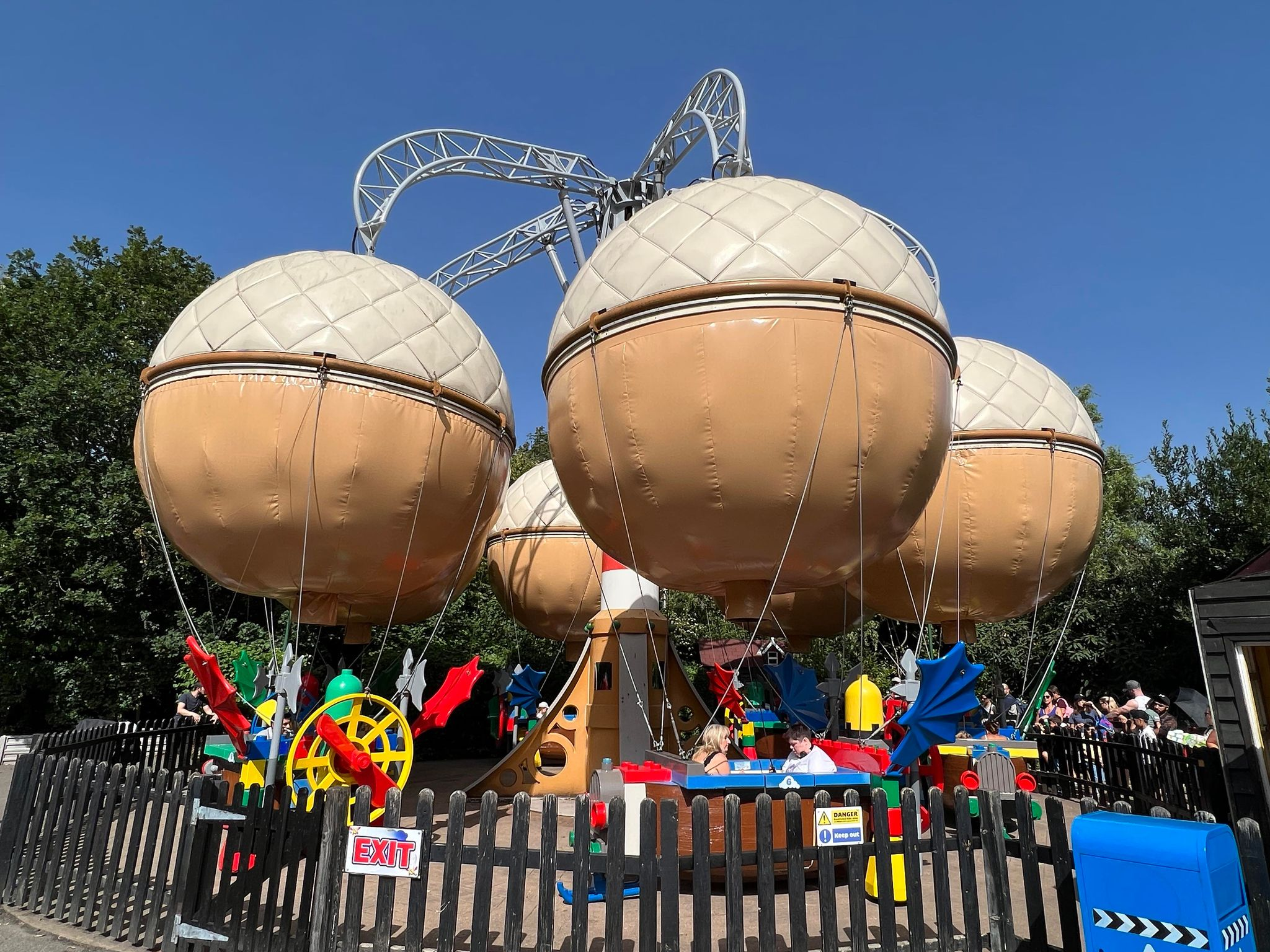
Balloon School @ Legoland Windsor Resort, UK | 1999 | W555

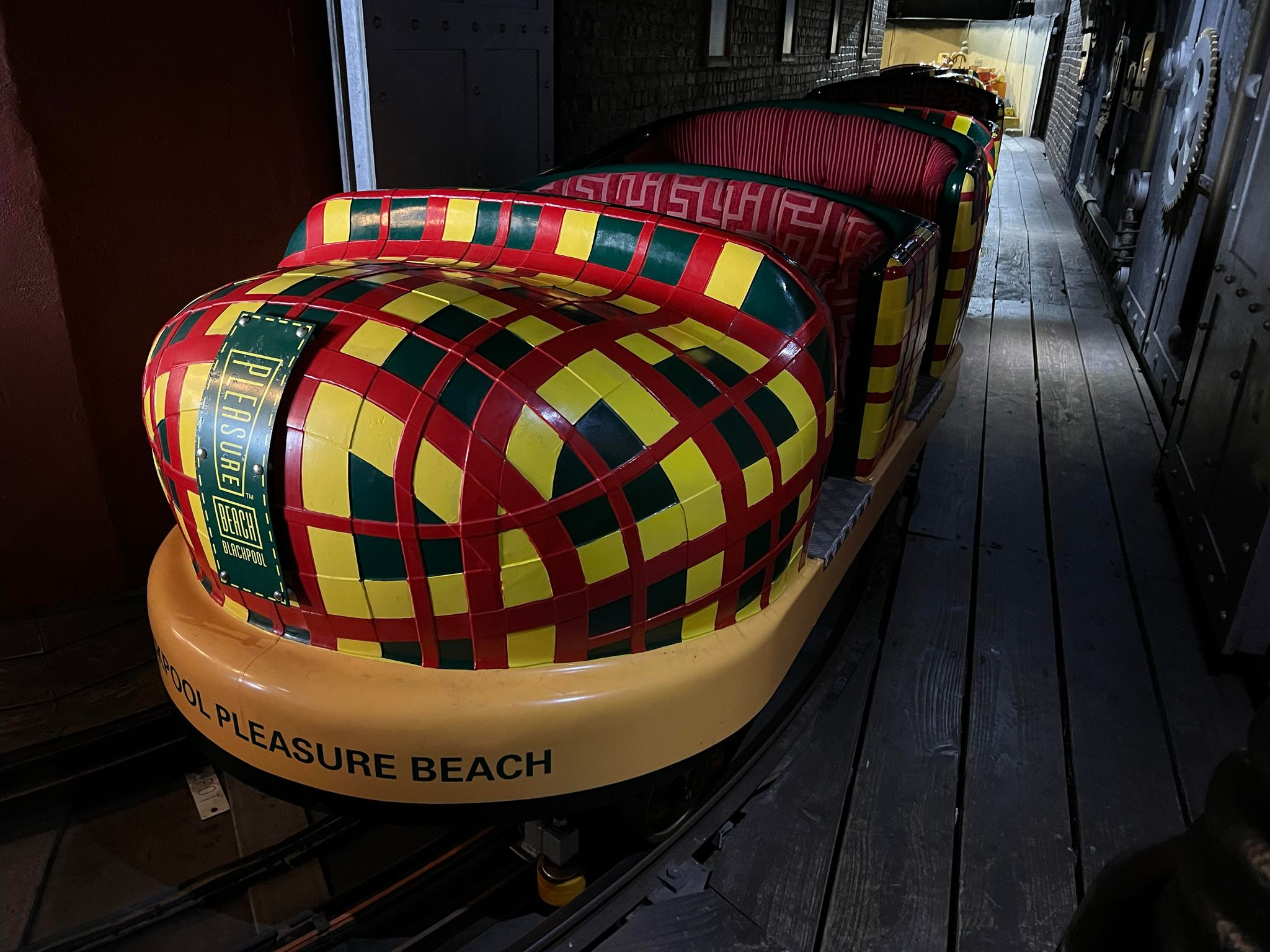
Wallace & Gromit: Thrill-O-Matic @ Blackpool Pleasure Beach, UK | 2013 | W1294

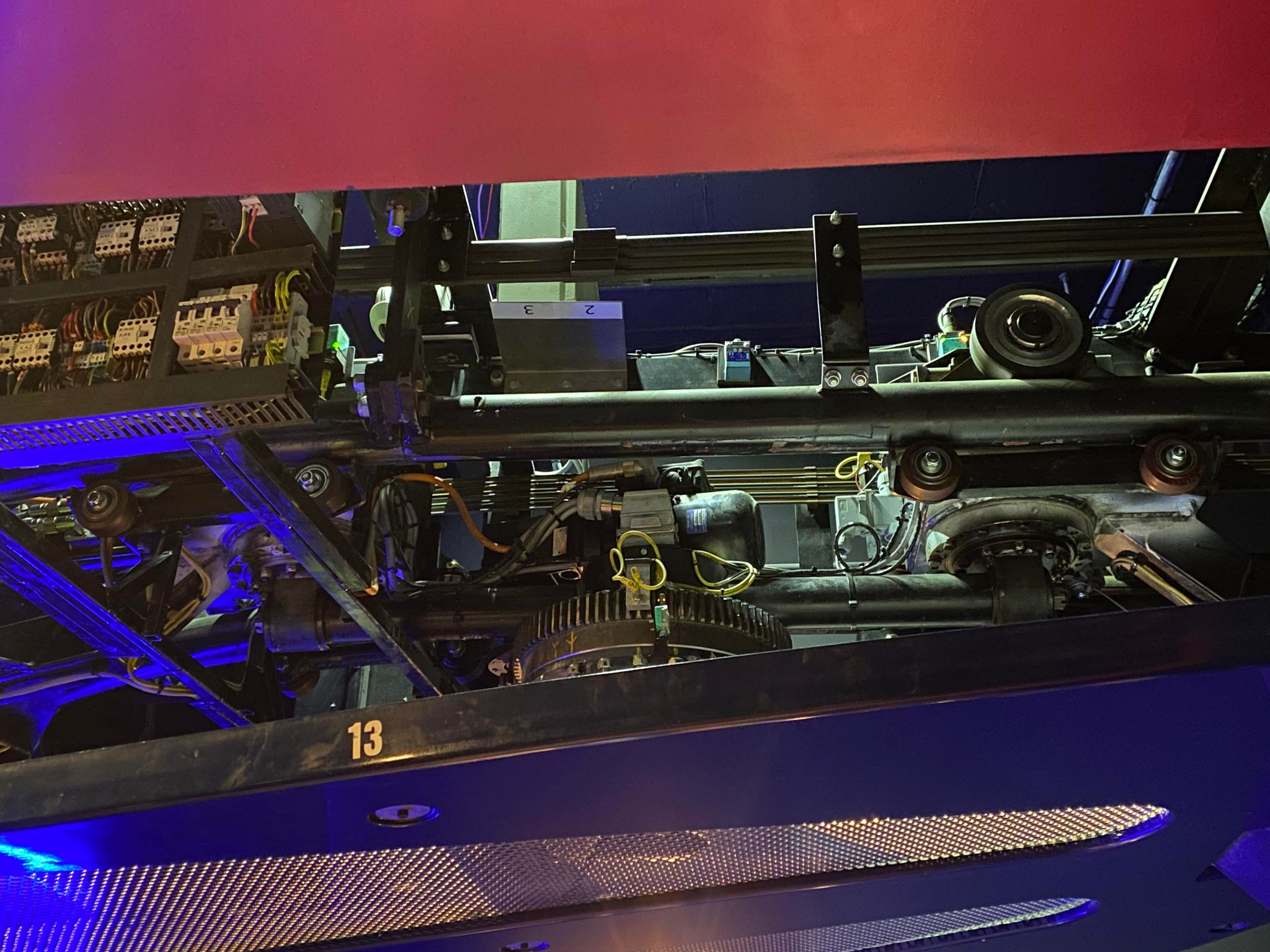
Close up of mechanical components for Jorvik Viking Centre's Time Ride | 2001 | W636

== Tracked rides, suspended monorails and other rides ==
WGH Ltd also supplied track-based rides ranging from ground models and suspended monorails.

Name	Type	Project No.	Park	Country	Year	Status
Annie McLeod Experience Ride	Suspended Dark Ride	W159	New Lanark World Heritage Site	Scotland	1990	Operating
U.F.O. Zone	Suspended Dark Ride	W270	Granada Studios	United Kingdom	1993	Closed
Shipyard Ride	Suspended Dark Ride	W1250	Titanic Experience	(United Kingdom) Northern Ireland	2012	Operating
Taikasirkus	Suspended Dark Ride	W432	Linnanmäki	Finland	1997	Operating
Time Ride	Suspended Dark Ride	W636	Jorvik Viking Centre	United Kingdom	2001	Operating
Maritime Museum	Suspended Dark Ride	W800	Khalifa Park	United Arab Emirates	2003	Operating
The Knight Ride	Suspended Dark Ride	W224	Carrickfergus Heritage Centre	(United Kingdom) Northern Ireland	1993	Closed
Crazy Clown Ride	Tracked Ride	W361	Fantasy Island	United Kingdom	1996	Closed
Noel's House Party Guest Ride	Tracked Ride	W313	Crinkley Bottom, Cricket St Thomas	United Kingdom	1994	Closed
Mischief Mansion	Tracked Ride	W700	Flamingo Land	United Kingdom	2001	Operating
Transdemonium	Tracked Ride	W784	Parc Astérix	France	2003	Closed
Whisky Barrel Ride	Tracked Ride	W1154	Scotch Whisky Experience	Scotland	2007	Operating
Cadabra	Tracked Ride	W410	Cadburys World	United Kingdom	1997	Closed
Wallace & Gromit: Thrill-O-Matic	Tracked Ride	W1294	Blackpool Pleasure Beach	United Kingdom	2013	Operating
El tren del terror	Tracked Ride	W772	Museo de Cera de Madrid	Spain	2002	Operating
Adventures of Dreamieland	Tracked Ride	W757	Trafford Centre, Manchester	United Kingdom	2002	Closed
Opel Experience	Tracked Ride	W500	Messe Frankfurt (Auto show IAA)	Germany	1999	Closed
The Water Droplet Journey	Tracked Ride	(Unknown)	Kahramaa Awareness Park	Qatar	2010	Operating
Champagne Cellar Tour	Tracked Ride	(Unknown)	Piper-Heidsieck	France	(Unknown)	Closed
The Balloon Ride	Balloon Ride	W368	Fantasy Island	United Kingdom	1996	Operating
Balloon School	Balloon Ride	W555	Legoland Windsor	United Kingdom	1999	Operating
Ferris Wheel	Ferris Wheel	W1260	Bayt Abdullah Children's Hospice	Kuwait	2013	Operating
Regatta Ferris Wheel	Ferris Wheel	W1347	(Unknown)	Singapore	2013	(Unknown)
Funicular Railway	Funicular Railway	(Unknown)	Ebbw Vale Garden Festival	Wales	1992	Closed
The Hill Train	Funicular Railway	EO519	Legoland Windsor	United Kingdom	1991	Operating

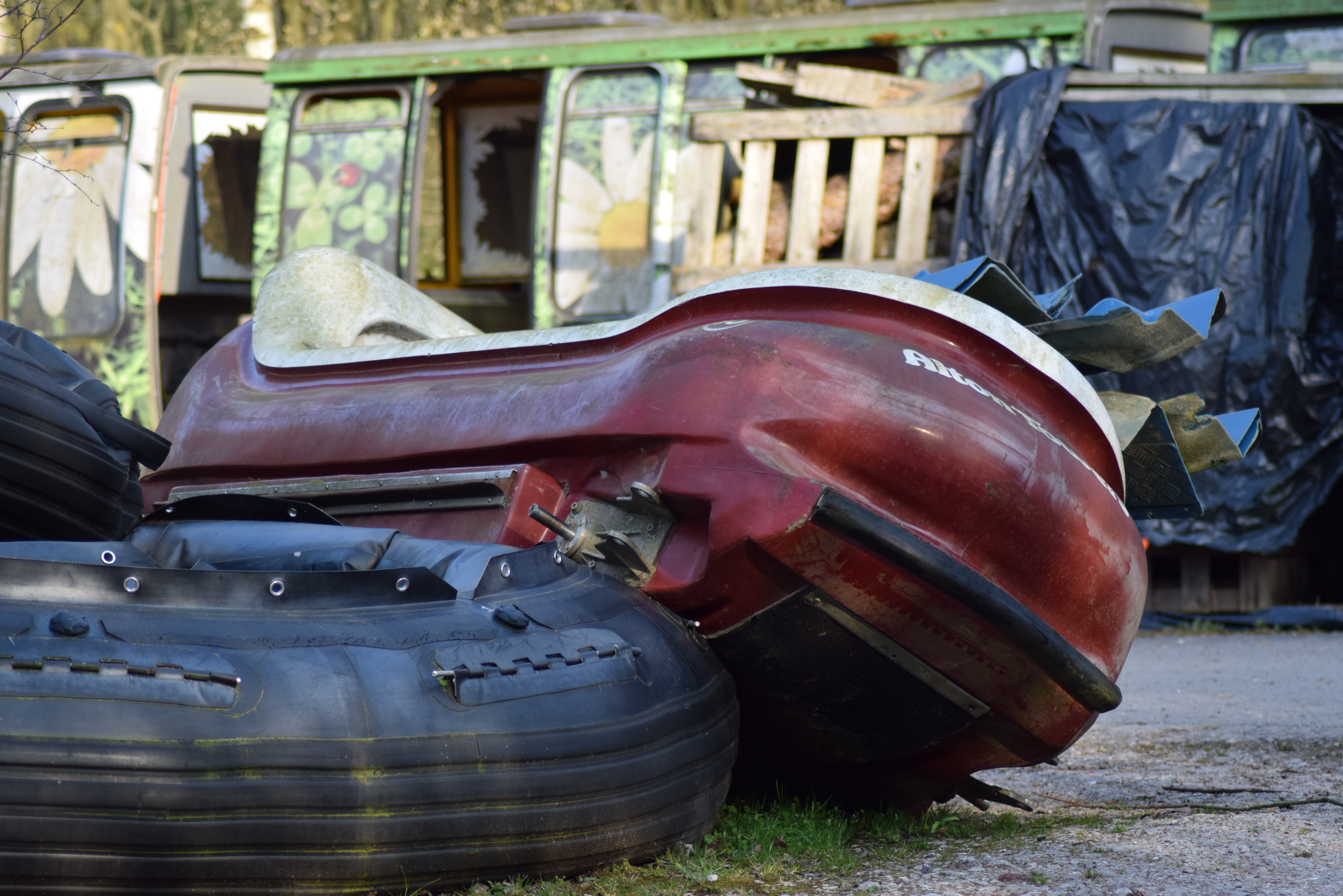
Former The Flume (1981-2015) sat backstage at Alton Towers | 2004 | W950

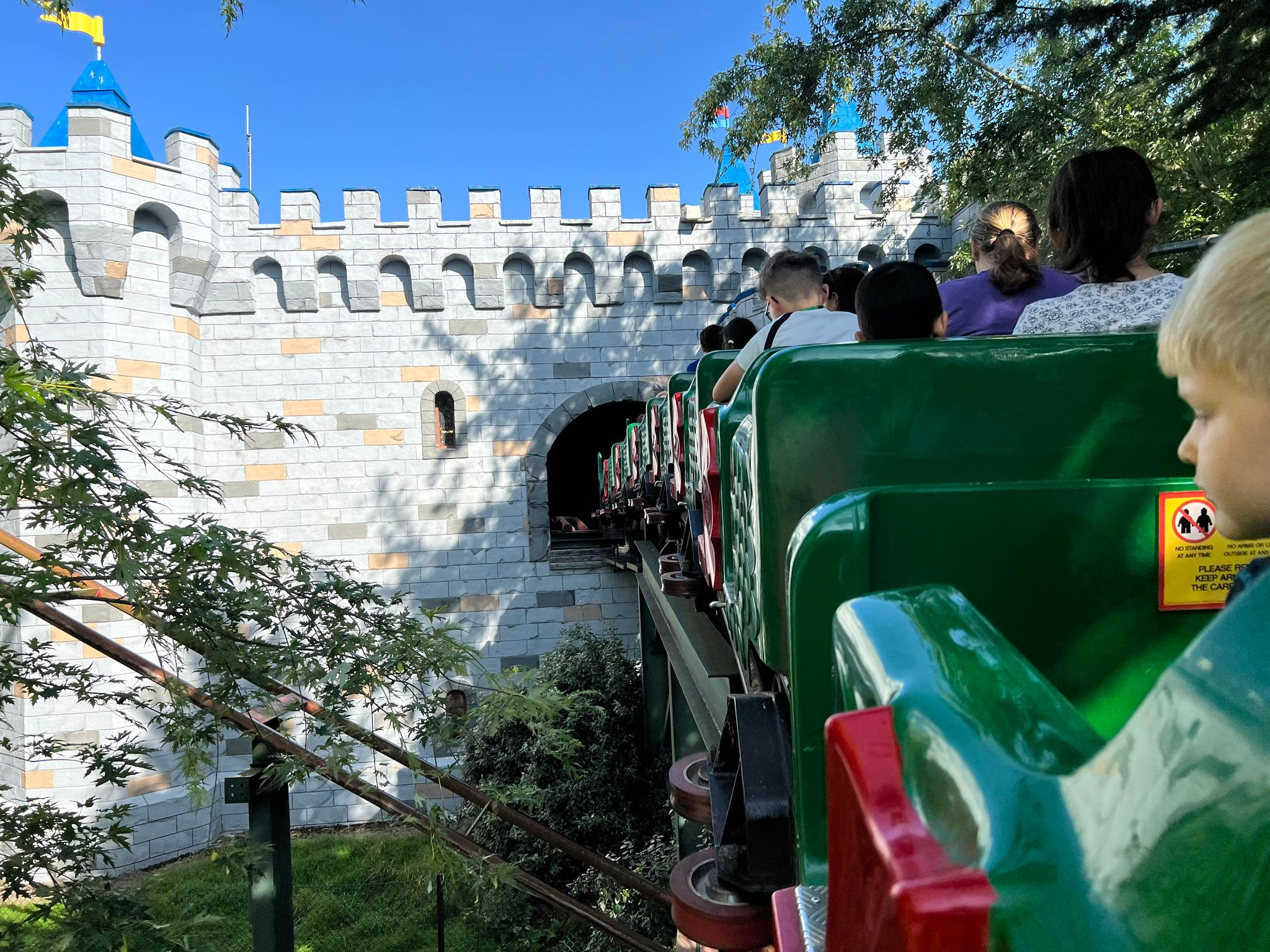
The Dragon @ Legoland Windsor Resort, UK | 1998 | W381

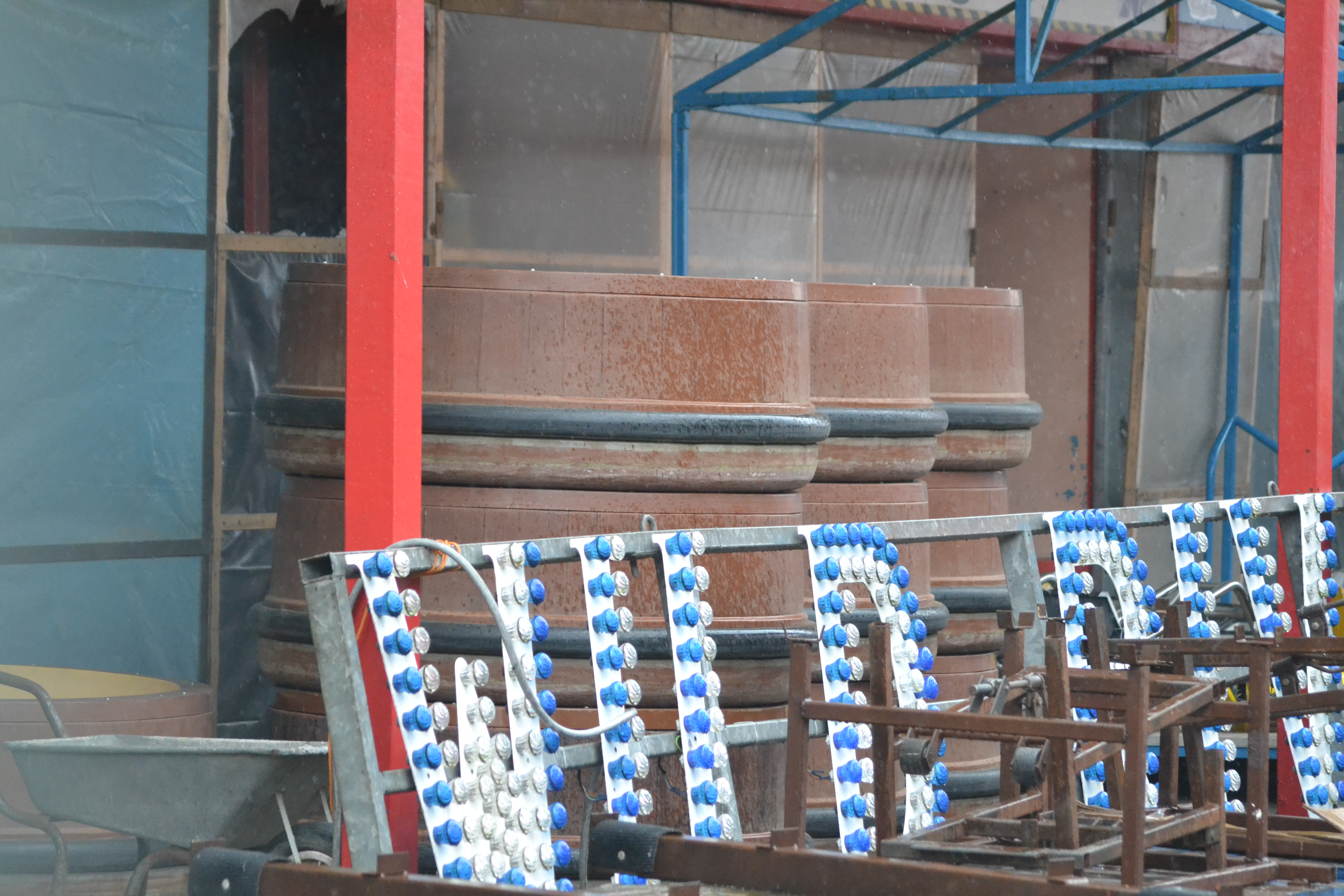
Cactus Canyon boats @ Botton's Pleasure Beach, UK | 1997 | W416

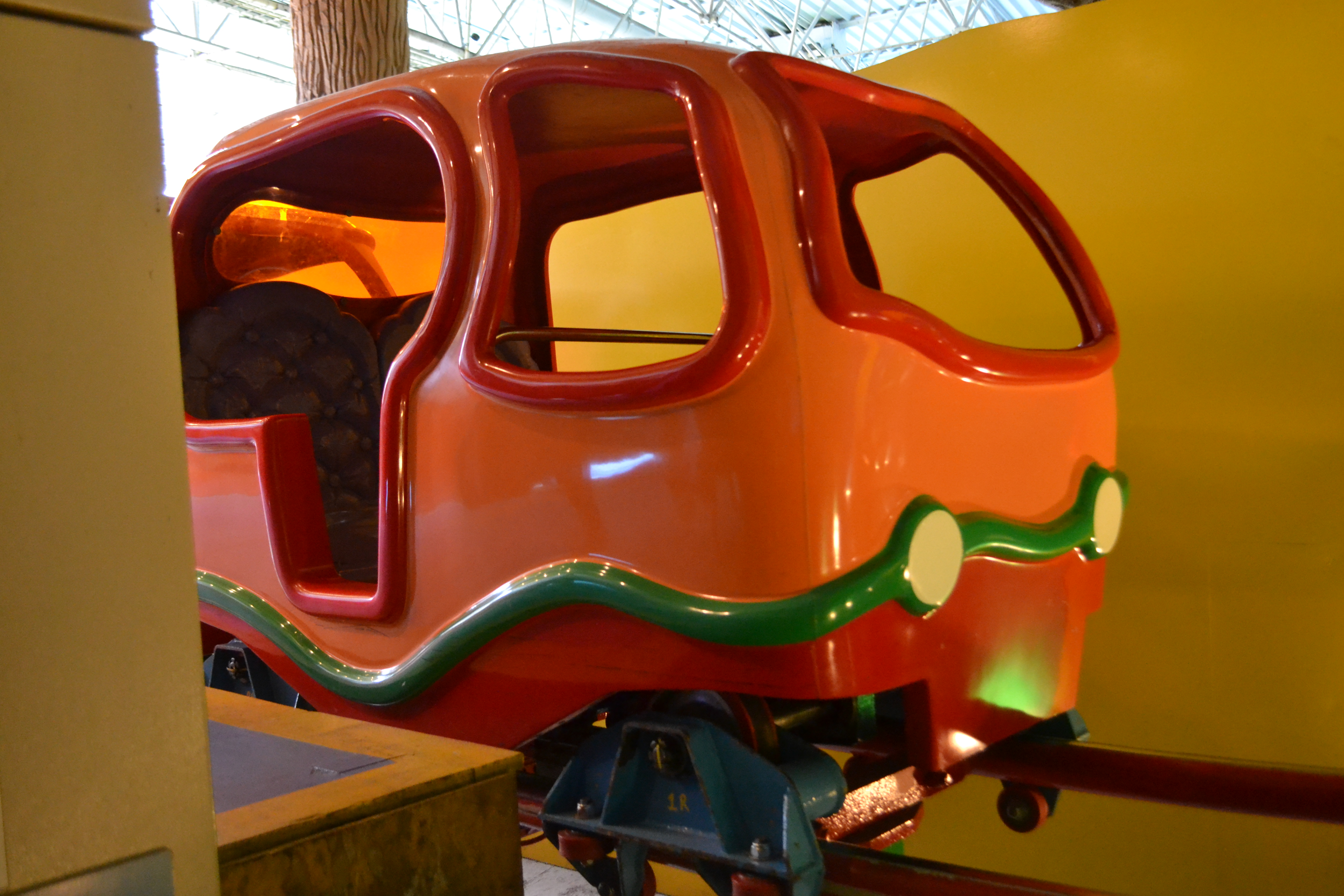
Jellikins Coaster @ Fantasy Island Resort, UK | 1996 | W360

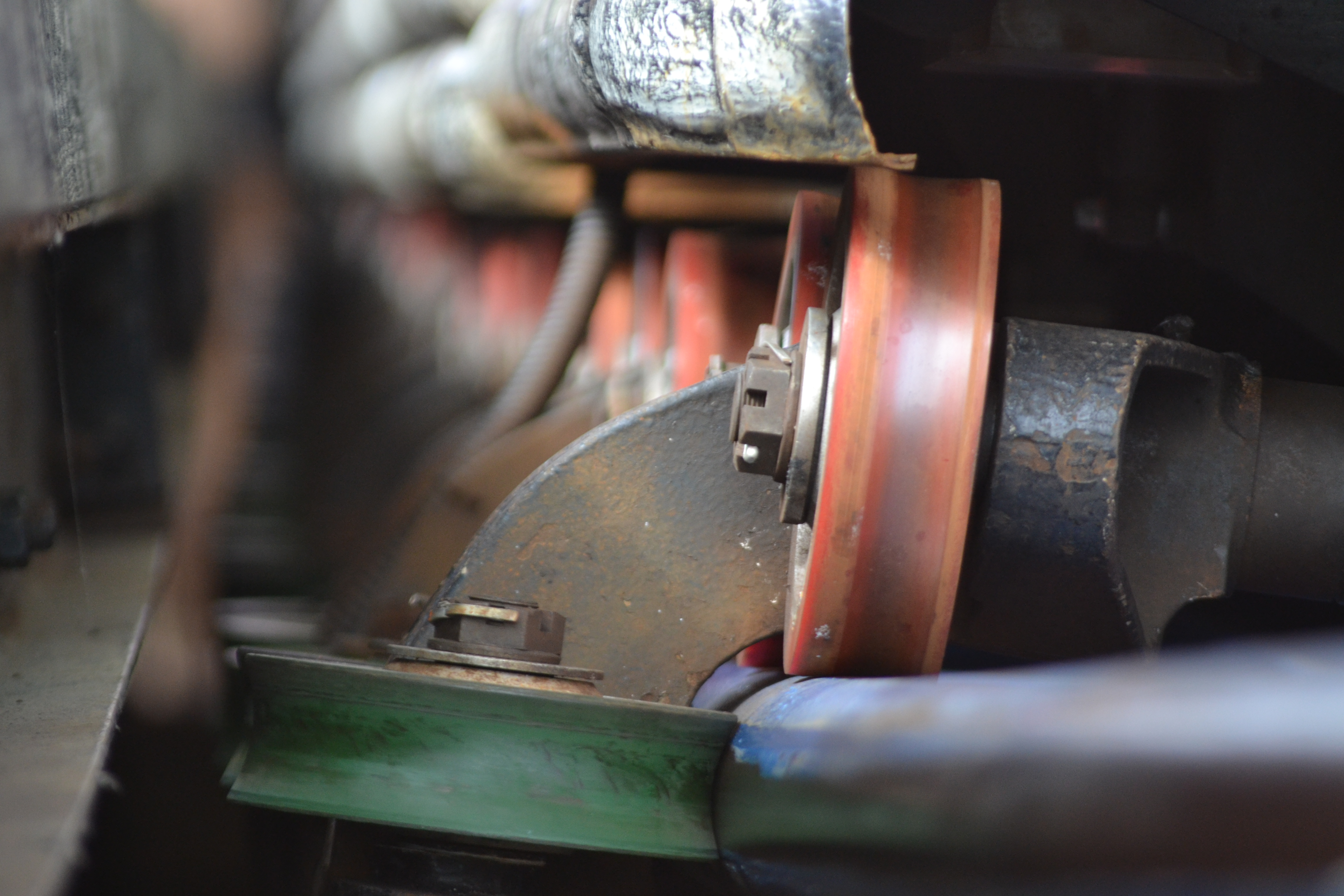
Running wheels and guide wheels for Rhombus Rocket (W315)

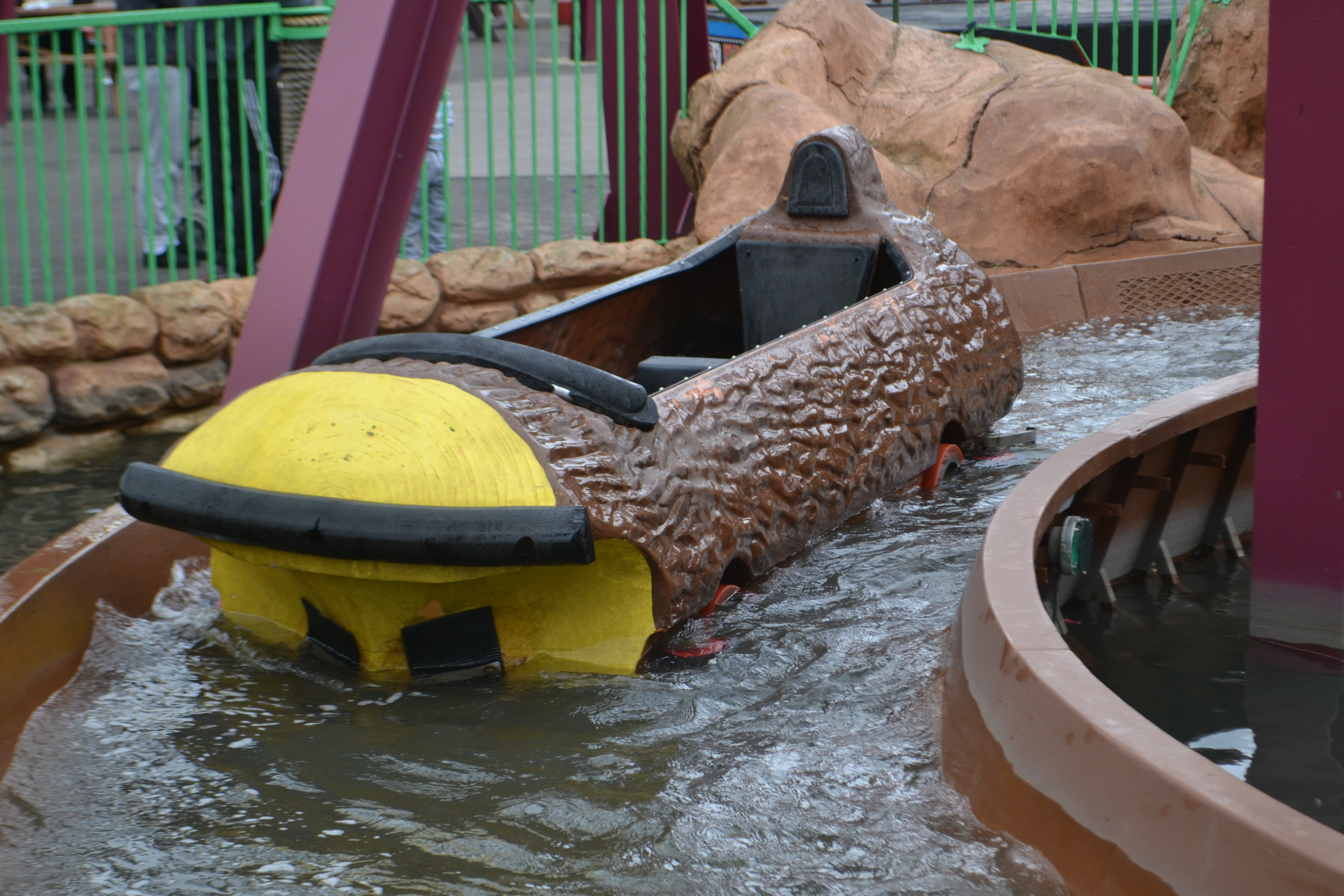
Log Flume @ Fantasy Island Resort, UK | 1995 | W316

== Other projects ==
As well as supplying and manufacturing leisure attractions, WGH Ltd were also involved in projects that involved modifications, refurbishments, extensions and other cosmetic work to existing leisure attractions.

Name	Type	Project No.	Park	Country	Year
Toucan Tours	Restraint system	W669	Fantasy Island	United Kingdom	1995
The Dragon	New 3rd train	W1216	Legoland Windsor	United Kingdom	2009
The Flume	New log flume boat	W950	Alton Towers Resort	United Kingdom	2004
London Eye (Millennium Wheel)	Automated platform system	W585	London Eye	United Kingdom	1999
London Eye (Millennium Wheel)	Passenger control gates	W613	London Eye	United Kingdom	1999
Underground Experience Tour	Simulator Vehicle	W300	Rhondda Heritage Park	Wales	1994
The Oxford Story	AGV Vehicles	Unknown	Oxford Castle	United Kingdom	2003
Inclined Lift	Inclined Lift	W663	Urbis Centre	United Kingdom	2002
Inclined Lift	Inclined Lift	W532	National Railway Museum	United Kingdom	1999
Inclined Lift	Inclined Lift	W1161	Blists Hill Victorian Town	United Kingdom	2009
Cliff lift	Inclined Lift	W729	Polperro Sewage Works	United Kingdom	2011
Tram No. 40	Horse drawn tram	W193	Bradford Industrial Museum	United Kingdom	1992
Newcastle Corporation No. 114	Replica Tram	EO692	Beamish Museum	United Kingdom	1993
Scenic Railway	Trains and mechanical system	W1377	Dreamland Margate	United Kingdom	2015
People Mover	Lift System	W401	Royal Victoria Dock Footbridge	United Kingdom	1998
Klondike Creek	Log flume extension	W560	Flamingo Land	United Kingdom	1999
Nightmare Niagara	Log flume extension	Unknown	American Adventure Theme Park	United Kingdom	1993
Sagotåget	Suspended monorail vehicles	EO706	Junibacken	Sweden	1996
Scenic Route Trommel	Trommel	W970	Conkers, Leicestershire	United Kingdom	1999
Ray Heath football tunnel	Trommel	W559	Premier League Hall of Fame County Hall	United Kingdom	1999
4-man Bobsleigh	Bobsleigh braking system	W1443	University of Bath	United Kingdom	2015
Rocky River Falls	Log flume refurbishment	E1115	Wicksteed Park	United Kingdom	2003
Unmanned Aerial Vehicle (UAV)	Launch System Technology	W1057	Alstom	United Kingdom	2009
Mole System Demonstrator	MOLE Underground Freight Pipeline	W1342	Mole Solutions Ltd	United Kingdom	2015
Drenched	New restraint system	W1008	Oakwood Theme Park	Wales	2004
The Ultimate	New wheel chevron mount and housing & track sections	W322	Lightwater Valley	United Kingdom	1992

== Notes ==
178H31.82 Gyro Mining Transport Projects Technical Drawings 1987-1988

178H31.81 Mimafab Projects Technical Drawings 1988-1989

178H31.84 Big Country Motioneering Projects Technical Drawings 1988-1989
