= Picsolve International =

Image capture and distribution company

Picsolve International Ltd.
- Formation: 1994; 32 years ago
- Headquarters: Derby, UK
- Services: Imagery capture, distribution and retailing for leisure, theme park and tourist industries
- Website: https://www.picsolve.com/
- Formerly called: Rx Technology Europe Ltd

Picsolve International Ltd. is a provider of imagery capture, distribution platforms and retailing solutions for the leisure, theme park and tourist industries. Picsolve is based in Derby, UK and has offices in the US, South East Asia and the Middle East. Picsolve was formerly known as Rx Technology Europe Ltd. Picsolve has operations at ~500 sites around the world and employs up to 1,500 staff throughout the year.

== History ==
Rx Technology was founded in 1994 in Derby, UK and later changed its name to Picsolve International Ltd in 2002. The business was acquired by Meridian Equity from its founding owner managers in May 2006. In July 2008 Picsolve was bought by Fidelity Equity Partners in a management buy out worth £33m. The deal included a senior debt package of 13m provided by Royal Bank of Scotland.

=== Investment ===
In 2012 Picsolve received a £10m investment from private backers to invest in capital and wipe out debt. In November 2013 it was announced that Picsolve had received a US$13m investment from Moonray Investors, part of Fidelity Worldwide Investment.

=== Transition ===
The company entered administration on 4 May 2020 with Deloitte appointed as administrators. The company then merged with Tel Aviv-based AI specialists Pomvom, closing the deal on 19 June 2020.

== Products ==
Picsolve provide a range of photography services to theme parks and leisure attractions including ride photography, walkabout & event photography, ride video, green screen experiences, waterpark photography and digital products. In 2012 Picsolve launched GSX which uses green screen technology to superimpose people into videos.

=== Ride Photography ===
Picsolve installs and operates ride photography on rollercoasters (sometimes referred to as on-ride photography) and rides at more than 350 locations throughout the world. Picsolve technology employs shutterless cameras capable of capturing between 4 and 30 frames per second at 16 megapixel resolution. These cameras have the ability to capture images with an equivalent shutter speed of 1/10,000th second.

=== Walkabout & Event Photography ===
Picsolve provide a walkabout photography service at a range of locations including Alton Towers, Atlantic, The Palm and Legoland Windsor .

=== Ride video ===
Ride videos provide video footage of theme park rides for guests. Picsolve has installations that feature both on-board and off-board footage which are combined to create footage which is sold to guests on DVD.

=== GSX (Green screen experience) ===
Using green screen technology Picsolve are able to provide theme park and attraction visitors with superimposed photos. Pictures are taken against either a green or blue screen and then superimposed to make visitors appear against a different backdrop. In 2012 the GSX system won the IAAPA 2012 Brass Ring Award Best New Product in the Games and Merchandise category.

=== Waterpark Photography ===
Picsolve offer image capture solutions for use with water-based rides.

=== Digital Products ===
Picsolve provide services that allow photos to be accessed online, on mobile and shared across social networks.

== Awards ==
- IAAPA 2012 Brass Ring Award Best New Product in the Games and Merchandise category.
