= Legoland Hill Train =

Funicular railway at Legoland Windsor Resort

Coordinates: 51.4636°N 0.6522°W

The Hill Train
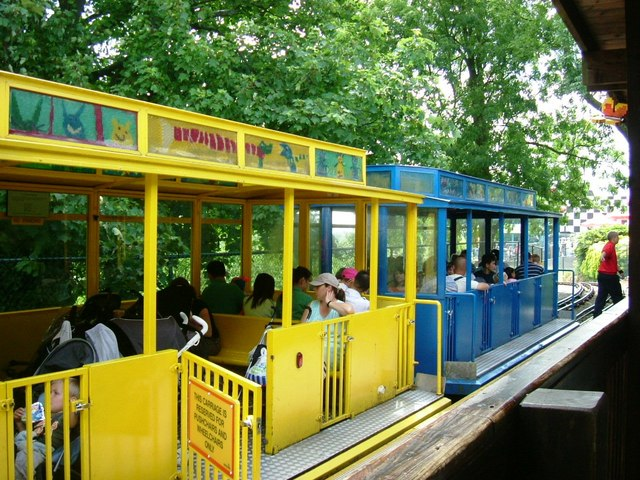
- The Hill Train at Legoland Windsor (2008)

Legoland Windsor Resort
- Status: Operating
- Opening date: 29 March 1996
- Replaced: Ride at Windsor Safari Park

Ride statistics
- Attraction type: Funicular railway
- Length: 1,650 ft (500 m)
- Duration: 2 minutes

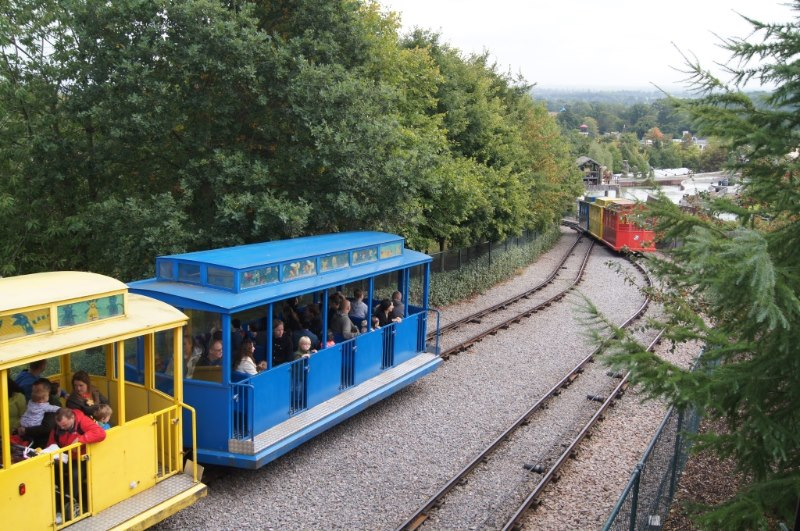
Legoland Hill Train in 2013

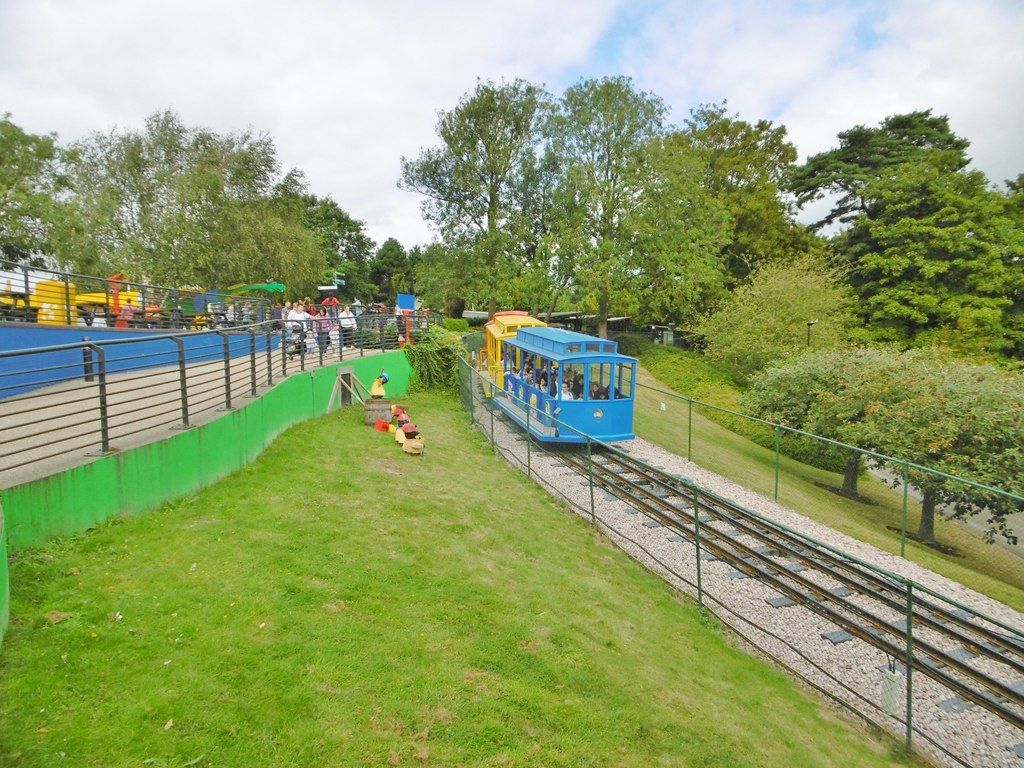
Legoland Hill Train in 2019

The Hill Train is a funicular railway ride and transportation system at Legoland Windsor Resort in Windsor, Berkshire, England. It is a 3 ft 6 in (1,067 mm) narrow gauge funicular railway down a curved slope and travels between two stations, with a height difference between the top and bottom stations of approximately 27 metres (89 ft). The railway has a track length of approximately 1,650 feet (500 m) and operates on a gradient of around 1 in 7. A typical journey lasts about two minutes.

It is the only ride located at The Beginning section of Legoland Windsor.

The Hill Train predates the Legoland theme park, having originally been installed in 1991 when the site operated as Windsor Safari Park. It is the only surviving remnant of when it was part of the Windsor Safari Park which closed in 1992, being refurbished when the park opened on 29 March 1996 with stained glass windows made from translucent Lego bricks by local school children.

The funicular train both functions as an attraction as popular transportation transporting visitors between the upper and lower areas of the park, helping guests navigate the steep terrain.

The attraction operates as a cable-hauled funicular system with two trains connected to one another, allowing one to ascend while the other descends simultaneously. This counterbalance arrangement helps regulate speed and reduces the power required to haul the trains uphill.

Each train consists of three carriages painted in bright colours including red, yellow, and blue. The central carriage provides space for pushchairs and wheelchairs, improving accessibility for guests.
