= Legoland Windsor Resort =

Lego theme park in Windsor, Berkshire, England

- Interactive map of Legoland Windsor Resort
- Location: Winkfield Road, Windsor, Berkshire, England
- Coordinates: 51.464°N 0.651°W
- Status: Operating
- Opened: 17 March 1996; 30 years ago
- Owner: Merlin Entertainments
- General manager: Neil Poulter
- Slogan: Awesome Awaits
- Operating season: March to January
- Attendance: 2025: 2,000,000 (▼7%)
- Area: 150 acres (61 ha; 0.61 km^{2})

Attractions
- Total: 55
- Roller coasters: 4
- Water rides: 6
- Website: www.legoland.co.uk

Map of Berkshire, UK, showing the location of Legoland Windsor at 51.46351°N, 0.65114°W (grid reference SU938747)

Legoland Windsor Resort (/ˈlɛɡoʊ.lænd wɪnd.sər/), styled and also known as Legoland Windsor, is a theme park and resort in Windsor, Berkshire in England, themed around the Lego brand. The park opened on 17 March 1996 and is currently operated by Merlin Entertainments. The park's attractions consist of a mixture of Lego-themed rides, models, and building workshops targeted at younger children.

In 2019, the park had 2.43 million visitors, making it the most visited theme park in the United Kingdom. Overall, attendance has steadily risen since 2005. Legoland Windsor regularly draws more attendees than the original Legoland Billund Resort in Denmark; in 2011, it became the tenth-most popular theme park in Europe, a position it has held every year since. Legoland Windsor typically opens from March to January, with closures on some days.

== History ==
In 1987, The Lego Group began research for the development of a second Legoland park after Legoland Billund with over 1000 sites considered. In January 1992, Windsor Safari Park went into receivership and the 150-acre (0.61 km^{2}) site was chosen for the second development. Between 1992 and 1994, planning, design, site preparation and the design and construction of models began. New accommodations were created for the safari animals and services, foundations and infrastructures were installed at the park. In 1995, a scale replica of Big Ben was installed in Miniland whilst other buildings and attractions were becoming established. In September, advance bookings were opened for entrance tickets. Final installations were completed by the beginning of 1996 and at this point, the Legoland Windsor staff-base was recruited. Legoland Windsor opened on 17 March 1996. During its first season, the park attracted over 1.4 million visitors.

In April 2005, The Lego Group decided to sell Legoland parks following losses across the company. On 13 July 2005, Legoland was acquired by the Blackstone Group and control of the parks passed to Merlin Entertainments.

During the 2020 season and start of 2021, the resort was forced to close periodically due to the COVID-19 pandemic. It reopened on 4 July 2020 following a lockdown in the UK.

In May 2021, the resort opened a new land titled Lego Mythica: World of Mythical Creatures which includes the United Kingdom's first flying theater ride, called Flight of the Sky Lion, expanding and replacing the Adventure Land area. Mythica is the first time a Legoland resort has launched a Lego intellectual property not first released as a Lego set.

In September 2023, the Vikings' River Splash river rapids ride permanently closed after 16 years of operation. In 2024 Legoland Windsor opened Minifigure Speedway, a Zierer-manufactured dual-tracked roller coaster located in the Bricktopia area.

== Areas ==
Themed areas and key locations within Legoland Windsor Resort

The park is split into 11 themed lands, incorporating various attractions, restaurants and shops: The Beginning, Duplo Valley, Knight's Kingdom, Lego City, Miniland, Lego Ninjago World, Pirate Shores, Heartlake City, Kingdom of the Pharaohs, Bricktopia, and Lego Mythica: World of Mythical Creatures.

=== The Beginning ===
The Beginning is the entrance area to the park. It is composed of a plaza area containing entrance turnstiles, ticket sales, and toilets and stretches to contain a small part of the resort at the bottom of the funicular railway. It has a view of the area surrounding the resort including the nearby town of Windsor, Heathrow Airport, and parts of London.

The main resort shop, The BIG Shop, is located at The Beginning and is the largest Lego store in the UK. Picsolve operates the Photo Shop, which sells photographs of visitors aboard rides and attractions in the resort.

Food and beverage outlets located at The Beginning include the Hill Top Cafe, a coffee outlet, and the Sweet Stop.

The only ride located in The Beginning is the Hill Train, a 3 ft 6 in (1,067 mm) narrow gauge funicular railway down a curved slope. It is the only ride or attraction to be retained from Windsor Safari Park, being refurbished when the park opened with stained glass windows made from translucent Lego bricks by local school children. It travels 300 metres (980 ft) between two stations, with a height difference between the top and bottom stations of approximately 27 metres (89 ft).

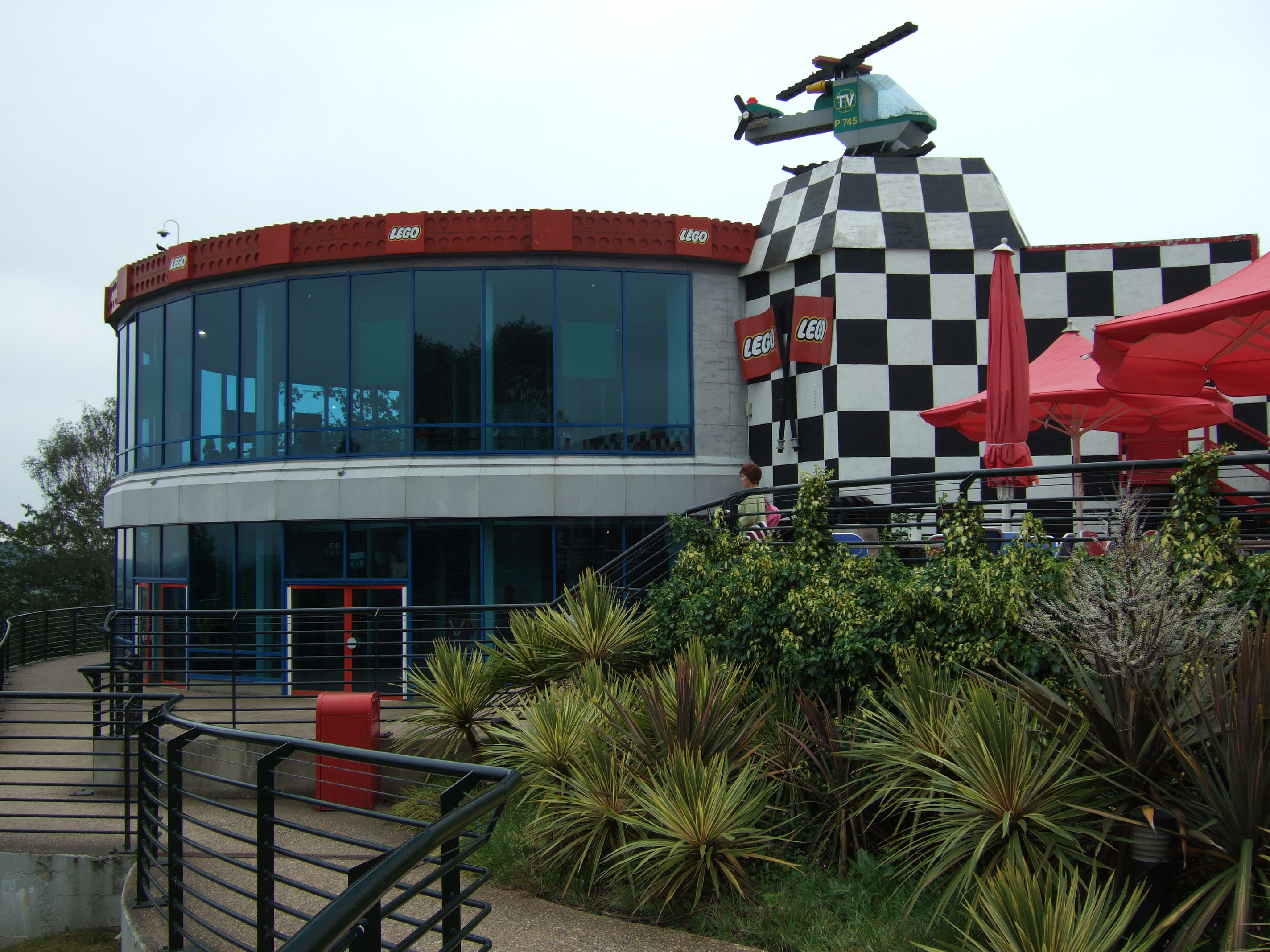
Creation Centre, 2007

The Creation Centre opened at The Beginning in 2000. The building has housed a number of attractions since it has opened; the first main attraction it contained was Lego Racers in which customers created virtual Lego vehicles and raced them against others. The attraction suffered from reliability issues and closed at the end of 2004. It was revived in 2009 by members of the original team under the new name of Rocket Racers. Reliability issues remained and it closed at the end of the weekend of 8–9 October 2011. In 2012 the attraction space was repurposed for Star Wars Miniland which was based on the Star Wars franchise. Unlike Lego Racers and Rocket Racers, it was classed as a walkthrough attraction with no queue. In 2016, a large model of the Death Star was installed as the centrepiece of the attraction. Following the end of a licensing deal between Lucasfilm and Merlin Entertainments, the attraction closed on 31 December 2019.

The Creation Centre is also home to Legoland Windsor's model makers who display busts of famous figures as well as a view of their studio in a space on the second floor of the centre. On the ground floor of the centre is Apocalypseburg which was part of the Lego Movie 2: The Second Part set.

=== Duplo Valley ===
Duplo Valley is a land aimed at smaller children based on the Lego Duplo toy bricks, with the majority of rides being family rides. Since the resort's opening the land has rotated through a number of different names including Explore Land, Duplo Gardens, and Duplo Land.

At the beginning of the 2020 season, Duplo Valley was reopened following a refurbishment and the construction of a new ride, the Duplo Dino Coaster. The ride, originally planned to be called the Duplo Dream Coaster, became the resort's third rollercoaster after The Dragon and the Dragon's Apprentice. Aimed to be a "my first coaster" it saw a soft opening before the park's temporary closure due to the COVID-19 pandemic. It was designed by Mack Rides and manufactured by ART Engineering. Alongside the opening of the new ride was the re-theming of three rides and attractions: Duplo Express (previously Duplo Train), Duplo Airport (previously Duplo Valley Airport, Chopper Squadron, and Whirly Birds) and Duplo Playtown (previously Brickville). Also located in Duplo Valley is Fairy Tale Brook, a boat ride which takes visitors on a course containing models of fairy tale characters.

Duplo Valley is home to the resort's water park which consists of two separate rides and attractions: Drench Towers and Splash Safari. Drench Towers is a water splash area with multiple slides which was placed on land previously occupied by Mole-in-One Mini Golf. Splash Safari is a smaller splash area for toddlers which consists of water features made of Duplo models and is located below Drench Towers.

The Duplo Valley Theatre, a puppet theatre showing puppet shows of classic fairy tales, is located in the valley adjacent to Fairy Tale Brook. A family restaurant, Farmer Joe's Chicken Company, is located opposite the theatre.

=== Knight's Kingdom ===
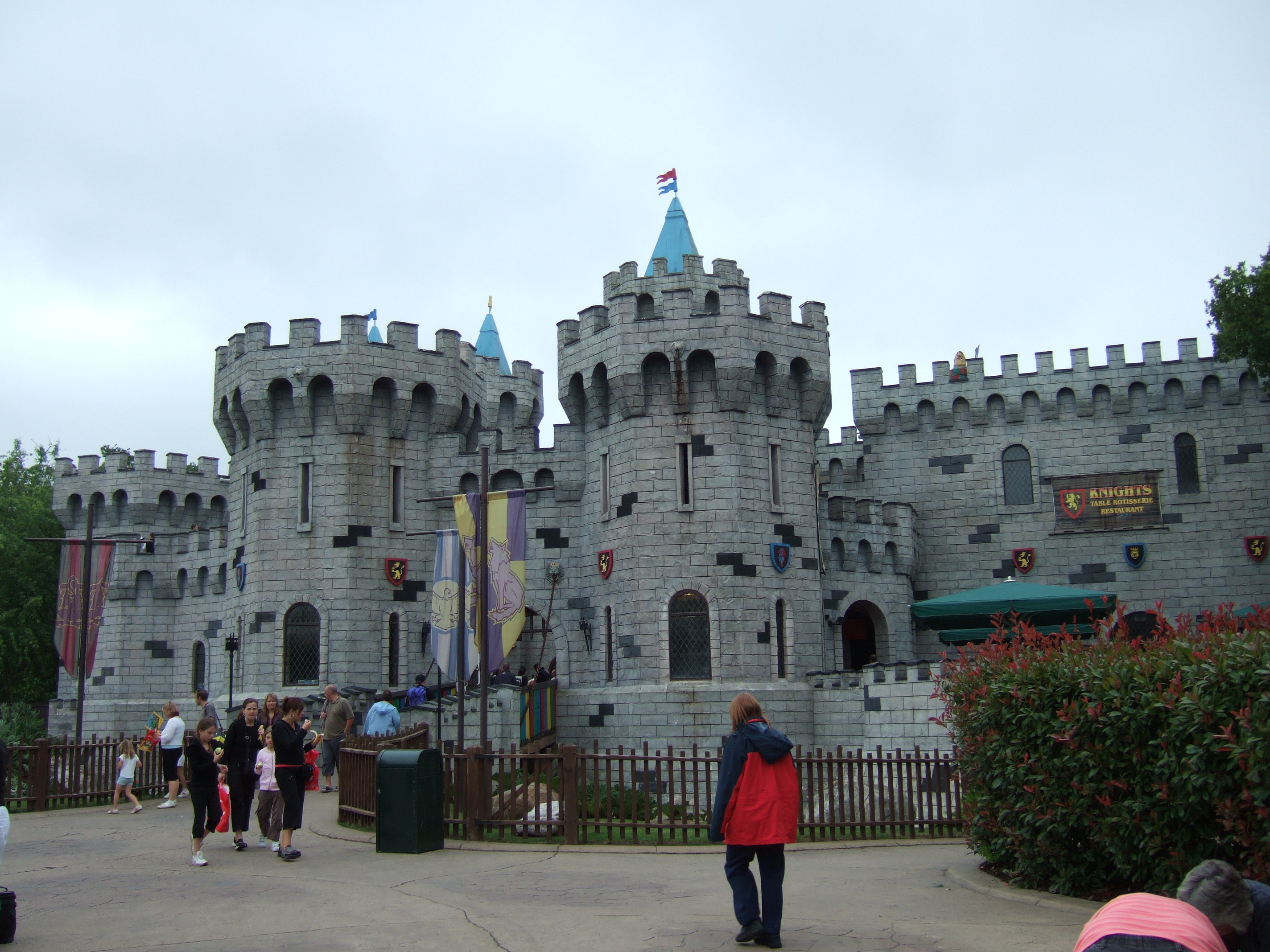
Knight's Kingdom

Knight's Kingdom (originally Castleland and previously NEXO Knight's Kingdom) features The Dragon roller coaster, which starts inside the castle themed station, passing Lego tableaux, before travelling outside reaching a speed of around 30 mph (48 km/h). Other rides in the land are the carousel-style flat ride Merlin's Challenge (previously known as Knight's Quest) and Dragon's Apprentice, a smaller rollercoaster acting as an alternative for shorter visitors not permitted to ride The Dragon.

In previous years, the land has assumed a role as Christmas Kingdom when open in the winter months and houses a grotto in the ride area of The Dragon.

=== Lego City ===
Lego City (formerly known as Traffic), is themed around transport. It features the Balloon School (a simulated hot air balloon ride), Coastguard HQ (a boat school ride for children), Fire Academy, L-Drivers (driving school for children aged 3–5) and City Driving School (driving school for children over 1.1 metres (3 ft 7 in). In 2019, a Vekoma "mad-house" attraction called Haunted House Monster Party was added to the area and in 2020, Atlantis Submarine Voyage by Sea Life (which features "submarine" vehicles used to travel through the tank) was rethemed to become Lego City Deep Sea Adventure.

=== Miniland ===
A limousine within Miniland

Miniland is a miniature park in Lego form, depicting towns and cities from around the world, including London, Edinburgh, Paris, Leuven and Amsterdam, using nearly 40 million Lego bricks. The area features a number of animated models interacting with each other. Motor vehicles use cables under the paths emitting radio wave signals to steer and allow charging when required. The train system runs on tracks, slowing for stations using slow-down bars, and the boats use underwater motor-driven rubber loops as well as sensors to operate bridges and locks. The system, with lights and sounds, is run by 14 computers using 300 kilometres (190 mi) of underground cabling.

The land is divided into different areas as they are depicted, including the UK and mainland Europe. In 2018, Miniland saw an expansion called "Explore the World" which added more Lego models of global sites including the Sydney Opera House, Forbidden Palace, and Saint Basil's Cathedral. The same year various sites from the USA were added.

=== Lego Ninjago World ===
Lego Ninjago World opened in May 2017 based upon the Ninjago TV series. The centrepiece attraction is a 4D interactive ride, Lego Ninjago The Ride: The Ride manufactured by Triotech. The zone features the relocated and rebranded ride Destiny's Bounty, a Rockin' Tug ride based on the ship in the TV series. The ride was previously known as Longboat Invader, and opened in 2008.

=== Pirate Shores ===
Pirate Shores features a log flume, Pirate Falls, a play area, a pirate ship ride named the Jolly Rocker and the Spinning Spider (a teacups-style ride where visitors ride in log-style gondolas as an animatronic Lego spider gnashes its jaws and breathes smoke on a web above). From 1996 to 2010, this area was known as Wild Woods.

=== Heartlake City ===
Heartlake City (formerly Lego City until redecoration in 2015), based on the Lego Friends product range, includes two rides: The Legoland Express (a railway ride around Kingdom of the Pharaohs), and a Disk'O coaster called Mia's Riding Adventure (renamed Autumn’s Riding Adventure in 2024). Captain Redbeard and the Legend of the Golden Cutlass (a pirate stunt show) and Lego Friends to the Rescue (a live music concert) take place around the harbour performed by the Lego Friends.

=== Kingdom of the Pharaohs ===
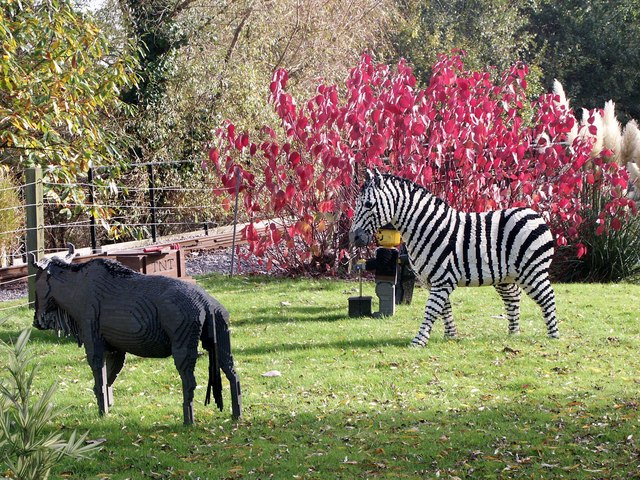
Lego brick animals

The Kingdom of the Pharaohs contains Laser Raiders, an interactive dark ride through an Egyptian tomb where visitors shoot targets to gain points. Also in this area are Scarab Bouncers, Aero Nomad, Desert Chase, and Thunder Blazer. The latter three rides are fairground based attractions such as a carousel, a Ferris wheel and a chair-o-planes ride.

=== Bricktopia ===
Bricktopia (previously called Imagination and Imagination Centre) is an area themed around education through Lego. The centre piece is the Legoland Learning Academy (previously Lego Education Centre) which offers National Curriculum workshops. In 2019 the academy was awarded Best Venue for STEM Learning.

The only ride in Bricktopia is Minifigure Speedway, a pair of family duelling rollercoasters themed as two motor racing teams, Team All Stars and Team Legends.

The Sky Rider attraction was previously located in Bricktopia, which was an elevated track ride opened in March 1996 and refurbished between the 2001 and 2002 seasons. The ride gave visitors views of Miniland. It was closed permanently in 2024.

Bricktopia includes Lego Studios 4D (previously known as the Imagination Theatre) which shows Lego-themed films. In the 2020 season, these were Lego City 4D – Officer in Pursuit, Lego Ninjago – Master of the 4th Dimension, and Lego Dreamzzz 4D - Z-Blob Rescue Rush.

In 2023, the Lego Reef was replaced with LEGO Ferrari Build and Race.

=== Lego Mythica: World of Mythical Creatures ===
Opening in 2021, Mythica is a land based where Adventure Land was previously located. The centrepiece is Flight of the Sky Lion, a flying theatre ride. Also in the land are two drop towers and the re-themed S.Q.U.I.D. Surfer ride known as Hydra's Challenge.

Annual attendance at Legoland Windsor
Year	Attendance	Ref.
2005	1,400,000	
2006	1,480,000	
2007	1,650,000	
2008	1,815,000	
2009	1,900,000	
2010	1,900,000	
2011	1,900,000	
2012	2,000,000	
2013	2,050,000	
2014	2,200,000	
2015	2,250,000	
2016	2,183,000	
2017	2,200,000	
2018	2,315,000	
2019	2,430,000	

== Resort hotels ==
Legoland Windsor Resort currently has two hotels and one complex of lodges.

=== Legoland Hotel ===
The Legoland Hotel opened in March 2012. it is located at the back of the park, in the Adventure land section, on the old site of the Jungle Coaster. Visitors enter the hotel on the ground floor but enter the park on the second floor. The hotel is home to the Bricks Restaurant (a buffet) and the Skyline Bar, both on the second floor. The resort has featured various Lego themed rooms. Customers of the hotels have access to the pirate-themed indoor pool and fitness facility (located at the Legoland Hotel), a treasure hunt in each room, and access to select park attractions before the general public enters the park. The second floor includes a loft where Lego video games can be played on PlayStation 4 consoles. The ground floor features a Lego store and bins of bricks for building.

=== Castle Hotel ===
The Legoland Castle Hotel opened on 1 July 2017. The hotel was opened by competition winner James Waine who designed a model that was built by professional model makers and put outside the hotel. The hotel offers wizard- and knight-themed rooms. The hotel is only accessible from the park; visitors must check-in at the Legoland Hotel and travel through the hotel and the park to reach the Castle Hotel. The Castle Hotel is located next to the Legoland Hotel, and includes the Tournament Tavern restaurant.

=== Woodland Village ===
In Legoland Windsor's ten-year plan, the park expressed interest in building a holiday village of 450 lodges ranging from barrel-style glamping to large family lodges. This idea culminated in the Woodland Village. The village opened on 24 May 2024. It has Lego themed rooms. There are two types of lodges, Premium and standard. The Premium lodge has a separate children's bedroom with a Flat screen TV, a Lego build pit, and bunk beds. The main lodge can accommodate up to 7 people, and has a lounge with a leather sofa.

== Rides and attractions ==
=== Operating rides ===
Name	Park Area	Opened	Manufacturer	Image	Description
Aero Nomad	Kingdom of the Pharaohs	1996 (rethemed 2009)	Zamperla		A small ferris wheel ride offering views over Kingdom of the Pharaohs and the centre of the park. Originally named Brickadilly's Ferris Wheel when opened in 1996; rebranded Aero Nomad in 2009.
Autumn's Riding Adventure	Heartlake City	2015	Zamperla		A Zamperla Disko ride where visitors can board Lego horses and spin in to the air.
Balloon School	Lego City	1999	WGH Ltd		A ride containing six balloon gondolas (each holding four riders), attached to arms linked to a central turning arm. Balloons can be raised or lowered at the riders' command.
Castaway Camp	Pirate Shores	2014			A large adventure playground for children based upon a Pirate ship and features towers, slides and climbing nets. Replaced the original Pirates Training Camp play area.
Desert Chase	Kingdom of the Pharaohs	1996 (rethemed 2009)	Bertazzon		A small carousel located within the Kingdom of the Pharaohs area at Legoland Windsor. Originally named Brickadilly's Carousel at the park's opening in 1996, renamed Desert Chase in 2009.
Destiny's Bounty	Ninjago World	2008 (rethemed 2017)	Zamperla		A Rockin' Tug ride originally located in Land of the Vikings as Longboat Invaders, which opened in 2008. Renamed to Destiny's Bounty in 2017.
Dragon's Apprentice	Knight's Kingdom	1999	WGH Ltd		A smaller companion to the park's larger coaster, The Dragon.
Drench Towers	Duplo Valley	2013 (rethemed 2013)	Unknown		A water play structure themed Lego Duplo featuring a tipping water brick and various coloured slides. Only open during summer months.
Duplo Airport	Duplo Valley	1996 (rethemed 2020)	Zamperla		An attraction where two riders can control a Lego Duplo-style helicopter, by using a lever to guide it up or down. Originally named Whirly Birds at the park's opening in 1996; renamed to Chopper Squadron (2006) and then Duplo Valley Airport (2013).
Duplo Dino Coaster	Duplo Valley	2020	ART Engineering		A Duplo-themed roller coaster for younger visitors.
Duplo Express	Duplo Valley	1996 (rethemed 2020)	Unknown		A small train completing a small circuit.
Duplo Playtown	Duplo Valley	2013 (rethemed 2020)	Unknown		A playground for children based upon a town created from Lego Duplo bricks.
Fairy Tale Brook	Duplo Valley	1996	WGH Ltd		A gentle boat ride where visitors pass through Lego depictions of fairytale scenes (such as Aladdin, Little Red Riding Hood, and Snow White and the Seven Dwarfs) in a leaf-shaped boat. Revised in 2013.
Ferrari Build and Race	Bricktopia	2023	Merlin Magic Making		LEGO Brick Building attraction where guests can build a LEGO Car to race both on physical tracks and a virtual one.
Fire Academy	Lego City	2005	Metallbau Emmeln		Groups of four can enter a fire engine to compete against other visitors to extinguish the fire in a building by using levers to power the truck down a track to the building, exit the truck and use water pumps to aim at fire in the windows of said building. After powering the truck back to the starting line, the first team back wins.
Fire and Ice Freefall	Lego Mythica: World of Mythical Creatures	2021	Zierer		Two drop towers
Flight of the Sky Lion	Lego Mythica: World of Mythical Creatures	2021	Brogent Technologies		UK's first flying theatre
The Haunted House Monster Party	Lego City	2019	Vekoma		A madhouse attraction. The ride is similar to Hex at Alton Towers and The Haunting at Drayton Manor.
Hill Train	The Beginning; Land of the Vikings/Kingdom of the Pharaohs	Before 1991 (opened as part of Windsor Safari Park)	WGH Ltd		A funicular railway shuttling visitors between the top and centre of the park down a hill. There are two trains, each feature three carriages (one red, one blue, one yellow) which pass each other on the journey. This feature was carried over from Windsor Safari Park.
Hydra's Challenge	Lego Mythica: World of Mythical Creatures	2000 (rethemed 2021)	Zierer		Dual water carousel
Jolly Rocker	Pirate Shores	2010	Huss		Originally situated at another park, Jolly Rocker is a rocking pirate ship that seats 35 people and opened in 2010.
Laser Raiders	Kingdom of the Pharaohs	2009	Sally Corporation		Riders travel in a cart through interactive scenes and user laser guns to shoot targets and earn points.
L-Drivers	Lego City	1996	Garmendale		A smaller version of Driving School for younger visitors between the heights of 0.9 metres (2 ft 11 in) and 1.1 metres (3 ft 7 in).
Lego City Coastguard HQ	Lego City	1996	Legoland (track/course); Garmendale (boats)		Visitors can drive electric Lego-style boats through a course, accompanied by a mixture of Lego and plastic 3D models. Originally named Boating School at the park's opening in 1996, renamed Coastguard HQ in 2015.
Lego City Deep Sea Adventure	Lego City	2011 (rethemed 2020)	Mack Rides		An underwater submarine ride that takes riders on a journey through an aquarium. The ride was refurbished and renamed from Atlantis Submarine Voyage to Lego City Deep Sea Adventure in 2020.
Lego City Driving School	Lego City	1996	Garmendale		People between 1.1 metres (3 ft 7 in) and 1.5 metres (4 ft 11 in) can drive Lego-style miniature electric cars through a series of roads featuring a range of Lego models and 3D scenes.
Legoland Express	Heartlake City	1996	Severn Lamb		A train ride that seats 150 that begins in Heartlake City and travels past Kingdom of the Pharaohs (through the queue line of Laser Raiders) and travels through Lego City before returning to Heartlake City, and features Lego constructions of various animals (originally to represent Lego character Johnny Thunder's expeditions), and Johnny Thunder himself. It also features areas where watching visitors can push buttons to activate water sprays from the mouths of models, such as a tiger. Originally named I-Spy Express at the park's opening in 1996; subsequently renamed Adventurers' Express (2002), Orient Expedition (2005), and Heartlake Express (2015).
Merlin's Challenge	Knight's Kingdom	2005 (rethemed 2020)	Mack Rides		A Mack Old Train ride, originally located in Adventure Land (opened in 2005 as Dino Dipper) but moved to allow for construction of Atlantis Submarine Voyage. Renamed to Knight's Quest in 2011. Renamed to Merlin's Challenge in 2020. Riders spin quickly in a circle over bumps in a Lego train.
Minifigure Speedway	Bricktopia	2024	Zierer		Two family dueling coasters opened on the former Raft Racers site. The two red and blue tracks are dubbed Team Allstars and Team Legends respectively.
Ninjago: The Ride	Ninjago World	2017	Triotech		A dark ride where riders use their hands to shoot. Themed around the Ninjago TV show.
Pirate Falls: Treasure Quest	Pirate Shores	1996	Zamperla		A traditional log flume ride featuring various Lego depictions of pirates based upon a story of a rivalry between two crews. Originally named Pirate Falls at the park's opening in 1996; renamed to Pirate Falls Dynamite Drench (2010) and then Pirate Falls Treasure Quest (2014). Treasure Quest is the name of the play area within the queue line of the ride.
Scarab Bouncers	Kingdom of the Pharaohs	2009	S&S Worldwide		Two small frog-hopper style drop towers that can each sit six children and one adult.
Splash Safari	Duplo Valley	2013	Unknown		A small water playground featuring Duplo characters, replacing the Waterworks attraction which occupied the area prior to 2012.
Spinning Spider	Pirate Shores (formerly in Land of the Vikings)	1996	Intamin		A spinning teacups-style attractions where riders sit in log-style gondolas as an animatronic Lego spider gnashes its jaws and breathes smoke on a web above.
The Brick	Miniland	2022	Legoland		A large room lined with counters full of hundreds of thousands of Lego bricks.
The Dragon	Knight's Kingdom	1998	WGH Ltd		Riders travel in a dragon rollercoaster train through a dark-ride section in a castle featuring scenes of animated Lego models before accelerating up a lift hill and completing two figure-of-eight circuits before returning to the station.
Thunder Blazer	Kingdom of the Pharaohs	1996 (rethemed 2009)	Bertazzon		A small chair-o-plane swing ride. Originally named Brickadilly's Chair-O-Plane in 1996 when the park opened; renamed to Thunder Blazer in 2009.

=== Former rides and attractions ===
Name	Park Area	Year Opened	Year Closed	Manufacturer	Image	Description
Bum Shaker	Wild Woods (Pirates Landing)	1996	2000			Two hand-pump on-track cart ride circuits near the Rat Trap. Removed and replaced by The Truck Stop which was later replaced in 2009 to make room for Jolly Rocker.
Muscle Maker	Wild Woods (Pirates Landing)	1996	2003			Two hand-pump on-track cart ride circuits near the Rat Trap. Removed and replaced by The Truck Stop which was later replaced in 2009 to make room for Jolly Rocker.
Explorers' Institute	Lego City	1996	2008			A walk-through attraction themed around a rainforest, ancient Egypt and the Arctic.
Magic Theatre	Lego City	1996	2007			Showcasing illusions using Lego models.
Rat Trap	Wild Woods	1996	2013			A multi-level, outdoor children's adventure playground. Revamped as Pirate's Training Camp in 2010 before being replaced by Castaway Camp for 2014.
Mole-in-One Mini Golf	Duplo Valley	2007	2013			Known as Wild Woods Golf during construction; replaced with Drench Tower.
Sky Rider	Bricktopia	1997	2024	Premier Rides		An elevated car ride. Originally riders pedalled their car around a track overlooking Miniland and the Imagination Centre. After 2001, the ride was converted to have self-powered cars and reversed direction.
Space Tower	Imagination Centre	1997	2017	Sunkid Heege		A children's tower ride in which guests sit in seats and can pull themselves up the tower with a rope as it rotates.
Raft Racers	Duplo Valley	1999	2021	WhiteWater West		Visitors can ride a rubber dinghy along one of two coloured slides down a bank. Originally named Extreme Team Challenge when the ride opened in 1999; subsequently renamed to Raft Racers in 2013. Removed in 2022 to make way for Minifigure Speedway.
Lego Racers	The Beginning	2000	2011	Attention to Detail		An interactive virtual racing attraction based on the Lego Racers product line, housed in the Creation Centre. Eight drivers select vehicle components on a touchscreen computer before racing against each other using arcade-style seated controls. Renamed 'Rocket Racers' in 2002. Closed in 2004, later reopened in 2009.
Jungle Coaster	Adventure Land	2004	2009	Mack		A large Wild Mouse roller coaster, now located in Legoland Florida as Great Lego Race. Removed due to noise complaints by residents, the land was later used for the Legoland Hotel.
Dino Safari	Adventure Land	2005	2015	Metallbau Emmeln		A vintage cars style ride with Lego dinosaurs and other models to look at. Riders sit in a Lego jeep car which is on a guide rail. The attraction closed at the end of the 2015 season to make way for the Lego castle hotel. A similar version of this ride can be found at Legoland Florida where there it is known as safari trek and is still operating.
Vikings' River Splash	Land of the Vikings	2007	2023	ABC Rides		A river rapids attraction. Riders travel through scenes featuring Lego models of Vikings and dragons and pass a viewing point where riders can squirt using pump water guns. The ride concludes with bucketfuls of water being tipped and a climb back to the station. Permanently closed on 25 September 2023.
Discovery Zone featuring Mindstorms	Imagination Centre	2007	2021			Home to the park's National Curriculum relevant Educational Workshops. In this attraction visitors can construct Lego models and program robots in various workshops.

== Future development ==
2027

Bricktopia area refresh, including a new 4D Cinema attraction. Known as Project Prism, the area will be based around 'speed', tieing in to the recent Minifigure Speedway addition.

2028

A new roller coaster located on the previous site of the Viking River Splash. It is said to be an expansion of an existing land and thus likely LEGO Ninjago World, and widely speculated to be a Mack Rides Spinning Coaster, akin to recent overseas additions such as Masters of Spinjitzu at Legoland Korea.

Beyond

Management are reportedly planning a new 'IP area', in hopes of raising attendance up to 2.5m visitors a year, in time for the opening of Universal Studios Great Britain in 2031.

== Queue reduction systems ==
For the 2008 season, the Q-Bot queuing system was introduced. For a per-person fee, customers were provided with a small pager-like device to "reserve" places in queues virtually, allowing them to use their queuing time elsewhere in the park. The initial contract between Q-Bot developers Lo-Q was for one year from 8 April 2008. This contract was extended for 2009 before a new three-year contract was signed on 26 March 2010. Three tiers of the device were available at different prices which reduced the queue time by different proportions.

In 2020, the Q-Bot system was replaced by the Merlin-developed Reserve And Ride, which functioned the same as Q-Bot, but instead worked through a web app on your phone. Two years later, this system was implemented at Chessington World of Adventures as well.

Reserve & Ride was short-lived, as from the start of the 2026 season, the system was replaced with the Merlin-wide Fastrack system, which has a set allocation of uses (depending on tier and price), allowing you to access a shorter queue a specified amount of times. This allows you to manage your day by choosing which attractions you would like a reduced waiting time on. You can choose to use one of the Fastrack allocations at any of the listed attractions. Once you have used all your allocation of rides, the ticket will become inactive.

Separate to the mainstream queue reduction systems is the Ride Access Pass (RAP), which started in the early 2010s across Merlin's UK theme parks to help guests who couldn't use the standard queuing system. The original form of this at Legoland involved guests using physical timecards which they would take to the RAP entrance of the ride they wanted to go on. A staff member would write on their timecard when their next ride could be, then when that time came, the cycle would repeat.

The second form of RAP, which arrived alongside Reserve And Ride used the R&R web app, and worked in the exact same way as it; Thorpe Park and Alton Towers continued to use the old timecard system, and Chessington World of Adventures used it until 2022 when it joined Legoland in using Reserve And Ride. The system changed the system slightly in 2024, when it started requiring people to pre-book their passes. The system in this form was used at the park until the end of the 2025 season.

In early 2026, it was announced that Merlin had partnered with Nimbus Disability to create a new Ride Access Pass app that would be used as the main system across all Merlin UK theme parks. However, they also announced that they would be holding a trial where the only people who could use the pass would be restricted to those with physical mobility, level access, or urgent toilet needs, which excluded those with neurodivergence (e.g., autism, ADHD, anxiety). Going further, anyone who had a pass before this point due to neurodivergence would have their RAP revoked. Following major backlash and a petition from over 25,000 individuals, Merlin cancelled this trial and reverted to their original eligibility criteria. The app works nearly the same as the Reserve and Ride system before it, except you have to check-in to each ride by scanning a QR code outside of it.

== Incidents ==
- In 2006, a fire broke out in a storage barn onsite during the end of season fireworks on 28 October, with no injuries.
- In October 2007, a fire broke out in a shed being used to store chemicals.
- In 2008, after noise complaints, Jungle Coaster plastic housing was placed over the cars, leading to reduced capacity to two adults per car, due to weight restrictions. However, at the end of the 2009 season, the ride was removed and the site was used for hotel construction.
- In September 2010, the park's large number of wasps during the season was discussed on Watchdog, with general manager Sue Kemp appearing with host Anne Robinson and confirming new signage, actions and details on the website.
- In February 2014, the park cancelled a private event organised by Islamic cleric Haitham al-Haddad due to safety reasons following a backlash and threats by nationalist groups.
- In August 2016, two six-year-old girls were sexually assaulted while at the resort, leading to a police investigation over the incident.
- On 26 July 2017, stuntman Brendan Pollitt suffered a broken spine and numerous other injuries after falling backwards off a 'Russian Swing' on to a wooden platform whilst performing in the Return To Skeleton Bay live action stunt show.
- In 2019, a five-year-old boy was involved in an accessibility dispute at Ninjago: the Ride, making national news. It was settled in late 2020.
- On 31 July 2022, a fire broke out on the entrance to the Legoland Hotel.
- On 3 May 2024, a woman was arrested for neglect of a child after her 5-month-old child suffered a cardiac arrest the day prior in the Coastguard HQ queue line. The child died in the hospital a couple of days later.

== Awards ==
Since opening in 1996, the park has won a number of awards, including the UK's Number One Family Attraction by Group Leisure Magazine, 1999.

== See also ==
- Legoland Discovery Centre
- DreamWorks Tours: Shrek's Adventure!
- Universal Studios Great Britain
