= Joyland (Great Yarmouth) =

Historic amusement park in Norfolk, England

- Joyland's famous snails
- Interactive map of Joyland
- Location: Great Yarmouth, Norfolk, England
- Coordinates: 52.6079°N 1.7376°E
- Opened: 1949
- Owner: Coles Amusement Enterprises

Attractions
- Total: 4 major rides, With 5 smaller rides
- Roller coasters: Spook Express, Tyrolean Tubs, Snails
- Website: www.joyland.org.uk

Joyland is a historic free entry amusement park located in Great Yarmouth, Norfolk, on the coast of East Anglia. The theme park opened in 1949 on the site of the former Anchor Gardens next to Britannia Pier.

The park is famous locally and across the country for the Snails and Tyrolean Tubs rides designed and manufactured by engineering entrepreneur Horace Cole and the family-owned engineering business. The Tyrolean Tubs is notable as the only Virginia Reel roller coaster (albeit in miniature form) in operation in the world.

== History ==
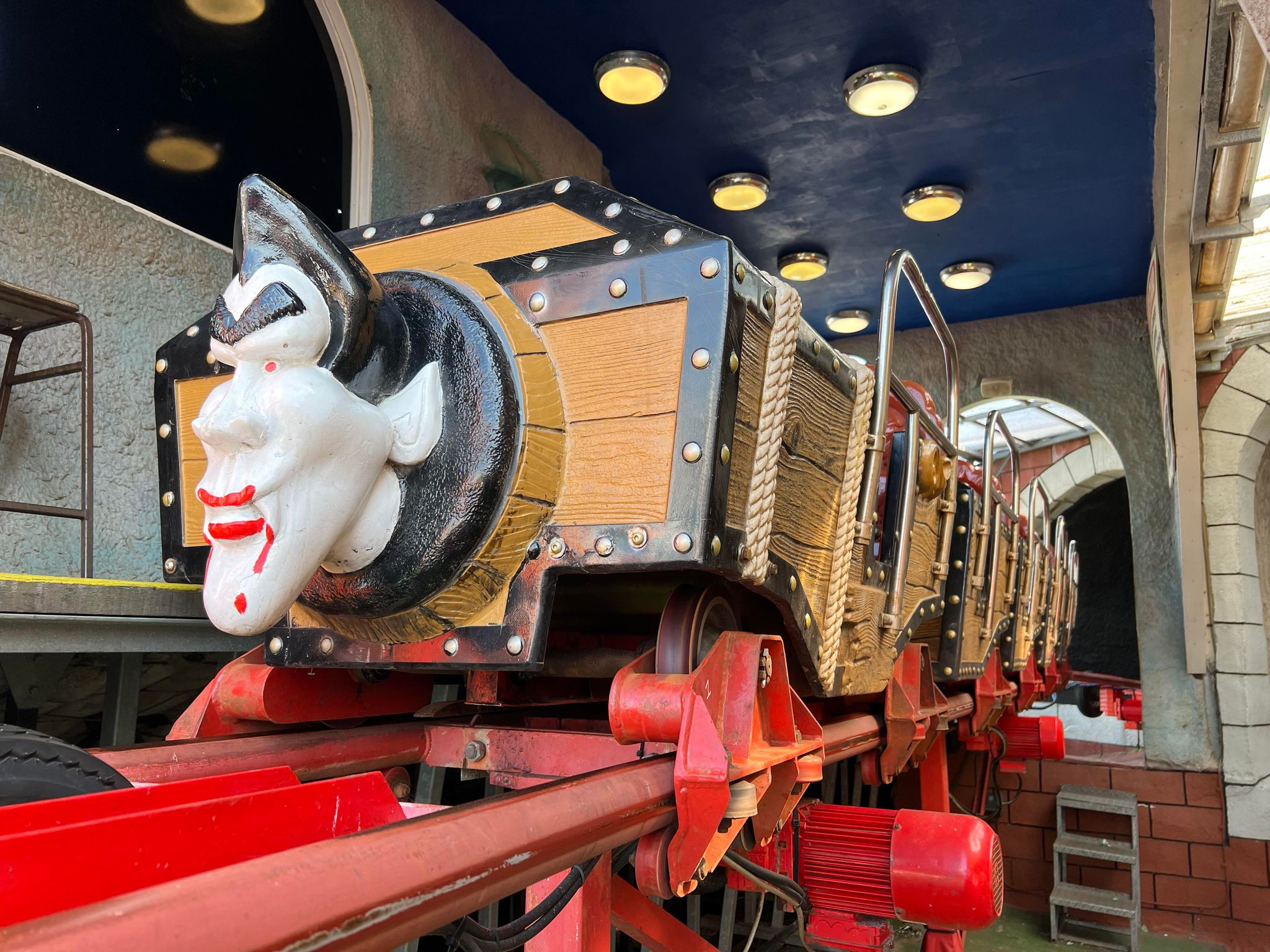
Spook Express ride

Joyland is renowned for its heritage rides, which have remained unchanged through generations of patrons, allowing parents to share the rides remembered from their childhood with their children.

The biggest change to the park occurred in 1984 when the main centerpiece of the park (a 1950s Noah's Ark ride) was removed and replaced with a space shuttle attraction called the "Space Base" and then again in 1996 when the centrepiece was demolished and replaced by a spooky themed roller coaster twisting around the peak of the mountain while various fiberglass toy figurines adorn the side of the large green mountain.

== Current rides and attractions ==
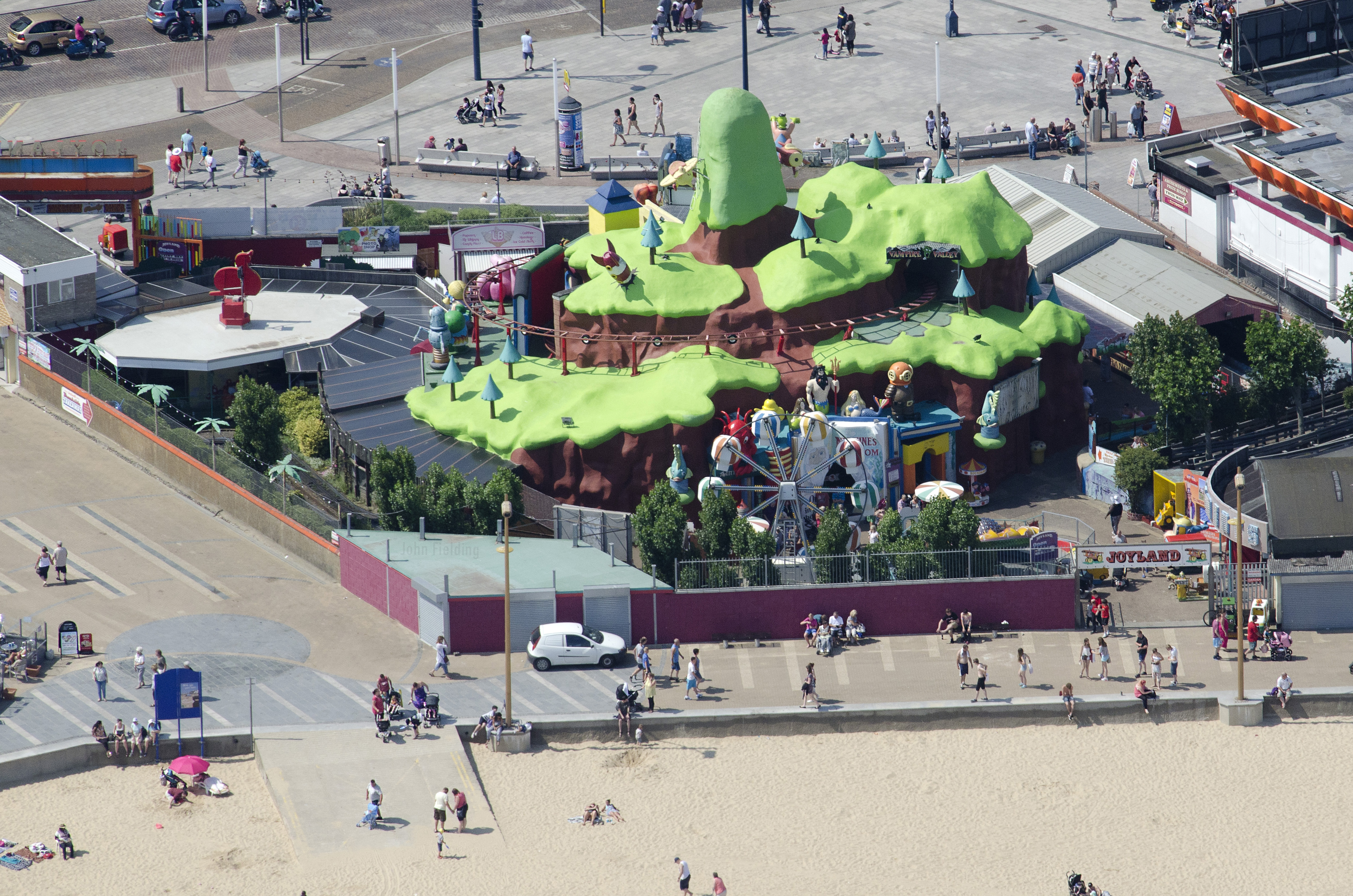
Aerial view

As of April 2015, Joyland hosts the following rides:

- Snails (1949)
  A unique snail ride designed by Horace Cole travelling through the park with various scenic elements such as garden gnomes, Frogs, A pond and much more.
- Tyrolean Tubs (1949)

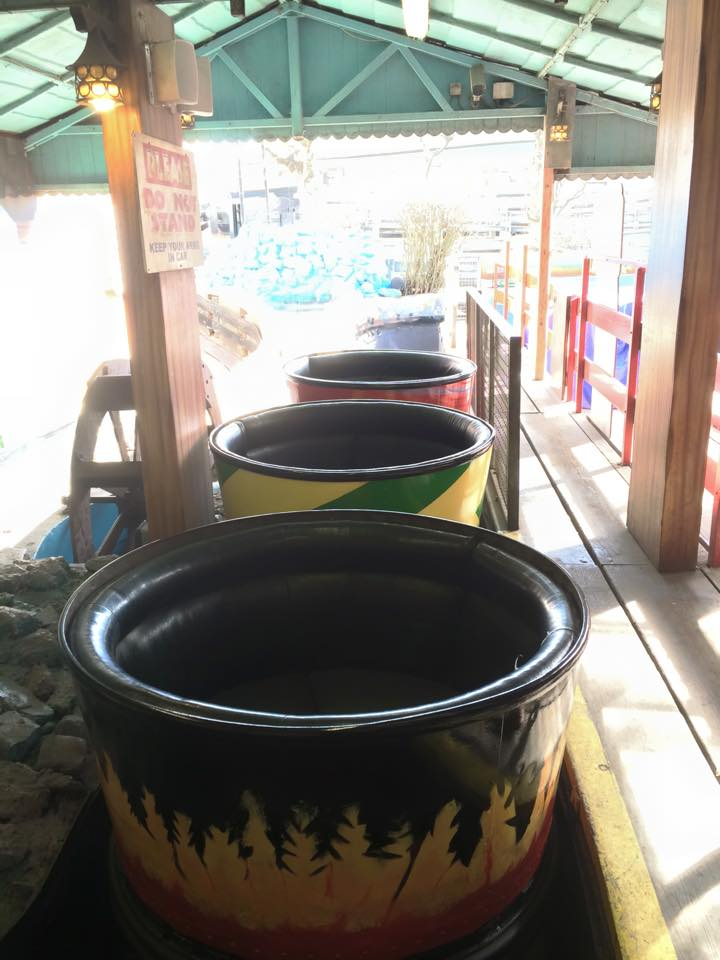
Joyland's Tyrolean Tubs

- Designed by Horace Cole. Circular "Tubs" wind their way through mountainous scenery spinning and changing direction unexpectedly throughout the duration of the ride before returning to the station.
- Jet Cars (1974)
  Designed by Horace Cole. Six jet cars travel on a circular track through the inside of the mountain.
- Neptune's Kingdom (1974)
  Designed by Horace Cole. Relocated from the Cole family's other park Never Never Land in Gorleston-on-Sea in 1973. A themed ride whereby the rider travels through the inside of the "Mountain" in a seahorse car through sea and water related scenery.
- Pirate Ship (1986)
  Built by Modern Products. A pirate ship swings up and down entertaining children and adults.
- Major Orbit (1992)
  Built by Modern Products. A circular space-themed children's ride which spins and tilts upwar
- Skydiver (1995)
  Built by S&W Amusement. An enclosed ride spins riders up in the air imitating that of a skydiver.
- Junior Ferris Wheel (1999)
  Built by S&W Amusement. A small Ferris wheel looking over Great Yarmouth Beach.
- Spook Express (1998)
  Built by WGH Ltd. A children's rollercoaster travelling around the summit of the "Mountain", Curving inwards through a dark cave where spooky sound effects play in the darkness.
- Convoy Trucks (2026)
  Built by Idees Loisirs. A small Formula 3000 tracked ride located at the back of the park inside the arcade.

== Gallery ==
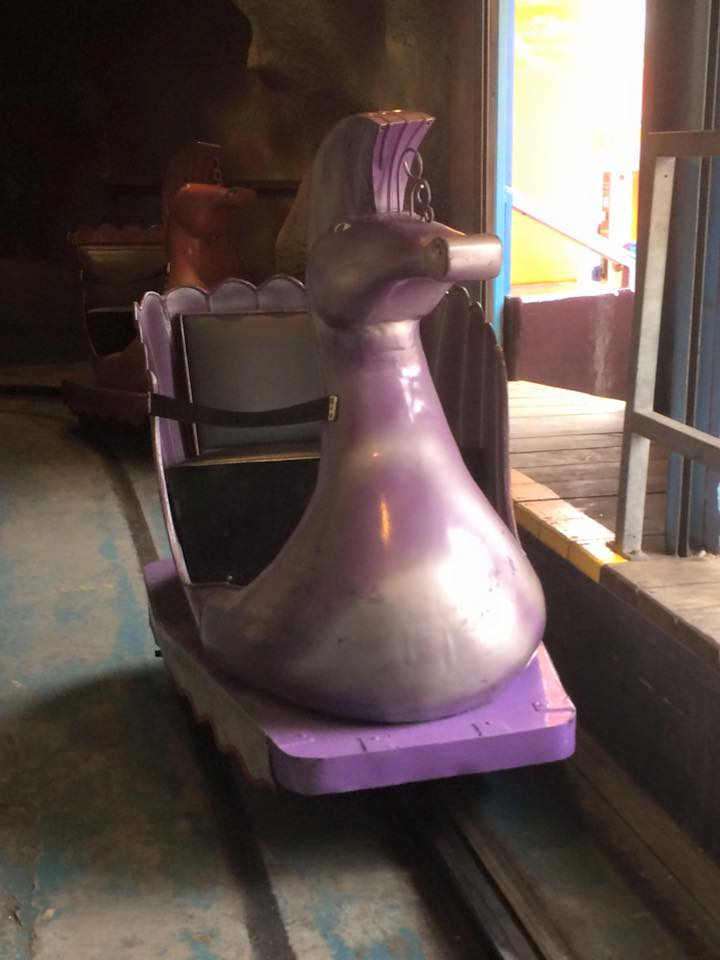
Seahorses at Neptunes Kingdom Joyland Great Yarmouth

== See also ==
- List of British Theme Parks
