= Hotel Legoland (Windsor) =

Coordinates: 51.4648°N 0.6455°W

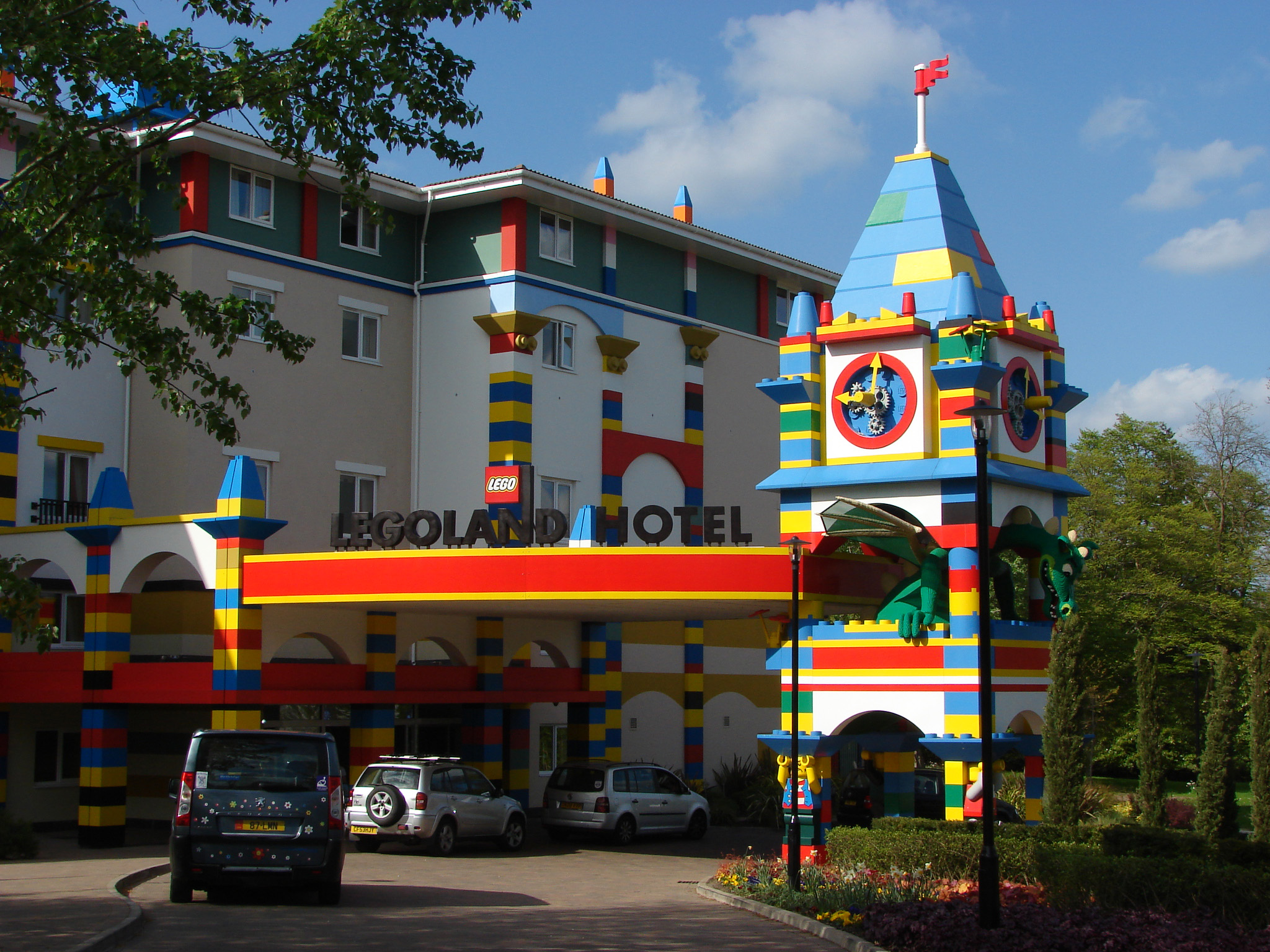
- Entrance of the hotel
- Interactive map of the Hotel Legoland area

General information
- Location: Winkfield Road, Windsor, Berkshire, United Kingdom
- Opened: 17 March 2012; 14 years ago
- Owner: Merlin Entertainments
- Management: Merlin Entertainments

Technical details
- Floor count: 4

Design and construction
- Developer: Merlin Entertainments

Other information
- Number of rooms: 150
- Number of restaurants: 2
- Parking: On-site guest parking

Website
- official website

Hotel Legoland Windsor (also known as the LEGOLAND Windsor Resort Hotel) is a hotel located within the grounds of Legoland Windsor Resort in Windsor, Berkshire, England. The hotel opened in 2012 and has Lego-themed designs, primarily for people visiting the adjacent theme park.

== Location ==
The hotel is located on Winkfield Road in Windsor, adjacent to the Legoland Windsor Resort. Guests staying at the hotel may access the Legoland before the general public. The location is approximately a 10-minute drive from Windsor Castle and about 20 minutes from Heathrow Airport.

== Facilities ==
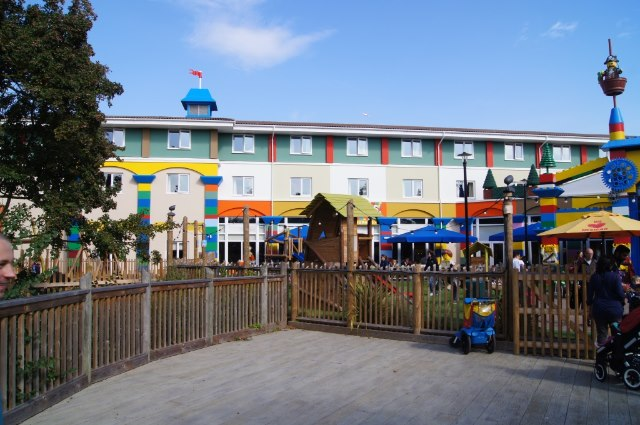
Side view of the hotel

The hotel offers child-oriented facilities, including a pirate-themed indoor swimming pool, Lego building areas and a sensory room with interactive elements. A Lego sculpture and themed interior design elements are featured throughout the premises. Dining options include the Skyline Bar and the Bricks Family Restaurant. The Tournament Tavern, located in a nearby hotel, provides alternative dining.

== Rooms ==
The hotel has 150 rooms designed with themes based on Lego franchises, including Pirate, Kingdom, Adventure, Lego Friends and Ninjago. Rooms include separate sleeping areas for children, bunk beds, Lego bricks and themed decorations. Some rooms feature digital check-in or amenities.

== Reception ==
The hotel has received mostly positive reviews for its thematic elements and proximity to the park. Criticism has been directed at food service and overall value.
