= Helter skelter (ride) =

Type of amusement ride

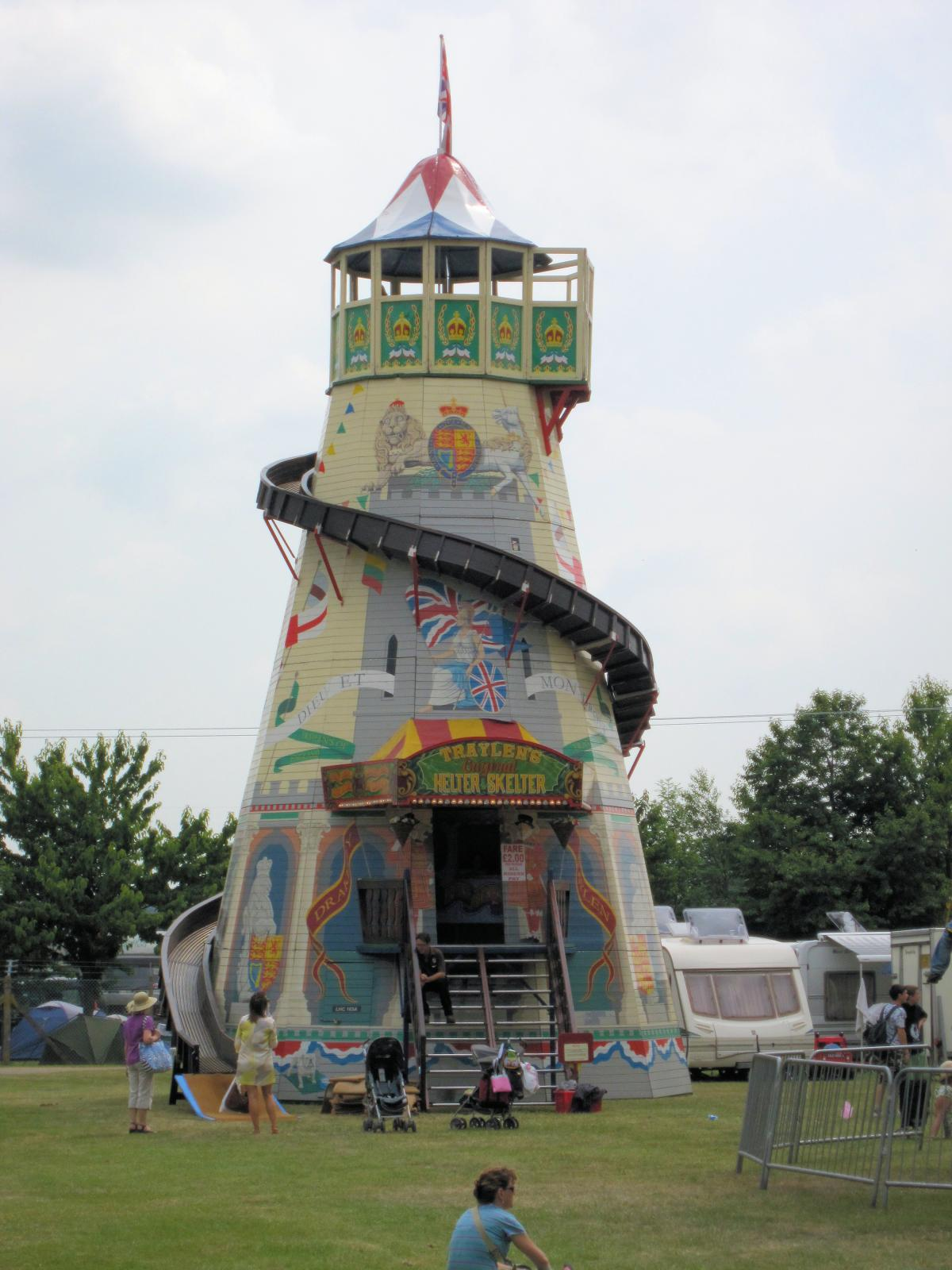
A helter skelter at the Royal Norfolk Show, near Easton, Norfolk, England

A helter skelter, or helter-skelter lighthouse, is an amusement ride resembling a lighthouse with a spiral shaped slide built around the tower. Typically, fairgoers climb up a flight of stairs inside the tower and slide down the spiral on the outside using a coir mat. The ride is most prevalent in amusement parks and fairgrounds in the United Kingdom.

== History ==
The first known appearance of the helter skelter was at Blackpool Pleasure Beach in 1906, which survived for twenty-nine years until 1935. However, the ride's development began around the turn of the 20th century, when a helter skelter was built on Great Yarmouth's new Britannia Pier.

The helter skelter was also present at Dreamland in Margate, Kent. This amusement park was similar in appearance to Blackpool Pleasure Beach during its opening in 1920, which was marked by the opening of the Scenic Railway as a key attraction. In the 1920s, visitors at Dreamland would have experienced both more modern and permanent rides such as the House of Nonsense and the Tumble Bug, as well as traditional rides like the Helter Skelter.

Fairground rides like the helter skelter appeared not only in amusement parks during the nineteenth and twentieth centuries, but were also popular on seafronts, piers and other convenient spots of land. Birnbeck Pier at Weston-super-Mare in North Somerset is one such example, with a helter skelter being one of its entertainment facilities in the twentieth century.

== Etymology ==
The term helter-skelter has origins stemming from the word kelter or kilter, meaning working order or alignment. In reconstructed Anglo-French, this translates to eschelture, or "the state of being in military formation". Kelter was subsequently used to describe the correct configuration of the parts of artillery pieces. Nonetheless, the Latin preposition oltre, meaning "beyond" was added to eschelture. The resulting Middle English phrase, helter-skelter, was adapted from the Anglo-French and Latin terms based on the pattern of reduplicative compounds, with the resulting meaning being "out of formation" and "in disordered haste, confusedly".

== Design ==
The tower on the helter skelter is generally a wooden or aluminium construction, whereas the chute of the slide is usually made from laminated wood. Instead of climbing up a flight of stairs to reach the top of the slide, some helter skelters included an escalator-like lift that fairgoers were loaded onto, and this updated mechanism maintained technical consistency amongst the amusement park rides. This technology was based on familiar transport and factory mechanisms such as electric winches, cogs, ratchets and hydraulic valves. Yet, the familiarity of these mechanisms was understood by fairgoers as modern in an amusement park context, which added to the novelty factor of the ride.

== Variants ==
Whilst the traditional British helter skelter resembled a lighthouse, many other variations of the helter skelter have different features and have adopted different themes, including variations on the spiral slide.

Variations on the lighthouse helter skelter include Thomas Warwick's slide at Cleethorpes in North East Lincolnshire, England, as well as Manchester White City's Dragon Slide. Rather than the traditional lighthouse tower, Thomas Warwick's slide was shaped like a castle tower with turrets at the top. It was built by Thomas Warwick, who also gave the town their first observation tower and subsequent swing ride. Manchester White City's Dragon Slide, also called The Holland Slide, kept the lighthouse theme, but instead featured a decorative slide around the tower, which was designed to look like a dragon, with the dragon's head at the bottom.

The Hurry Skurry is another noteworthy variation of the helter-skelter. The Hurry Skurry included a slide which zigzagged down the structure rather than spiralling around it and examples existed at Crystal Palace in London, and on the Birnbeck Pier at Weston-super-Mare

The Bowl Slide was introduced at Blackpool Pleasure Beach in 1911, and the popularity of this ride saw further development occur into the 1920s and 1930s, where examples of the slide surfaced at the Whitley Bay Spanish City in North Tyneside, the Kursaal at Southend-on-Sea, and Southport Pleasureland.

== In popular culture ==
The helter skelter was the subject and inspiration of the song of the same name by the Beatles from The White Album. Paul McCartney explained that he was "using the symbol of a helter-skelter as a ride from the top to the bottom--the rise and fall of the Roman Empire--and this was the fall, the demise, the going down."

Upon listening to the album, American criminal Charles Manson interpreted Helter Skelter as a call to violence, and so the song came to embody his Family's internal belief system, leading to their goal to incite an apocalyptic race war. In 1969, Manson and his followers murdered Sharon Tate and four others in her Los Angeles home of 10050 Cielo Drive, and the murder of a grocery store owner and his wife the following night. At this second crime scene, a misspelling of the term "helter-skelter" was found written in blood, which stopped McCartney from performing the song live for many years to come.

The ride has also been featured in Planet Coaster 2.

== See also ==
- Fun slide
