= Great Yarmouth Pleasure Beach =

Historic amusement park in Norfolk, England

Pleasure Beach Great Yarmouth
- Pleasure Beach logo
- Interactive map of Pleasure Beach Great Yarmouth
- Location: Great Yarmouth, Norfolk, England
- Coordinates: 52.593742°N 1.736076°E
- Opened: 24 July 1909
- Owner: Pleasure & Leisure Corporation Ltd
- Operating season: Sat 21st March – Sun 1st November 2026

Attractions
- Total: 26
- Roller coasters: 4
- Website: www.pleasure-beach.co.uk

The Pleasure Beach Great Yarmouth is an amusement park in the seaside resort of Great Yarmouth, Norfolk, on England’s east coast. It opened in 1909. The largest and most popular ride at the park is the wooden Roller Coaster which opened in 1932. There are also 25 other large rides at the park, as well as children's entertainment, amusement arcades, catering facilities, a sweet shop and ice cream parlours.

== History ==
In 1909 Charles B. Cochran applied to the local council to lease an area of sand dunes on the beach to develop an amusement park. His application was successful and sand dunes south of Nelson's Gardens were let to Cochran on which he constructed an L. A. Thompson scenic railway to the designs of William Napier. The Scenic Railway opened on 24 July 1909 along with the Katzenjammer Castle, which was a funhouse-style attraction. The following year, the Scenic Railway was clad in plaster sculpted to resemble mountainous terrain and decorated with lights, as was common for such rides at the time. A new ride, The River Caves, also opened. The park operated at a modest level until the outbreak of World War I, after which lease of the site passed to John Henry Iles.

Iles had secured the rights to construct L. A. Thompson's scenic railway rides in Britain, and the Scenic Railway at Pleasure Beach at the time was one of Iles's rides. It was extensively damaged by fire in April 1919 and a large section of the track and support structure was destroyed. The ride was quickly rebuilt, however, and opened later that same year. Under Iles's management, the site expanded throughout the 1920s to encompass much of the area still used today. A variety of rides were installed, including Jack and Jill, Noah's Ark and Over The Falls. In 1925, a huge water chute was installed, which operated until 1928. Iles's lease of the site expired at the end of 1928 and the Council favoured an application for lease from showman Pat Collins. Iles removed his Scenic Railway and his involvement in the site came to an end.

Pat Collins' son John was appointed to oversee day-to-day operations of the park. The Collinses installed a Figure 8 roller coaster and the prototype circular water chute, which had been designed by German showman Hugo Haase, both of which opened in 1929. In 1931 Pat and John visited the Colonial Exhibition in Paris where there was an amusement park among the attractions. The largest ride there was a scenic railway operated by Hugo Haase, who the Collinses had recently done business with. At the close of the Exhibition, Collins purchased the ride for Pleasure Beach and it was dismantled, shipped to England and erected in the park. The ride, now called Roller Coaster, opened on 14 May 1932 and has been operational since. It remains the most popular ride at Pleasure Beach and it is now a rare example of the scenic railway design of roller coaster—being one of only two such rides left in the UK (the other being the Scenic Railway at Dreamland Amusement Park, Margate) and one of only seven in the world. In common with most scenic railways, a 'brakesperson' is required to ride with the train to control its speed and to stop it at the end of the ride, as there are no brakes on the track.

By the 1950s, John Collins had endeavors elsewhere and could not commit the time to Pleasure Beach it needed. He sublet the site to Botton Brothers Limited ahead of the 1954 season. This was a company formed by brothers Albert and James Botton, who had operated various rides and attractions at travelling fairs and static parks around the south-east of England since 1942. Albert Botton moved to Great Yarmouth to oversee day-to-day operations of the park and a policy of annual improvement commenced. Some of the rides that were at the Pleasure Beach during this time included The Jets, Satellite, Paratrooper, Sky Wheels and Swirl. Botton Brothers also installed their Gallopers near the entrance to Pleasure Beach in 1954.

Albert Botton died in 1975 and management of the park passed to Jimmy Jones, who had married Albert and his wife Lottie's daughter, Jane Botton. Jimmy Jones was managing director throughout the rest of the 1970s and 1980s. In 1982, the pop group Madness recorded scenes for their music video for their song "House of Fun" at Pleasure Beach. In 1992 the various Botton Brothers companies were amalgamated into one company called Pleasure & Leisure Corporation PLC and freehold of the Pleasure Beach site was purchased at the end of 1993. At this time, Jimmy Jones ceded the role of managing director to his son Albert Jones. The Pleasure Beach Gardens opened in 1996. The Gardens are advertised as a place to relax away from the noise and excitement of the main park. The Gardens include Sara's Tearooms, a themed miniature golf course, refreshment kiosk, junior go-karts, Jurassic Gardens and an Upside Down House.

== Current operation ==
Pleasure & Leisure Corporation PLC were one of two applicants to reach the final stage in bidding for the large casino licence which was granted to Great Yarmouth Borough Council in 2007. The proposal for a complex called 'The Edge', to comprise a cinema, bowling alley, Premier Inn hotel and Beefeater restaurant, to be built on land south of the Pleasure Beach site, was accepted. However, the project was beset by various delays and ultimately significantly scaled back to remove the casino. An 81-bedroom Premier Inn hotel and a Beefeater restaurant, along with a new car park, opened in June 2019.

The company operating Pleasure Beach became a limited company in 2020. Managing director Albert Jones is assisted by his sons Jamie and Aaron Jones, who are also directors, and the third generation of Jones's to operate the park. Pleasure Beach continued operating during 2020 and 2021, despite concerns for closure due to the impact of the COVID-19 pandemic on tourism. New events, such as Coaster Cabana and Fairground Frights have proven popular and won awards.

== Current rides and attractions ==
Name	Opened	Description
4-D Cinema	2010	An enclosed attraction for 31 people which shows a 3-D film and combines it with physical effects to generate a sense of presence
Big Apple Coaster	1998	A small steel coaster with caterpillar shaped train which seats 24 riders. Goes around the track three times, made by Fabbri and originally operated at Alton Towers.
Bonanza Horses	1990	A small children's ride in which riders sit on horse-shaped cars which move along a track whilst nodding up and down
Cups & Saucers	1993	A small classic cups & saucers ride for children
Disk'O	2004	A Zamperla Disk'O where 24 riders sit facing outwards on a large disk which then rotates and moves along a curved track
Dodgems	1969	A 20-car dodgem track with modern cars
Family Star	2013	A Fabbri spinning roller coaster ride
Floaty Boaty	2022	This ride is similar to Disk'O, and features a boat-themed gondola which rotates while travelling along a curved track.
Flying Dumbo	2017	Each of the twelve cars are mounted on articulated armatures connected to a rotating hub. The ride itself rotates at a constant speed.
Fun Factory	1960	An enclosed walk-through show with moving floors. The Fun Factory had a major refit at the beginning of 2018.
Gallopers	1954	Manufactured by Savages of King's Lynn in 1915, this carousel has 30 horses and 2 chariots.
Ghost Ship	2024	This huge swinging Ghost Ship themed gondola is another fantastic ride built by the SBF Visa Group. Up to 33 passengers swing on an A-frame back and forth high into the air.
Haunted Hotel	1992	An enclosed dark ride with 2-person cars travelling through a themed haunted hotel
Leo's Jungle Journey	2025	Hop on board the Jungle Bus and join Leo on safari. Keep your eyes peeled, and you might see some amazing animals on your journey!
Lightning 360	2020	Lightning 360 is a 'tower planes' ride built by Italian amusement ride manufacturer SBF Visa Group. Eight arms each support a two-seater plane. The arms rotate and ascend the tower. Each plane can rotate 360 degrees, controlled by the rider.
Monorail	1987	The Monorail has 8 cars which seat 4 persons each and covers most of the southern end of the park.
Pendulum	2022	This ride seats 16 facing outward in a circle which rotates at the end of a long, swinging arm.
Polar Express	2024	This circular thrill ride features 20 cars and a "kiss cover". It is said to whip those brave enough round and round as they enjoy fast paced music to accompany the attraction's icy blast of speed.
Raft Ride	2008	This ride has 8 two-person seats which rotate and move up and down independently when a small button is pressed by the rider.
Reverse Time	2017	Holds 24 riders in a circular configuration facing outwards. As the ride starts to spin, it is lifted into the air with the supporting turntable rotating in the opposite direction.
Roller Coaster	1932	The largest ride at the park is this wooden scenic railway roller coaster. This featured in the Madness video for the single "House of Fun".
Sky Drop	2004	A Zamperla 22-metre-high drop tower ride in which riders in the 16-seat gondola ascend and rapidly descend the tower
Snails and Fairy Tails	1967	A fantasy-themed, partially enclosed ride where riders sit in 'Snails' which move along a track through a variety of scenes
Twister	1999	A classical twister ride, seating 2 per car in the 12 cars
Whirlwind	2015	A figure eight rollercoaster consisting of four cars with up to four people in each car sat back to back. As the train flies round the track the cars spin independently of each other.
YoYo	2000	A small children's swing ride with 8 seats suspended from arms which rotate around a central point.

== See also ==
- List of amusement parks in the United Kingdom
