= Jimmy Godden =

Jimmy Godden may refer to:

- Jimmy Godden (actor) (1879–1955), stage actor and concert pianist
- Jimmy Godden (entrepreneur) (died 2012), Kent businessman
