= Paris Colonial Exposition =

Paris Exposition of 1931

Coordinates: 48.83°N 2.41°E

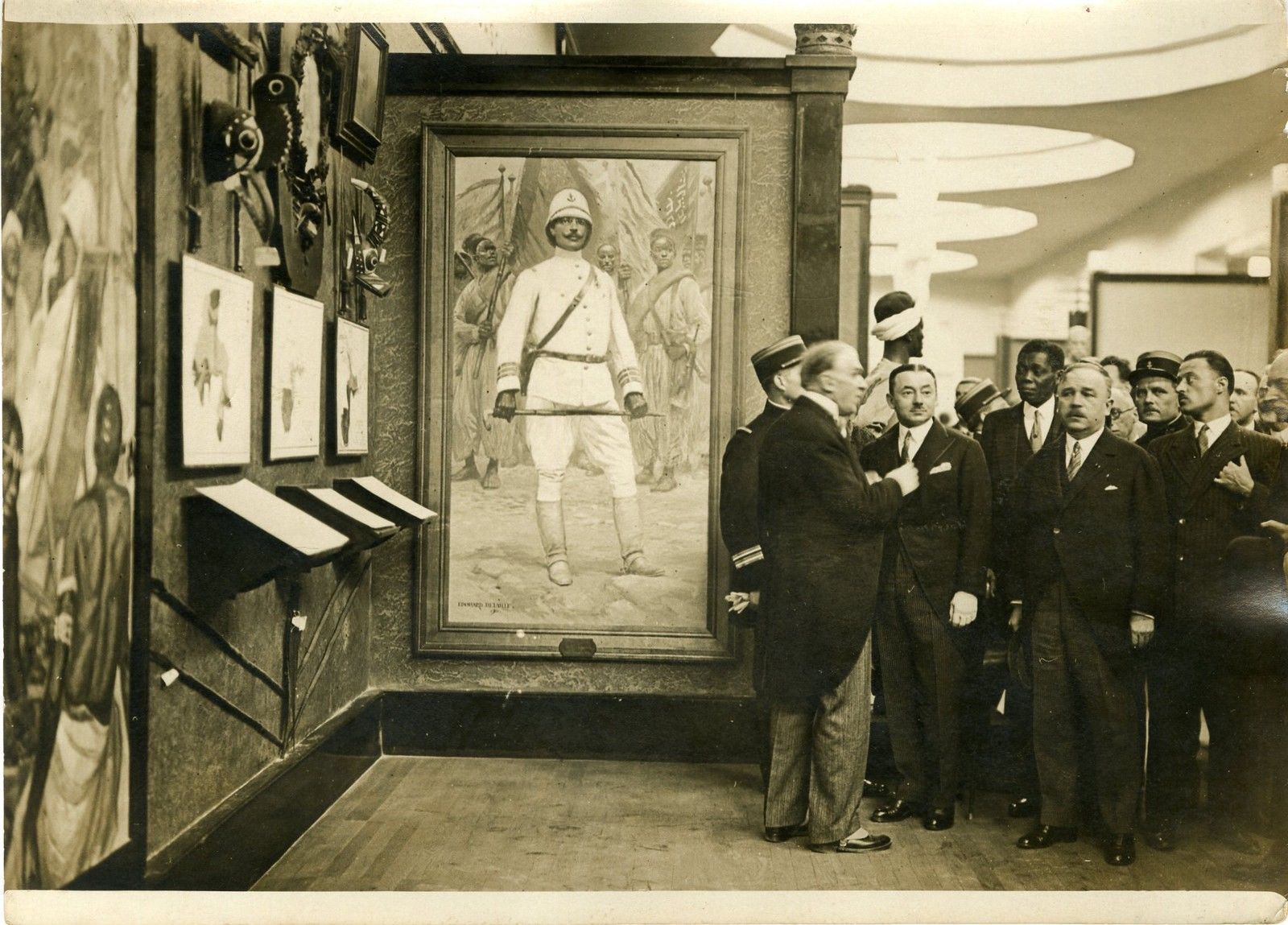
Inauguration of the Musée des colonies during the Exposition

Bird's eye view of the exhibition grounds

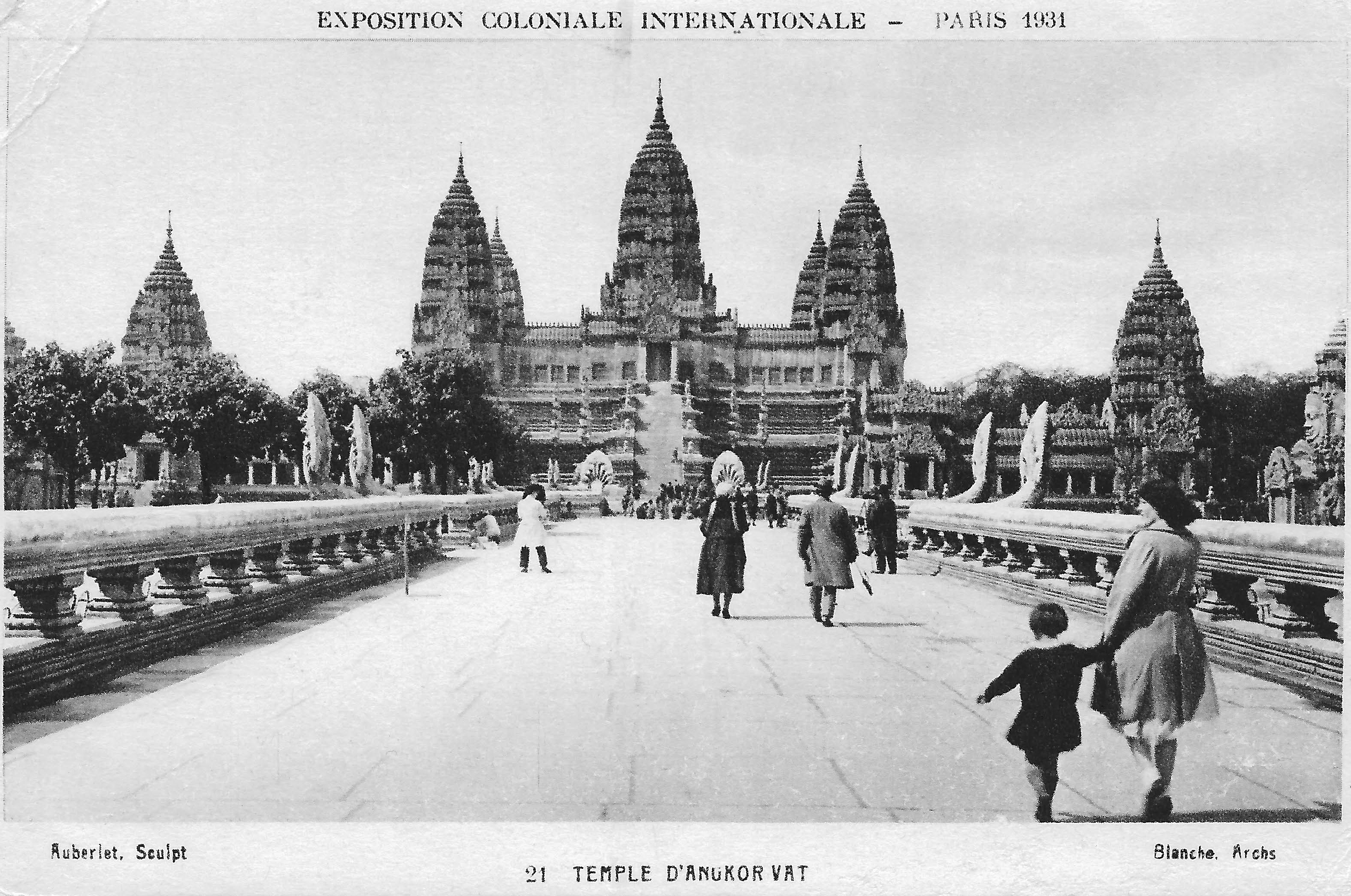
The replica of the Cambodian temple at Angkor Wat

The Paris Colonial Exhibition (or "Exposition coloniale internationale", International Colonial Exhibition) was a six-month colonial exhibition held in Paris, France, in 1931 that attempted to display the diverse cultures and immense resources of France's colonial possessions.

== History ==
The exposition opened on 6 May 1931 in the Bois de Vincennes on the eastern outskirts of Paris. The scale was enormous. It is estimated that from 7 to 9 million visitors came from over the world. The French government brought people from the colonies to Paris and had them create native arts and crafts and perform in grandly scaled reproductions of their native architectural styles such as huts or temples. Other nations participated in the event, including the Netherlands, Belgium, Italy (with a pavilion designed by Armando Brasini), Japan, Portugal, and the United States.

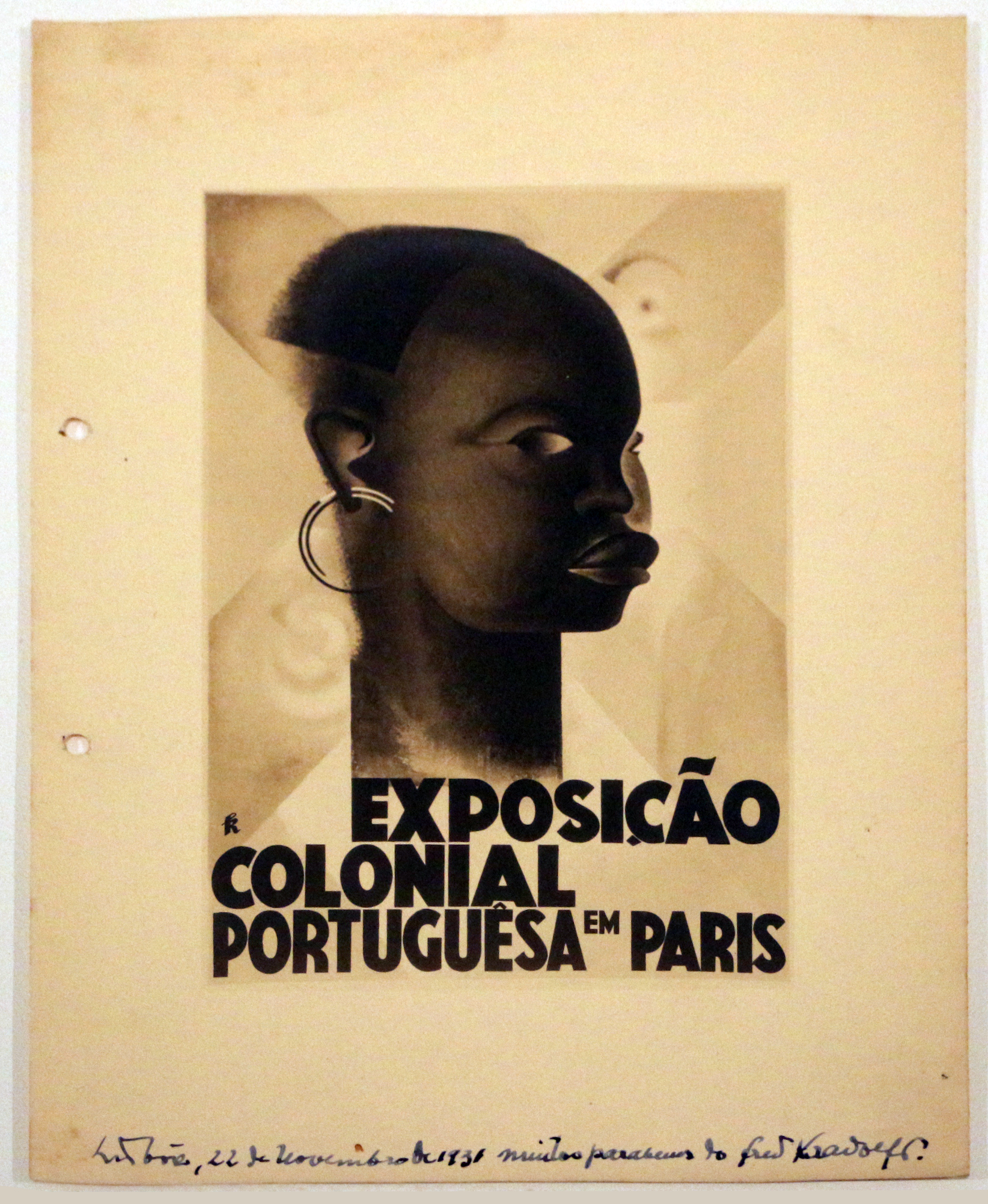
Booklet presenting the Portuguese contribution to the exposition

Politically, France hoped the exposition would paint its colonial empire in a beneficial light, showing the mutual exchange of cultures and the benefit of France's efforts overseas. This would thus negate German criticisms that France was "the exploiter of colonial societies [and] the agent of miscegenation and decadence". The exposition highlighted the endemic cultures of the colonies and downplayed French efforts to spread its own language and culture abroad, thus advancing the notion that France was associating with colonised societies, not assimilating them.

The Colonial Exposition provided a forum for the discussion of colonialism in general and of French colonies specifically. French authorities published over 3,000 reports during the six-month period and held over 100 congresses. The exposition served as a vehicle for colonial writers to publicise their works, and it created a market in Paris for various ethnic cuisines, particularly North African and Vietnamese. Filmmakers chose French colonies as the subjects of their works. The Permanent Colonial Museum (today the Cité nationale de l'histoire de l'immigration) opened at the end of the exposition. The colonial service experienced a boost in applications.

26 territories of the empire participated in the Colonial Exposition Issue of postage stamps issued in conjunction with the Exposition.

== The Palestine Pavilion ==
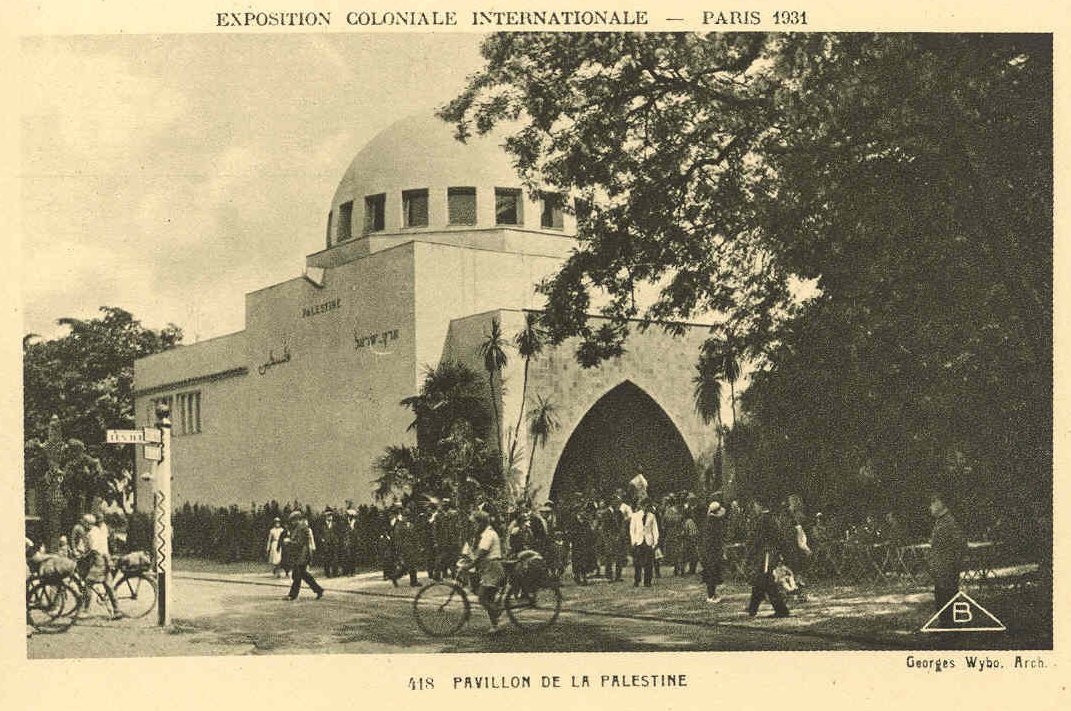
The Palestine (Eretz Israel in Hebrew) pavilion.

The British Empire could not present or erect any pavilions of its colonial positions. The only pavilion that was thus associated with the British was the Palestine pavilion (in Hebrew the Eretz Israel pavilion). Designed by the French architect Georges Wybo, the pavilion was inspired by Rachel's tomb.The exhibition exposed the Yishuv's industrial and cultural progress. One room showcased models of the Hebrew University of Jerusalem, the Ruthenberg power plant, photographs of Tel Aviv as well as industrial and agricultural goods. The second room showed the history of the yishuv, showing the history of the development and the various organizations involved. In addition to those rooms were expositions of furniture, fabrics and books. There was also an art exhibition in which the artists, Yitzhak Frenkel, Moshe Castel, Sionna Tagger and others exposed their paintings.

== The Dutch colonial pavilion fire incident ==
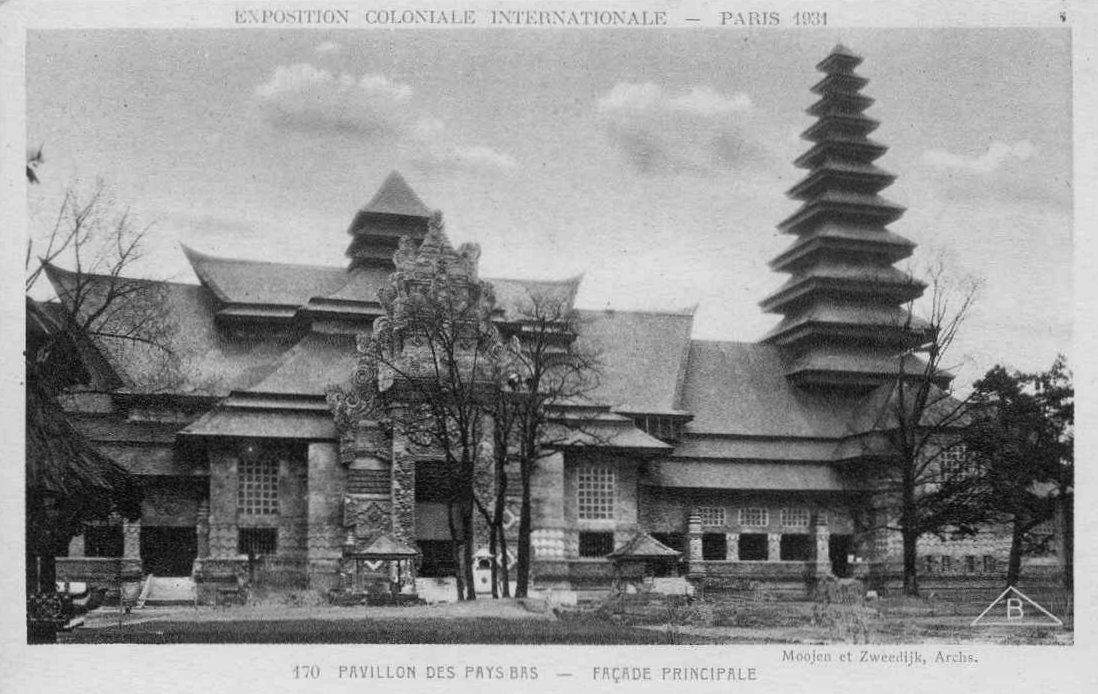
The Dutch colonial pavilion in the Exposition. This pavilion burned down in a fire on 28 June 1931, destroying some important collections.

As one of the important colonial powers at that time, the Dutch Empire participated in the Exhibition. The Netherlands presented a cultural synthesis from their colony, the Dutch East Indies (now Indonesia). However, on 28 June 1931, a fire burnt down the Dutch pavilion, along with all cultural objects displayed inside.^{;}

Only a few artefacts could be salvaged, including an ancient Javanese bronze Shiva statue, which is now kept in the National Museum of Indonesia. The cause of this massive fire was never identified, and there was speculation at the time that it may have been caused by a short circuit, by flammable building materials that were a fire hazard, or by arsonist sabotage. The material and cultural losses were estimated to be around almost 80 million francs. It was said that the French government paid the Netherlands Indies colonial government for its losses. The money was then used for an expansion of the Bataviaasch Genootschap museum.

== Communist counter-exhibition ==
At the request of the Communist International (Comintern), a smaller counter-exhibition entitled The Truth About the Colonies, organized by the Communist Party and the CGTU, attracted very few visitors (5,000 in 8 months). The first section was dedicated to abuses committed during the colonial conquests, and quoted Albert Londres and André Gide's criticisms of forced labour in the colonies while the second one made a comparison of Soviet "nationalities policy" to "imperialist colonialism".

== Posterity ==
Some of these buildings were preserved or moved:

- Palais de la Porte Dorée, Former-musée national des Arts d'Afrique et d'Océanie, current Cité nationale de l'histoire de l'immigration, porte Dorée in Paris, constructed from 1928 to 1931 by the architects Albert Laprade, Léon Bazin and Léon Jaussely.
- The foundations of the Parc zoologique de Vincennes

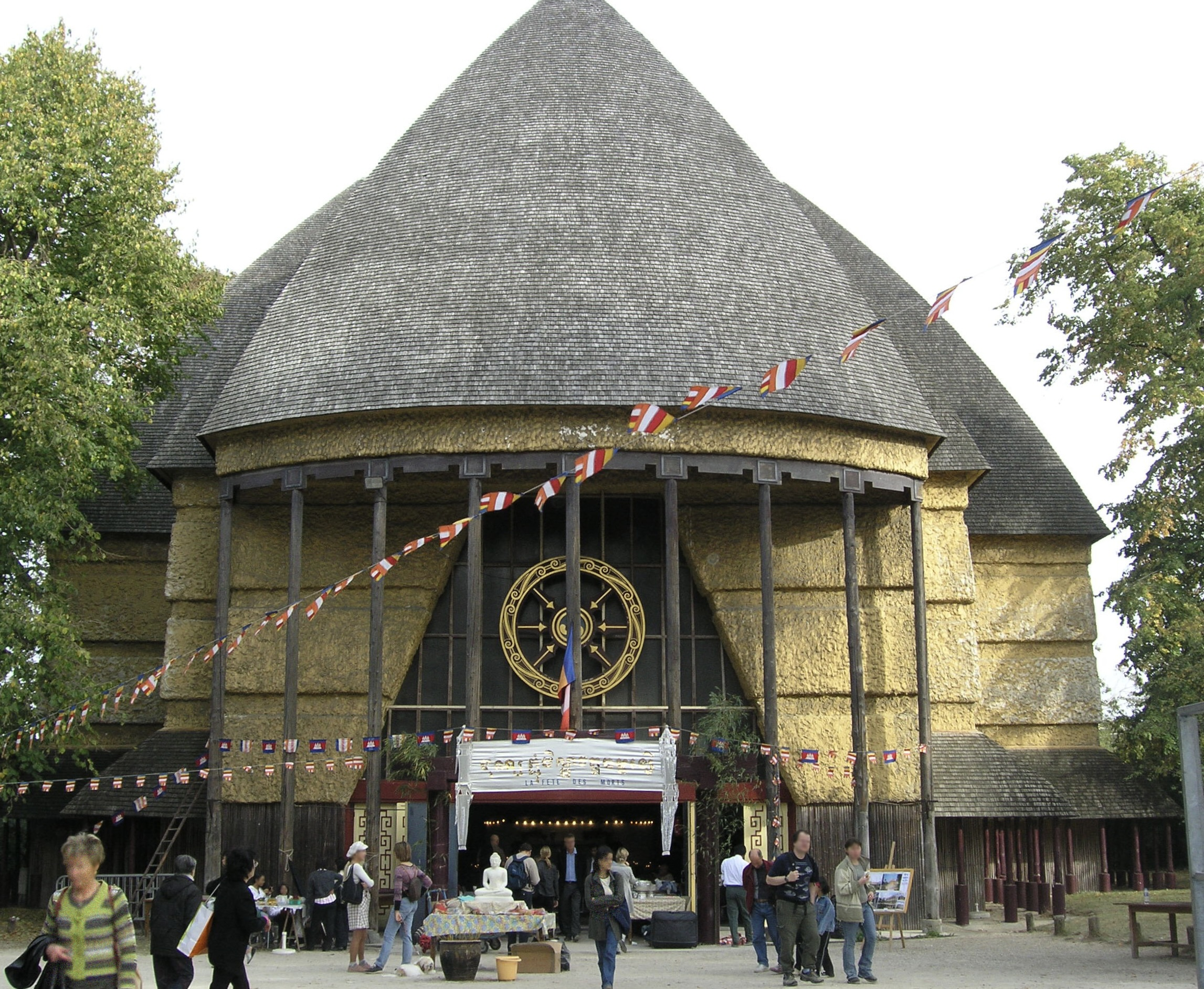
Pavillon du Togo by Louis-Hippolyte Boileau in bois de Vincennes

- The Pagode de Vincennes, on the edges of the lake Daumesnil, in the former houses of Cameroon and Togo of Louis-Hippolyte Boileau: Photo
- The church Notre-Dame des Missions was moved to Épinay-sur-Seine (95) in 1932.
- The reproduction of Mount Vernon, house of George Washington, moved to Vaucresson where it is still visible.
- The Scenic Railway was moved to Great Yarmouth Pleasure Beach, where it still operates.

== See also ==
- French colonial empire
- Colonialism
- Human zoo

== Notes ==
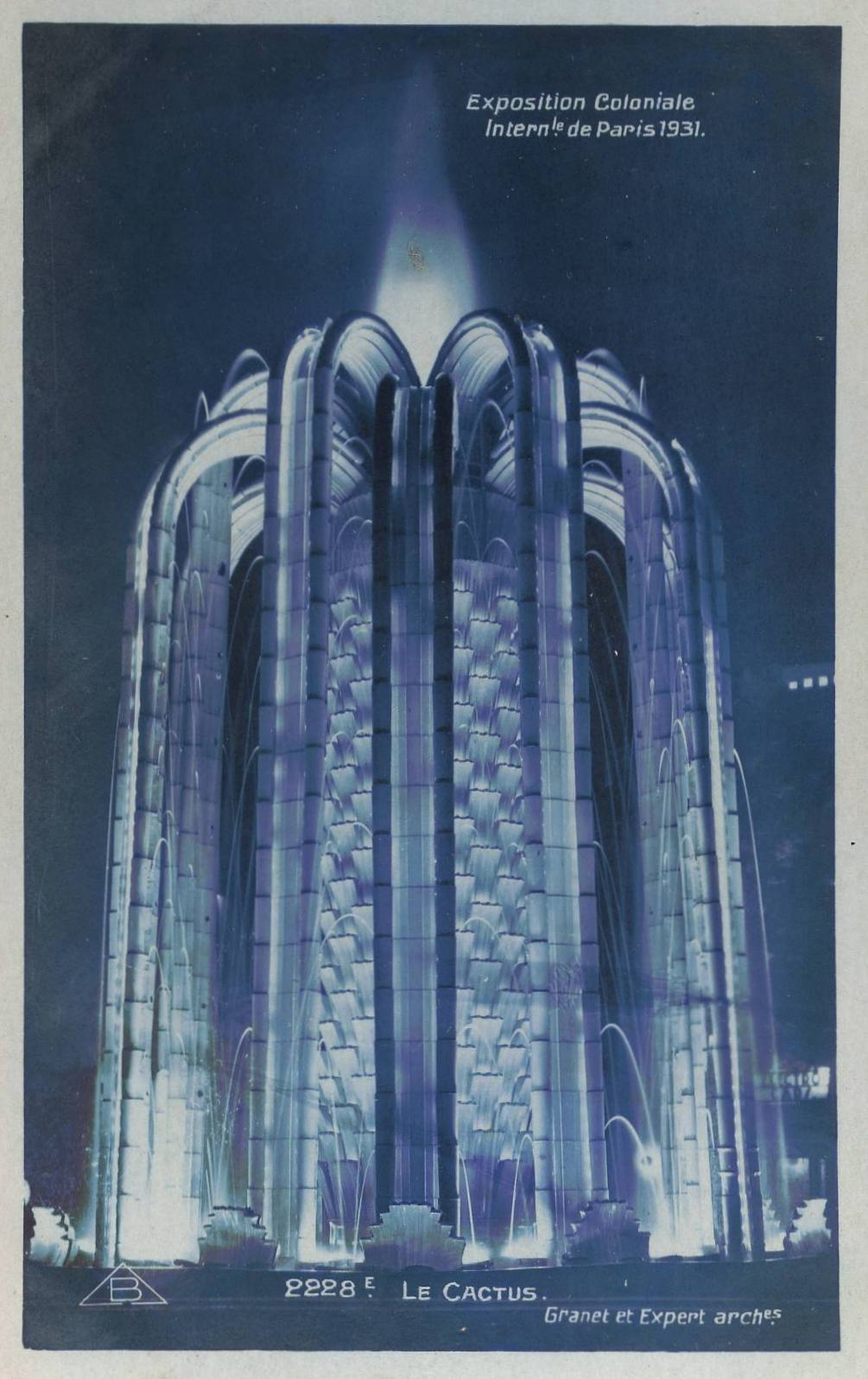
"Le Cactus", architects André Granet and Roger-Henri Expert
