= British Bandsman =

- Website Editor: Rob Tompkins
- Categories: British brass band music
- Frequency: Online
- Publisher: British Bandsman
- First issue: September 1887
- Final issue: June 2022
- Country: United Kingdom
- Based in: Oxfordshire
- Language: English
- Website: www.britishbandsman.com

British Bandsman was a magazine published weekly devoted to British brass band music. It was founded in 1887 by Sam Cope (1856–1948) and acquired by The Salvation Army in 2004, before being sold in April 2015 to KGC Media Ltd., a company formed by the publication's then managing editor. In August 2014, it was confirmed by Guinness World Records as the world's oldest weekly music magazine.

British Bandsman first appeared in September 1887 as The British Bandsman: A monthly magazine for Bandmasters and members of Military and Brass Bands. The magazine was printed monthly until circulation increased to weekly in 1902 after John Henry Iles purchased the publishing company Richard Smith & Co.

Production ceased for two weeks during the 1926 United Kingdom general strike in May 1926, and other than four editions that never appeared during Christmas closures in the 1970s, plus a period from September 1975 to September 1976 when it was published fortnightly, the magazine appeared weekly until 1 October 2016, when it was announced that it was to become a monthly publication. In September 2018, British Bandsman was bought by IBB Media Ltd and it was announced that it was to become an online publication, in addition to returning to being weekly.

On June 9, 2022, the last issue of The British Bandsman Magazine was published, the British Bandsman name will continue as online only, Rob Tompkins purchased the Domain name, Twitter, Facebook and Instagram accounts from IBB Media and will continue bringing banding news.

The ownership of the magazine title and the archive of The British Bandsman issues has now been sold to Rob Tompkins (May 2024), this also includes a number of items from the photographic archive.

== Editors ==
Name	Years in office
James Waterson (1)	1887–1888
Sam Cope (2)	1888–1895
James Browne (3)	1895–1898
Sam Cope	1899–1906
Herbert Whiteley (4)	1906–1930
Sam Cope	1930–1942
John Henry Iles (5)	1942–1951
Eric Ball (6)	1951–1963
Alfred Mackler (7)	1963–1964
Eric Ball	1964–1967
Geoffrey Brand (8)	1967–1975
Robert D. Alexander (9)	1975–1977
Peter Wilson (10)	1977–2000
Nicola Bland (11)	2000–2004
Kenneth Crookston (12)	2004–2018
Andrew Wainwright (13)	2018–2019
Mark Good (14)	2019– 2022
