= Dreamland Margate =

Amusement park in Kent, England

Dreamland
- Previously known as Bembom Brothers White Knuckle Theme Park

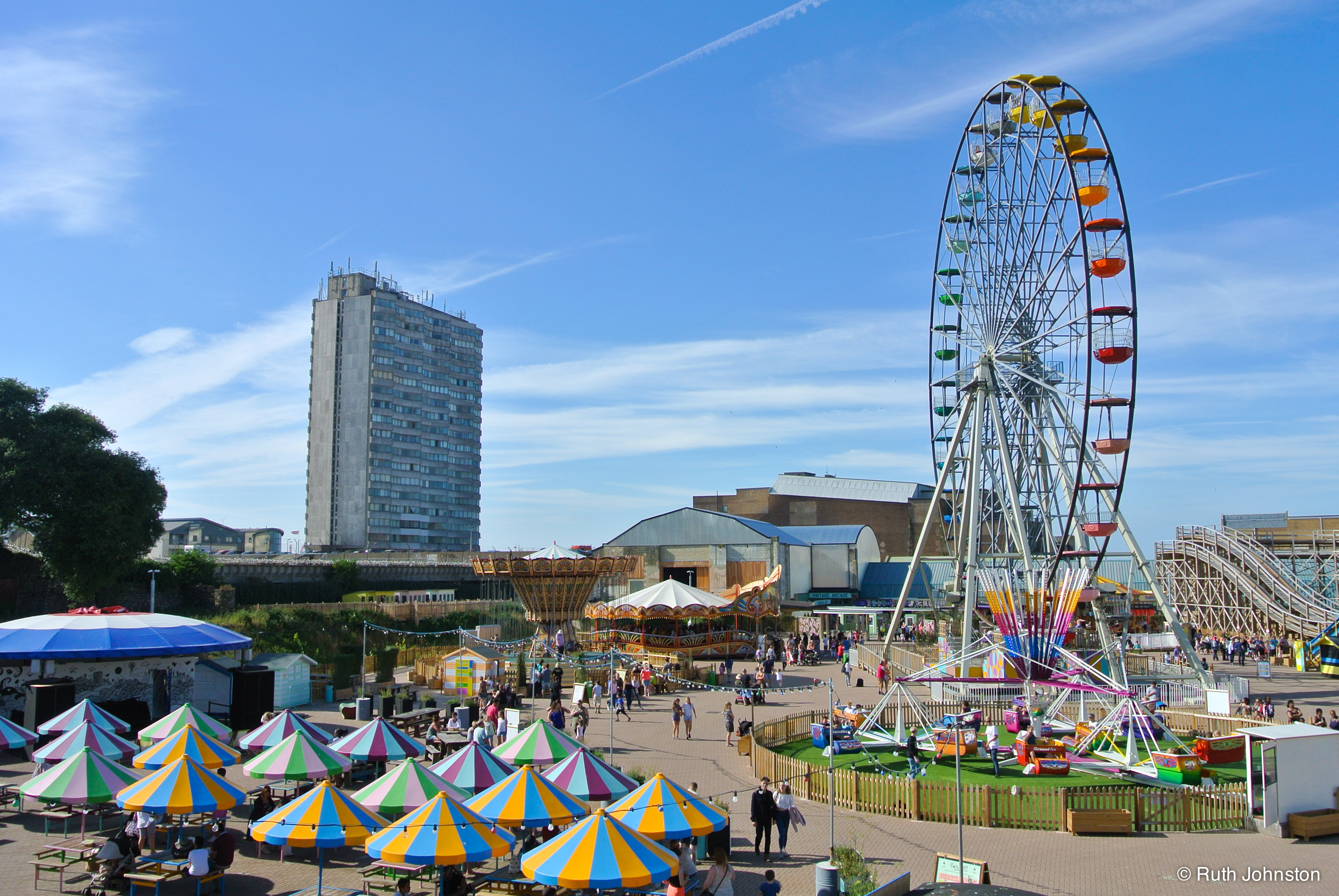
- Dreamland in 2016
- Interactive map of Dreamland
- Location: Margate, Kent
- Coordinates: 51°23′11″N 1°22′33″E
- Status: Operating
- Opened: 1880
- Owner: Sands Heritage Ltd.
- General manager: Eddie Kemsley
- Website: www.dreamland.co.uk

Dreamland Margate is an amusement park and entertainment centre based on a traditional English seaside funfair located in Margate, Kent, England. The site of the park was first used for amusement rides in 1880, although the Dreamland name was not used until 1920 when the park's Grade II* listed Scenic Railway wooden rollercoaster was opened.

The number of amusements at the park increased during the 1960s and 1970s, and in 1981 the site was sold to the Dutch Bembom brothers, who renamed it "Bembom Brothers White Knuckle Theme Park". The name remained until it reverted to Dreamland in 1990.

In the early 2000s, the park began to enter into decline, and a number of rides were sold to other theme parks. The park's owner, Jimmy Godden announced in 2003 that Dreamland would be closed and the site redeveloped, although the listing of the Scenic Railway meant it could not be moved. The site was sold to Margate Town Centre Regeneration Company in 2005, and this company proposed a residential redevelopment. A number of local residents then launched a campaign to restore and reopen Dreamland instead, although final closure was later in the same year. The site then fell into a state of disrepair as objections were raised to redevelopment plans, and was subject to a series of arson attacks including one which significantly damaged the Scenic Railway.

The public campaign to restore the park continued, and in September 2013, ownership passed to Thanet District Council after a compulsory purchase order was approved by a High Court judge. In 2014 it was confirmed that the park would be redeveloped. It re-opened in June 2015 as a "Re-imagined Dreamland". The operating company became insolvent in December 2015, but continued to operate under administration. A second refurbishment and relaunch took place in 2017, funded by the major creditor.

== History ==
=== Origins ===
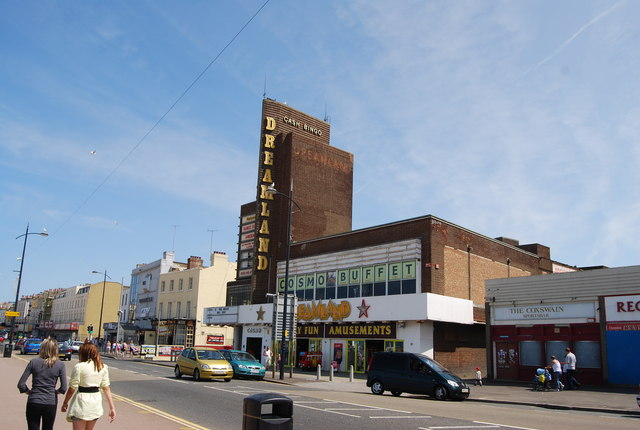
The Dreamland sign at the entrance to the park in 2009

The Dreamland site was a salt marsh known as the Mere that was inundated at high tide until 1809 when a causeway and seawall were built. In 1846 a railway terminus was built on the present Arlington site for the South Eastern Railway, followed in 1864 by a further terminus, for the rival London, Chatham and Dover Railway (LCDR) on the site of what is now Dreamland Cinema. The LCDR (under its subsidiary the Kent Coast Railway) completed this terminus in 1866, but no public service was ever offered. The junction faced Ramsgate, so a local Margate-Broadstairs-Ramsgate train service was envisaged.

Dreamland's remote origins as an entertainment venue date from the same year, when London restaurateurs Spiers and Pond opened a restaurant and dance hall in the unused railway terminus on the Mere causeway. Not being very successful, this 'Hall by the Sea' was bought by the Reeve family of Margate in 1870 for £3,750, who also gradually acquired the low-lying land at the rear of the Hall.

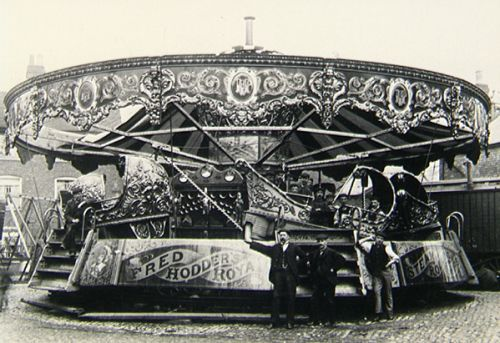
Frederick Savage's 'Sea-On-Land' carousel, where riders pitched up and down as if they were on the sea, was the first amusement ride installed in Margate in 1880.

In 1870, circus entrepreneur George Sanger went into partnership to run the 'Hall by the Sea' with Thomas Dalby Reeve, the then Mayor of Margate. After Reeve's death in 1875, Sanger became the sole proprietor of the Hall and the land behind it. This land behind the Hall, the former 'Mere', was turned into pleasure gardens with a mock ruined abbey, lake, statues and a menagerie – as well as sideshows and roundabouts. Animal cages and Gothic walls on the present Dreamland western and southern boundaries (now listed Grade II) date from this time. The main purpose of the menagerie was to act as a breeding and training centre for animals used in Sanger's travelling circus.

The first amusement rides were installed as early as 1880 when 'Sea on Land' machines were installed. Passengers sat in 'boats' that were made by a system of levers to pitch and roll as though at sea – a direct antecedent of the contemporary 'flight simulator' rides. In 1893 a large skating rink was built. Shortly after this, the park gained some notoriety as the venue for the murder of a sex-worker by the local circus strong man.

Scenic Railway 1930s

Sanger died in 1911 during a scuffle arising from the attempted murder of a friend (although Sanger himself may have been the intended target), and the park entered an uncertain period as part of the attraction was the charisma of the man himself. In the end, the site was purchased from his estate in 1919 for £40,000 by John Henry Iles, who had already set up theme parks all over the world, including at Cairo, Berlin, Petrograd (now St Petersburg) and Pittsburgh.

Inspired by Coney Island, which he had visited in 1906, Iles renamed the site 'Dreamland' and initiated work on the construction of the Scenic Railway rollercoaster in 1919, having purchased the European rights to the Scenic Railway design from inventor and patent holder LaMarcus Adna Thompson. The ride opened to the public in 1920 with great success, carrying half a million passengers in its first year. Iles also brought to the park other rides common to the time including a smaller roller coaster, the Joy Wheel, Miniature Railway, The Whip, and the River Caves.

=== Expansion ===
A ballroom was constructed on the site of the skating rink in 1920, and in 1923 Iles built his variety cinema on the site. (In 1926, he was also responsible for the building of Margate's lido on the seafront.) Between 1920 and 1935 he invested over £500,000 in the site, constantly adding new rides and facilities and culminating in the construction of the Dreamland cinema complex in 1934. Iles ceased to be a director in 1938 and the business was taken over by his son Eric.

Most of the Dreamland site was requisitioned by the Government during World War II, with the park reopening in June 1946. Eric Iles was manager. From 1947, it received investment from Butlins.

Three generations of the Iles family – John Henry, Eric, and John – controlled Dreamland from 1919 until its sale in 1968. The new owners, Associated Leisure, introduced many innovations to Dreamland, including squash courts and, in an echo of the Sanger era, an ice rink and zoo. Much of the planting of the pleasure gardens dating from the 1870s survived until the 1970s when the gardens were removed and the rides expanded. 1976 saw the debut of a revolutionary new ride, the 'Orbiter', unveiled by travelling showman and Dreamland lessee Henry Smith, a ride which went on to become highly successful in other amusement parks and travelling fairs around the world. Smith, himself a descendant of George Sanger, also had a Skid, Waltzer, Speedway, Tip Top, and another Orbiter up until the park's change of ownership in 1981. 1980 saw the opening of a 240-seater 148 ft high Big wheel.

Dreamland was purchased by the Dutch Bembom Brothers in 1981. They owned several other amusement parks in continental Europe and renamed the site Bembom Brothers White Knuckle Theme Park, bringing in a new headline attraction in the form of the Anton Schwarzkopf-designed 'Looping Star' roller coaster. The name change lasted until 1990, when it reverted to Dreamland. Other changes they made included ceasing evening hours and charging for admission, rather than per ride. They also introduced many new 'high-tech' rides that updated the park and made it, by the late 1980s, one of the top ten most visited tourist attractions in the United Kingdom.

=== Decline ===
In common with other traditional British seaside resorts, Margate's economic base depended on residential holidaymakers staying for several days, usually families holidaying for a week or more. This was supplemented by day-trippers on weekends and public holidays, when the resort could become very busy. With the rise of cheap package holidays abroad from the 1960s, however, the residential holiday trade progressively collapsed in the 1970s. This meant that footfall at entertainment venues in these resorts, such as Dreamland, declined sharply on summer weekdays while remaining relatively buoyant at weekends.

Day-tripper trade at Margate remained substantial, but the loss of holiday revenue meant that the town began to struggle to maintain its infrastructure. This, in turn, started to affect its attractiveness as a day destination. However, the investment by Bembom Brothers indicates that this was not regarded as an appreciable threat to Dreamland at the beginning of the 1980s.

More immediately serious was the opening of much larger amusement parks closer to London, on expansive sites and with ample vehicle parking. Thorpe Park opened in 1979, and Chessington World of Adventures in 1987. At this time, the fastest train journey from London to Margate was just under two hours, and Dreamland has never had any public on-site parking.

The Wild Mouse roller coaster, July 1999

In 1996 the Bembom family sold the site to local entrepreneur Jimmy Godden, who had previously operated the Rotunda Amusement Park at Folkestone and Ramsgate Pleasure Park at Ramsgate. At this time, most of the rides they owned were relocated. The 'Looping Star (Great America)' went to an amusement park in Budapest together with the looping boat ride The Mary Rose. The Looping Star's sister ride made a brief appearance for two seasons at Margate (previously at Camelot Theme park) before leaving again for its current home, Loudon Castle theme park, where it is called the Twist 'n' Shout.

After his purchase of the park, Godden was able to secure European and regional grant aid to assist in an initial £3m redevelopment. However, during Godden's tenure many of the rides were sold off, including the big wheel which had dominated the Margate skyline for two decades but was dismantled and sold to a park in Mexico.

=== Closure ===
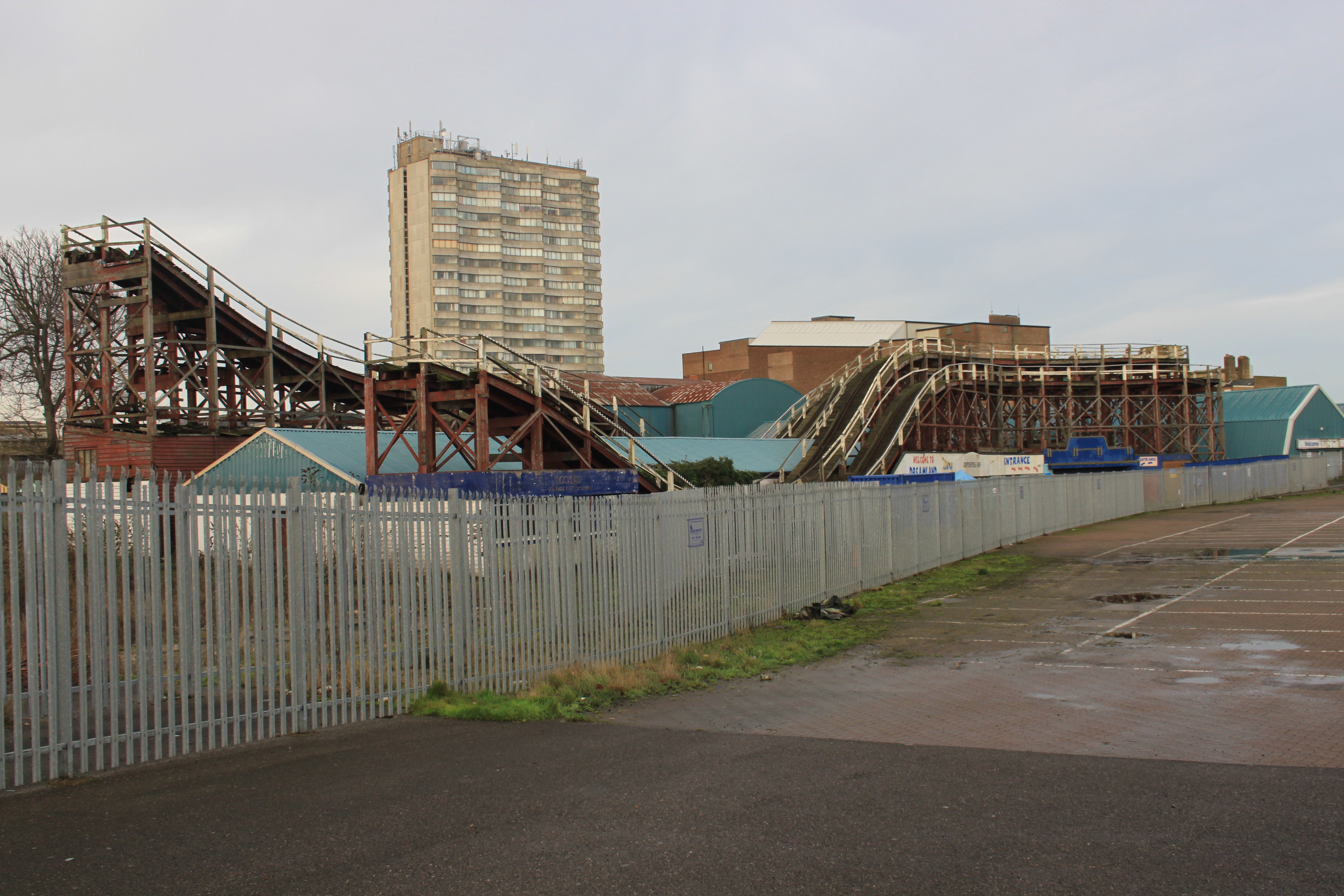
Part of the derelict Scenic Railway in 2013

In 2003, Godden announced that Dreamland would close down and the land would be redeveloped. A vocal section of public opinion supported continued use of the Dreamland site as an amusement park, along with a government report in 2004.

After the closure announcement, Dreamland was sold to Margate Town Centre Regeneration Company (MTCR) in 2005 for £20m. A number of local residents then formed the 'Save Dreamland Campaign'. The campaign proposed to turn Dreamland into a heritage amusement park, consisting of a number of vintage rides and attractions from other British amusement parks. Some rides were obtained by Save Dreamland and placed in storage.

Although it was initially announced that Dreamland would close in November 2003, it operated during 2004 and 2005. Definitive closure to the public was in 2005 and all of the rides apart from the Scenic Railway were then removed from the site. The Scenic Railway had been granted Grade-II listed status in 2002, and so could not be moved or dismantled.

Part of the Scenic Railway was damaged by fire after an arson attack on 7 April 2008. About 25% of the structure, boarding station, storage sheds, and trains were destroyed and had to be removed as irreparable. The physical security of the site was upgraded, and the surviving structure surveyed. Some of the surviving machinery and chassis from the cars were salvaged and stored on site. Another suspected arson attack was carried out on the site on 28 May 2014, but this was confined to a disused building near the Scenic Railway.

On 25 April 2008 the Dreamland cinema's Listed building status increased from Grade II (buildings of special architectural or historic interest) to Grade II* (particularly significant buildings of more than local interest). The cinema, which featured a Compton theatre organ, was closed in 2007 following the opening of a new multiplex cinema at Westwood Cross. The buildings were placed under renovation and the Dreamland sign on the front tower has been refurbished with LED lighting and shines brightly at night.

The defunct cinema was sold by MTCR, by then renamed DreamlandLive Ltd. This was before the result of a court appeal by this company to stop Thanet District Council taking possession of the theme park under a compulsory purchase order, served in June 2011. The CPO was approved in August 2012.

=== Re-opening project ===
The success of the Save Dreamland Campaign in attracting public awareness led to the establishment of the Dreamland Trust, a registered charity, in 2007 to co-ordinate a re-opening project.

A total of £18m in public funding was subsequently awarded to the project, to restore, preserve and maintain the listed structures, which included the Scenic Railway, menagerie cages and some of the internal building spaces. This money was also used to purchase five heritage rides.

On 16 November 2009, the Dreamland Trust was awarded a grant of £3m by the Heritage Lottery Fund with further funding of £3.7m and £4m coming from the UK Department for Culture, Media and Sport and Thanet District Council respectively, to restore the Scenic Railway and to develop the former Dreamland site as necessary for rejuvenation.

The Scenic Railway was regarded as being the focus of the rejuvenation of Dreamland as a heritage amusement park. Work began in September 2014, with a complete refurbishment of the track and new trains being built.

Some historic rides from other parks were donated to the Dreamland Trust and put in storage for restoration at a later date. The majority of unique old rides at Pleasureland Southport were donated, which included the 1940s Caterpillar ride, King Solomon's Mines wooden roller-coaster (formerly of Frontierland, Morecambe and later moved to Pleasureland Southport), workings from the Ghost Train and River Caves, the Hall of Mirrors, Mistral, Haunted swing and the Skyride (Chairlift ride). The Junior Whip which stood at Blackpool Pleasure Beach was also donated.

Wayne Hemingway, his wife Gerardine, and the 'HemingwayDesign' team were appointed as designers of the envisaged new Dreamland in 2012. This included the creative vision for re-imagination and branding.

An additional £10m in private funding was invested in the re-opening of Dreamland by the commercial operators chosen to run it, Sands Heritage Ltd. These funds were used to introduce a collection of 17 additional rides to create the amusement park, as well as a Roller Disco & Diner, Amusement Arcade, Vintage Pin Ball Arcade, Dreamland Emporium and The Octopus's Garden. The running agreement between Sands Heritage and Thanet District Council involved the former taking out a 99-year lease of the freehold property owned by the council as a result of the CPO, while the council remained responsible for certain aspects of repair and maintenance including as regards the Scenic Railway. Part of the capital raised by Sands Heritage was a £600 000 short-term secured loan from Arrowgrass Master Fund, an investment company based in the Cayman Islands. This company also held 31% of the share capital of Sands Heritage.

=== Opening of Re-imagined Dreamland ===
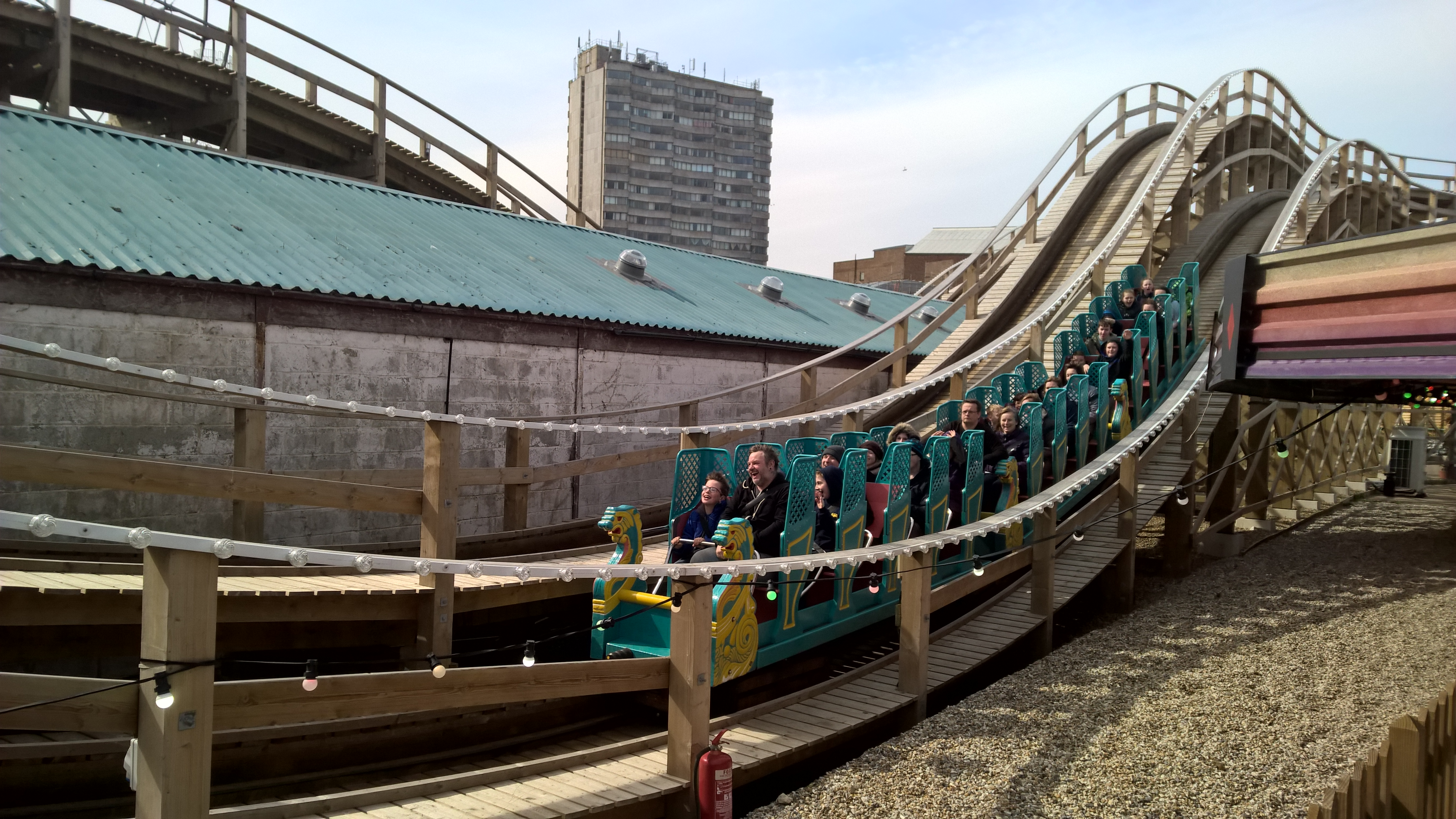
The restored Scenic Railway in 2016

The park re-opened on 19 June 2015, garnering much media coverage. BBC Radio Kent spent the opening day broadcasting live from Dreamland. There was a slight delay to the opening ceremony, and BBC Kent broadcasters Jo Burn and Zac Daunt-Jones spent 45 minutes entertaining the crowds, while live on-the-air. Additional rides opened in July.

The entry fee to the park was £14.95.

The park's centrepiece, the Scenic Railway, was still in the process of being rebuilt by Thanet District Council. It opened to the public only on 17 October 2015, owing to delays in rebuilding the train carriages. Member and press previews took place on 16 October 2015. Sands Heritage put in a claim for lost revenue as a result of the delay, which was settled in November with a compensation payment by TDC to Sands Heritage after the delay to opening the Scenic Railway forced the company into administration.

=== Administration ===
On 8 December 2015, Sands Heritage were forced to apply to the High Court for a company voluntary arrangement (CVA) in relation to a debt of £2.9m owed to Arrowgrass. This amounted to the original £600 000 owed as a secured loan, plus unpaid compound interest and charges. At a meeting on 23 December 2015 the company's creditors agreed to accept the CVA, allowing the company more time to pay off its existing debts. Sands Heritage representatives at the meeting promised that the debt to Arrowgrass would be repaid over five years - as a secured debt, this took priority over other debts. The insolvency administrators appointed in the CVA were Duff & Phelps.

The financial failure was attributed primarily to the number of visitors in the summer season of 2015 being half of what was predicted for the capital structuring of the project. Media reports estimated the cash loss suffered by the company as being on the order of £5 million. The major contributing factor for visitor shortfall was the delay of the Scenic Railway project and lack of communication from the management team of Thanet District Council to Sands Heritage, leading to a premature opening when preparatory works were incomplete. This led to an almost immediate closure of seventeen days to complete these, and the Scenic Railway was to take longer. Also, there were problems with running repairs to rides, leading to breakdowns. Despite popular belief, the admission price cited as discouraging visitors was not the reason for Sand Heritage's cash flow problems; however, the management team and the administrators, Duff & Phelps, abolished it to drive footfall when it became apparent the Scenic Railway would not work for a second summer season.

In August 2016, the CEO of Dreamland, Eddie Kemsley, resigned. A creditors' meeting held in August 2016 revealed that creditors were owed £8.34m, with Sands Heritage having an overall balance sheet shortfall of £14m (£10m of which reflected the investment made by Sands Heritage themselves). An auditors' report to Thanet District Council in December that year revealed that several of these creditors were small local businesses with little hope of any repayment.

The administrators initially expressed their hope that Dreamland as a business could be sold as a going concern in March 2017, after the 2016 summer season. However, this was rendered improbable by their half-yearly report to creditors (December 2015 to June 2016) when they revealed that operating losses during the period were over £1m or about £41 000 per week. They warned that losses were continuing, factors cited being bad weather in early summer and the failure of the Scenic Railway in mid-June.

The Scenic Railway had been restored by Thanet District Council following the arson attack. Unfortunately the right knowledge and expertise had not been available when it was rebuilt, and so it failed a safety test in June 2017. The ride is powered by cable haulage, nowadays a rare form of traction worldwide, and the wrong sort of cables was specified. When TDC tried to rectify the matter after the failure, it found that the skills concerned were so specialist that they were rare worldwide and sourcing them was only successful after the summer season was over. The administrators indicated their intention to seek compensation for the failure.

=== Second relaunch ===
Arrowgrass covered the operating losses for the summer season of 2016 with a further loan of £1m, secured on the premises of 49–51 Marine Terrace. This was a former pub owned freehold by Sands Leisure (not part of the TDC lease), which had been called the Cinque Ports Arms before the later 20th century. An extension of the administration period was sought, and granted.

Then it was announced that the investment company had increased its lending to just under £10m, to allow for a re-vamp of the business. In February 2017 it was reported that a £25m private investment from Arrowgrass had been obtained.

The new loan was used to re-landscape the site and to add some new rides, with refurbishment of the Cinque Ports pub. The premises had been used as the ticket office for Dreamland and the administrative centre of Sands Leisure, but a bar was opened in it by the administrators in the 2016 season and it was due to be restored to a complete pub for the 2017 re-launch.

The improved park was announced as reopening on 28 April 2017; however this was later delayed to 26 May. The event attracted national media attention. The major new feature which was mentioned as adding to the viability of the business was a new music venue with a capacity of 15 000.

Private investigation by a Thanet District councillor revealed that all the fixed assets of Sands Leisure had loans secured on them for repayment to Arrowgrass. These included the fairground rides owned by the company, as well as the 99-year lease from TDC and other properties owned freehold by the company. If the figure of indebtedness of £25m quoted by the national media was correct, in May 2017 Arrowgrass had almost complete control of the value of the assets of Dreamland. According to the terms of the security given for the loans, if repayment conditions were breached then Arrowgrass could apply for Sands Leisure to be liquidated and could then claim the equity of the lease of the property in lieu.

In 2017, the park hosted 15,000 people at the Demon Dayz festival with Gorillaz. In October 2017 the park exited administration.

There has been interest in redeveloping the Arlington House tower block, next door to Dreamland, which is owned by Thanet Council. In 2018, it was reported that any future deal for the redevelopment of Dreamland could include the Arlington House site.

In 2019 the park reported experiencing its most successful year since reopening, with more than 700,000 visitors across the year, and announced a new programme of events for its 100th anniversary in 2020. In August 2019, the park unveiled a seven metre inflatable sculpture of Tina Turner's head, created by Cool Shit, in celebration of the 2019 Turner Prize exhibition being hosted in Margate.

On 1 August 2019, Thanet District Council agreed the sale of the Dreamland site, including the amusement park and the adjacent car park and cinema, to a new operator Sands Heritage Limited, for £7 million. The sale was completed the following year. In December 2023, the full ownership of Sands Heritage was taken over by LN-Gaiety Holdings, a subsidiary of Live Nation Entertainment.

On 27 January 2026, Dreamland announced the permanent closure of the Scenic Railway. The ride had been closed since August 2024 following a derailing incident.

== Rides and attractions ==
Name	Manufacturer	Type	Year opened
Scenic Railway	J.H. Iles (Rebuilt by WGH Ltd and Topbond Plc)	Wooden Roller Coaster	1920 (Rebuilt in 2015)
Austin Cars	Hayes Fabrications. Refurbished by Littleboy's Vintage Restorations	Car Ride	2015
Beehive Coaster	D.P.V. Rides "Brucomela" Roller Coaster. Relocated from Luna Park Sunny Beach, Bulgaria. Previously operated as "Counter Culture Caterpillar" before being re-themed by Ben Irwin.	Children's Roller Coaster	2015
The Big Wheel	Technical Park refurbished by Amusement Technical, relocated from Sofia Land, Bulgaria	Ferris Wheel	2015
Born Slippy	Harry Steer Engineering (1989), refurbished by Amusement Technical, relocated from Paulton's Park.	Astroglide (Slide)	2015
Chair-O-Plane	Fritz Bothmann (Pre-1935). Previously owned by Alan Cauldwell. Refurbished by Littleboy's Vintage Restorations	Chair Swing	2016
Cyclone Twist	Edwin Hall (Pre-1962). Manufactured under license from Eli Bridge Company. Previously owned by Albert Holland.	Twist (ride)	2017
Dodgems	Structure - Lang Wheels (1946). Cars - S.D.C. Previously owned by Perron Coupland. Refurbished by Littleboy's Vintage Restorations	Dodgems	2015
The Double Decker	Orton & Spooner. Refurbished by Littleboy's Vintage Restorations	Carousel	2015
Dreamland Drop	Zamperla	Zamperla Sky Tower (43m)	2018
The Gallopers	Savage (1923), initially delivered to Harry Gray. Previously operated at the park from 1997-2005. Located at the Hop Farm, Paddock Wood, Kent (2008-2012), before being refurbished by Littleboy's Vintage Restorations and redelivered to the park.	Carousel	2015
Hurricane Jets	Lang Wheels (1958). Previously owned by Carters Steam Fair.Refurbished by Littleboy's Vintage Restorations	Zodiac Jets	2015
Mary Rose		Children's Play Area	2015
Mirror Maze	Dreamland	Mirror Maze	2015
Motorcycle Speedway	Orton & Spooner Ark Number 55 (1937). Previously owned by Tom Smith.Refurbished by Littleboy's Vintage Restorations	Speedway Ark	2015
Roller Room	A 1970s roller disco-style skating rink, open on a seasonal basis (spring to summer).	Roller rink	At least 2016
Swing Boats		Swing Boats	2015
Waltzer	R.J. Lakin (1947), relocated from Great Yarmouth Pleasure Beach. Previously owned by John Armitage.	Waltzer	2016
Wedgewood Teacups	Amusement Technical	Midi-Teacups	2017

== Festivals ==
On 6 March 2017 Gorillaz announced the Demon Dayz festival to be held at Dreamland on 10 June 2017. Tickets sold out in 32 minutes, at about 15,000 tickets in an hour.

On 14 September 2018 the National Citizen Service hosted their graduation ceremony at Dreamland, at which 700 Kent and Sussex teens graduated from the employability programme. Each received a signed certificate from the Prime Minister.

== In popular culture ==
Dreamland was the subject of a 1953 documentary film, O Dreamland. It was also visited by characters in the 1989 Christmas special of the BBC Television sitcom Only Fools and Horses titled "The Jolly Boys' Outing". Some of the rides seen in the sitcom were renamed and repainted at Loudoun Castle Theme Park in Scotland (now closed). The Mary Rose was renamed the Black Pearl and is now at Lightwater Valley in North Yorkshire. In an episode of British sitcom One Foot in the Grave titled "Dreamland", during a conversation with Victor, Margaret recalls the couple visiting Margate and Dreamland on their third anniversary.

The park was also the filming location for the 2007 film Exodus and featured prominently in the 2000 film Last Resort, about a young Russian immigrant seeking asylum in England.

Dreamland is frequently alluded to in Graham Swift's 1996 novel Last Orders, as well as the 2001 film adaptation.

English band The Equals filmed scenes from their 1969 music video for "Michael and the Slipper Tree" at Dreamland.

The Romford-based band Five Star shot the majority of the video for their 1984 single "Crazy" at Dreamland.

On 29 June 2015, the music video for the song 'Blue' by Marina and the Diamonds was shot at Dreamland.

On 26 September 2017, the Sky Mobile iPhone 8 commercial with actor Tom Hardy was shot at Dreamland.

In February 2022, the Dreamland Cinema signage was changed while the building was used as a set in Sam Mendes' 1980s period film Empire of Light.
