= Brakeman =

Rail transport worker

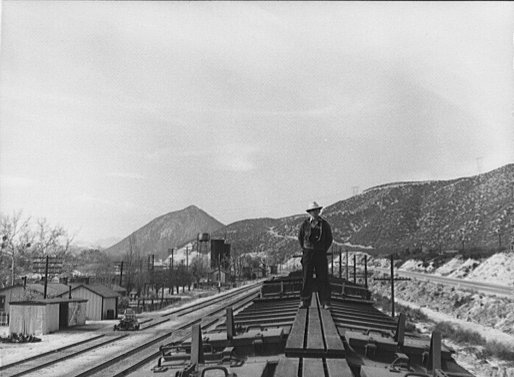
- A Santa Fe Railroad brakeman atop a train that has paused at Cajon, California, to cool its brakes after descending Cajon Pass in March 1943.

Occupation
- Activity sectors: rail transport

Description
- Related jobs: conductor

A brakeman is a rail transport worker whose original job was to assist the braking of a train by applying brakes on individual wagons. The advent of through brakes, brakes on every wagon which the driver could control, made this role redundant, although the name lives on, for example, in the United States where brakemen carry out a variety of functions both on the track and within trains.

== By country ==
=== Germany ===
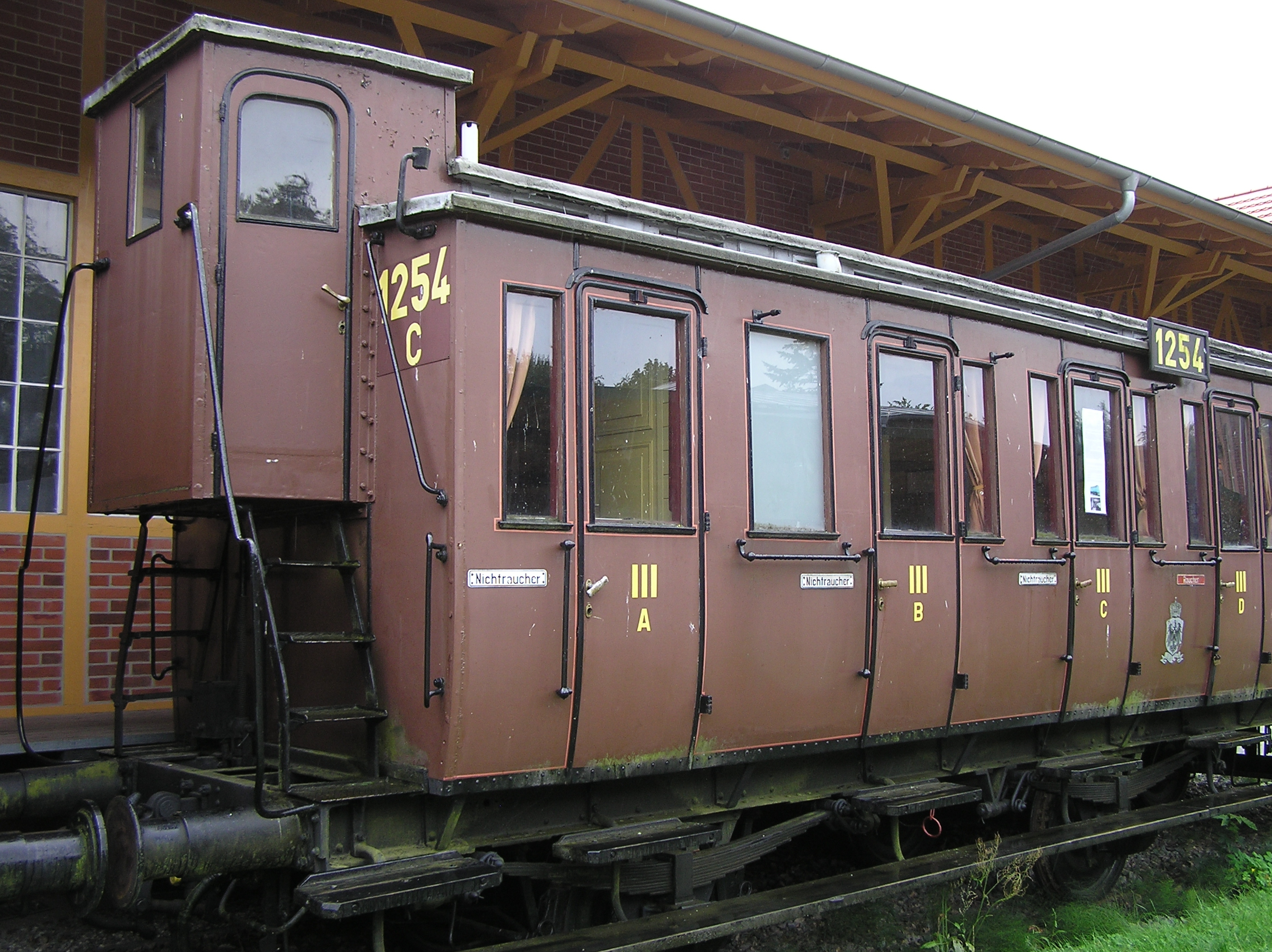
Brakeman's cab (left) on a Prussian compartment coach

In Germany, the brakemen occupied brakeman's cabins on several or even all wagons in a train and would operate the wagon brakes when signaled by the engine driver.

The implementation of air brakes led to the phasing out of brakemen who previously operated manual brakes from brakemen's cabins. While the construction of brakemen's cabins ceased around 1925, existing wagons with such cabins remained in use for several decades. In Germany, these wagons were commonly seen up to the mid-1970s.

=== United Kingdom ===
In the UK, "brakeman" was an alternative term for the position more often referred to as the guard, originally tasked with stopping the train from the brake van if a coupler broke. As rail lines extended, the guard would apply brakes on downhill gradients. With longer trains, the job included notifying the driver (by waving a lamp) that the rear of the train had either started moving with the rest of the train or had stopped with it. As trains were sometimes required to run in reverse, the guard was also tasked with ensuring that the tail lamp shone white rather than red.

In 1968, with the prevalence of diesel and electric trains, in which the guard could ride in the rear cab of the locomotive, and the rising prevalence of fully braked trains that did not require a separate braking vehicle, the legal requirement for brake vans was eliminated.

=== United States ===
During the early days of railroading, one of the most deadly jobs in America was that of brakeman, who worked from the top of moving trains in all weather

In the United States, the brakeman was a member of a railroad train's crew responsible for assisting with braking a train when the engineer wanted the train to slow down or stop. A brakeman's duties also included providing flag protection from following trains if the train were to stop, ensuring that the couplings between cars were properly set, lining switches, and signaling to the train operators while performing switching operations. The brakemen rode in the caboose, the last car in the train, which was built specially to allow a crew member to apply the brakes of the caboose quickly and easily, which would help to slow the train. In rare cases, such as descending a long, steep grade, brakemen might be assigned to several cars and be required to operate the brakes from atop the train while the train was moving. By the start of the 20th century, some local U.S. labor laws noted that enough brakemen would be staffed on every train such that a brakeman would be responsible for no more than two cars. Brakemen were also required to watch the train when it was underway to look for signs of hot boxes (a dangerous overheating of axle bearings) or other damage to rolling stock, as well as for people trying to ride the train for free and cargo shifting or falling off.

A brakeman's job was historically very dangerous, with numerous reports of brakemen falling from trains, colliding with lineside structures, or being run over or crushed by rolling stock. As rail transport technology has improved, a brakeman's duties have been reduced and altered to match the updated technology. The brakeman's job has become much safer than it was in the early days of railroading. Individually operated car brakes were replaced by remotely-operated air brakes, eliminating the need for the brakeman to walk atop a moving train to set the brakes. Link and pin couplings were replaced with automatic couplings, and hand signals are now supplemented by two-way radio communication.

After the advent of automatic brakes meant the primary role of the brakeman was no longer to control the train with hand brakes, the role became effectively that of the conductor's assistant. Brakemen gave hand signals to the engine crew and operated the couplers when coupling and uncoupling cars, assisted the conductor with loading and unloading cargo, and stood behind the train with a flag or lantern if it had to stop where there was a danger of another train hitting it. On passenger trains, brakemen were in charge of lighting and heating, opening the doors, and assisting the conductor in collecting tickets and fares.

Today, the brakeman job is also commonly known as the assistant conductor, helper, or the 3rd man. They assist the conductor in their duties. On some railroads, the brakeman drives a company pickup truck, allowing them to drive ahead of the train to line switches, or scout industries and how the cars are located.

As of 2012, 24,380 "railroad brake, signal, and switch operators" jobs were held in the U.S., 93% in the rail transport industry, with the remainder employed by supporting companies. By 2018, the total number had dropped to 14,270, with the highest employment rates in Texas, Illinois, Georgia, Missouri, and New York.

== Duties today ==
In North America, freight and yard crews consisting of conductor, engineer, and brakeman usually employ the brakeman in throwing hand-operated track switches to line up for switching moves and assisting in cuts and hitches as cars are dropped off and picked up. A brakeman is sometimes seen as an assistant to the conductor in a train's operations.

In North American passenger service, the brakeman (called trainman or assistant conductor) collects revenue, may operate door "through switches" for specific platforming needs, makes announcements, and operates train-line door open-and-close controls when required to assist the conductor. A passenger service trainman is often required to qualify as a conductor after 1 to 2 years of experience. The rear-end trainman signals to the conductor when all the train's doors are safely closed, then boards and closes their door.

=== Scenic railways ===
Scenic railways, particularly in the form of side friction roller coasters, require a brakeman to ride with the train around the track to slow it down at certain points on the layout, particularly bends; as the trains are not mechanically held onto the track. The brakeman is responsible for slowing the train down when necessary and stopping it in the station at the end of the ride. There are only a few examples of such rides now left in existence; the Scenic Railway at Luna Park, Melbourne, Australia, and the Roller Coaster at Great Yarmouth Pleasure Beach, UK, are two of the largest examples.

== See also ==
- Jimmie Rodgers, also known as the "Singing Brakeman"
- Jesús García, also known as the "Héroe de Nacozari" or "Hero of Nacozari"
