= Roller Coaster (Great Yarmouth Pleasure Beach) =

Amusement ride in Great Yarmouth, England

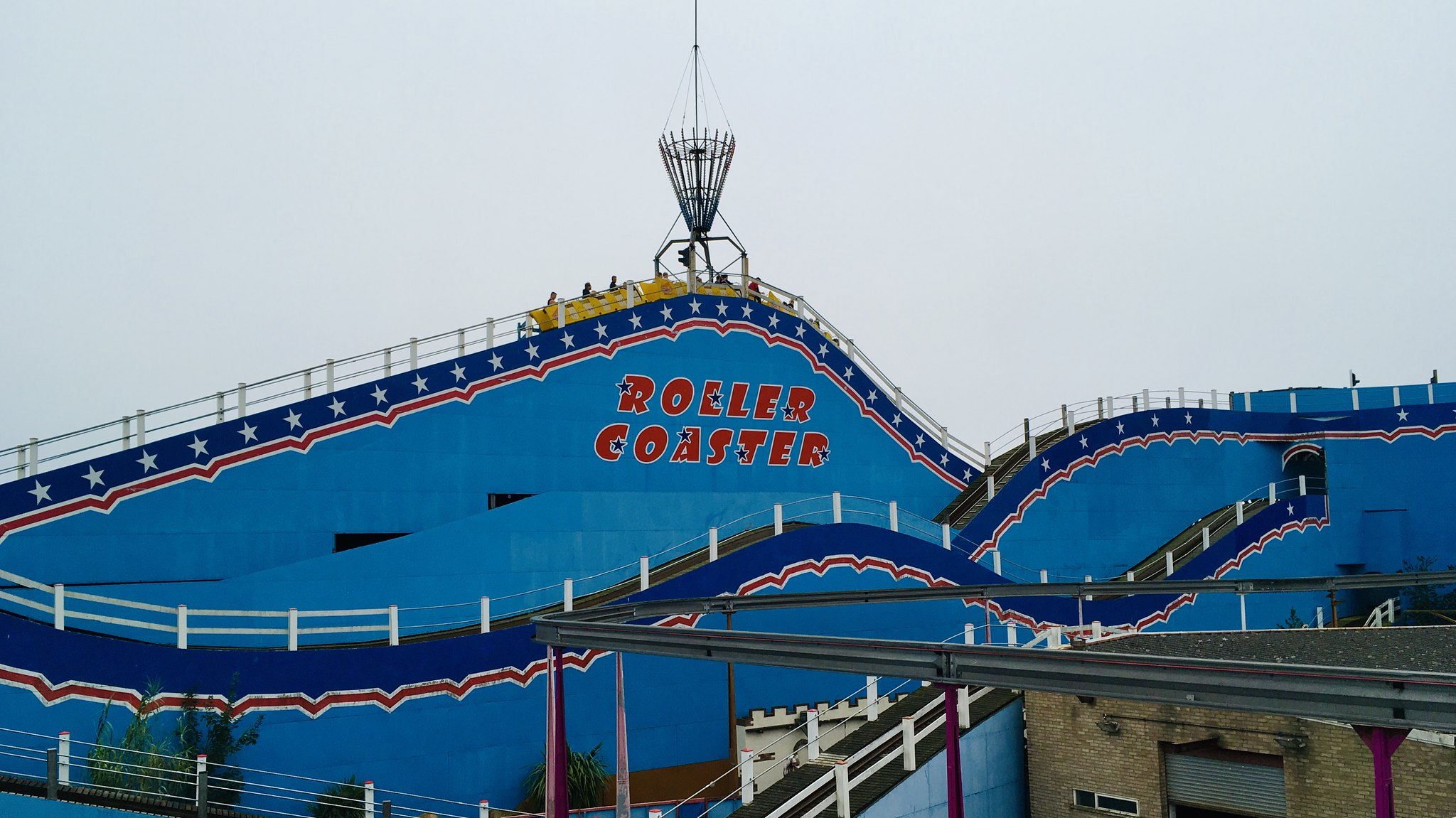
- Roller Coaster in August 2020

Great Yarmouth Pleasure Beach
- Location: Great Yarmouth Pleasure Beach
- Coordinates: 52.5928°N 1.7361°E
- Status: Operating
- Opening date: 14 May 1932

General statistics
- Type: Wood
- Designer: Erich Heidrich
- Track layout: Triple out and back
- Lift/launch system: Chain lift hill
- Height: 21 m (69 ft)
- Drop: 16 m (52 ft)
- Length: 982.40 m (3,223.1 ft)
- Speed: 72 km/h (45 mph)
- Inversions: 0
- Duration: 3:20
- Max vertical angle: 35°
- Capacity: 600 riders per hour
- Trains: 5 (3 in operation) trains with 3 cars; riders arranged 2 across in 5 rows for a total of 30 riders per train
- Roller Coaster at RCDB

Roller Coaster – also known as Scenic Railway or The Scenic – is a wooden roller coaster at Great Yarmouth Pleasure Beach, Great Yarmouth, UK. The ride was built at the park in 1932 and has been operational since. It is the only scenic railway still in operation in the UK and one of only seven in the world. In common with most scenic railways, an operator rides the car. Traditionally referred to as a 'brakesperson’, the operator applies brakes on the car to control its speed and to stop it at the end of the ride, as there are no brakes on the track. It is the second tallest and second fastest wooden roller coaster in the UK. It is also a Grade II listed building.

== History ==
In 1931, Pat Collins, then owner of Pleasure Beach, and his son John, who was managing the park, were on the lookout for a large attraction to install at the park. The Collins' visited the Colonial Exhibition in Paris where there was an amusement park among the attractions. The largest ride there was a scenic railway being operated by German showman Hugo Haase. At the close of the Exhibition, Collins purchased the ride for Pleasure Beach and it was dismantled, shipped to England and erected in the park. The ride opened on 14 May 1932.

== The ride ==
The ride's superstructure is entirely timber, predominantly fir and pine, and is clad in steel sheets. Like most scenic railways, it was originally clad in plaster and concrete sculpted to resemble mountainous terrain. It measures around 140 by 30 metres (459 by 98 feet), and the highest point of the track is 21 metres (69 feet). The track length is 982.40 metres (3,223.1 feet), which makes this ride the second longest scenic railway in the world. The track is wooden and the running rails are in a trough with walkways either side. The ride is often called a side-friction coaster, which is misleading as the train makes no contact with the side walls of the track and the running wheels are flanged like those of railway vehicles. The beginning of the ride features two large drops, the second of which is a 'headchopper' where the train dives under some of the support structure of the ride. There are also other drops and a bunnyhop sequence which gives very good air-time both at the front and back of the train. In total there are nine drops. A typical ride time is 3 minutes 20 seconds, but can vary depending on the styles of the particular brakesperson.

There are five trains, although only three are currently in operation. Each train is made up of three cars, each of which has five 2-person bench seats, allowing 30 riders per train. There are manual lap-bars and grab rails for each seat. The brakesperson rides between the first and second cars. The brakesperson moderates the speed of the train as necessary, depending on the conditions to ensure it arrives in the station at the end of the ride at a safe speed. Unlike modern roller coasters, there are no brakes on the track at all.

== Popularity ==
The ride is the most popular attraction at the Pleasure Beach; its popularity largely due to its uniqueness. The ride is an ACE Coaster Classic, along with the Scenic Railway at Luna Park, Melbourne, Australia, and the Rutschebanen at Tivoli Gardens in Copenhagen, Denmark; the only operational scenic railways to obtain this status. A copy of the ride was made by the Collins', which ended up at their amusement park in Barry Island, where it operated from 1940 until 1973.

Part of the music video for the 1982 single "House of Fun" by Madness was filmed at the Pleasure Beach with the band seen riding on the Roller Coaster.

== Gallery ==
Roller Coaster seen soon after construction was completed in May 1932

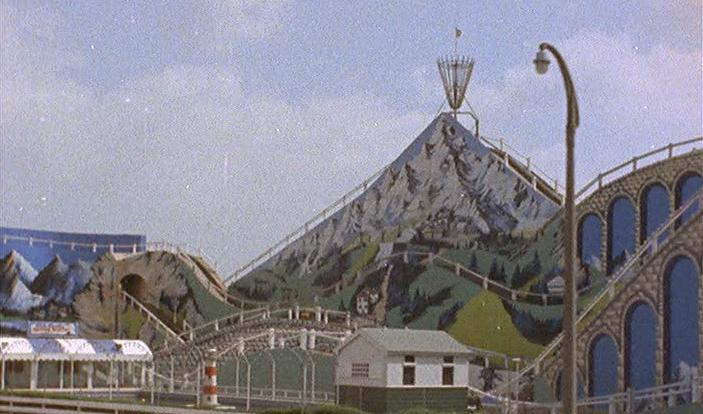
The painted cladding of Roller Coaster seen in 1974

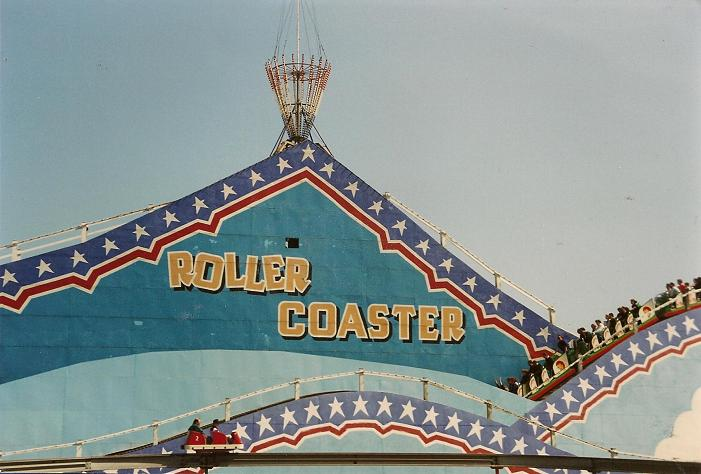
The top of the lift hill structure with the green train on the second drop

The yellow train at the highest point of the ride in 2008
