= Scenic Railway (Dreamland Margate) =

Roller coaster at Dreamland Margate in Kent, UK

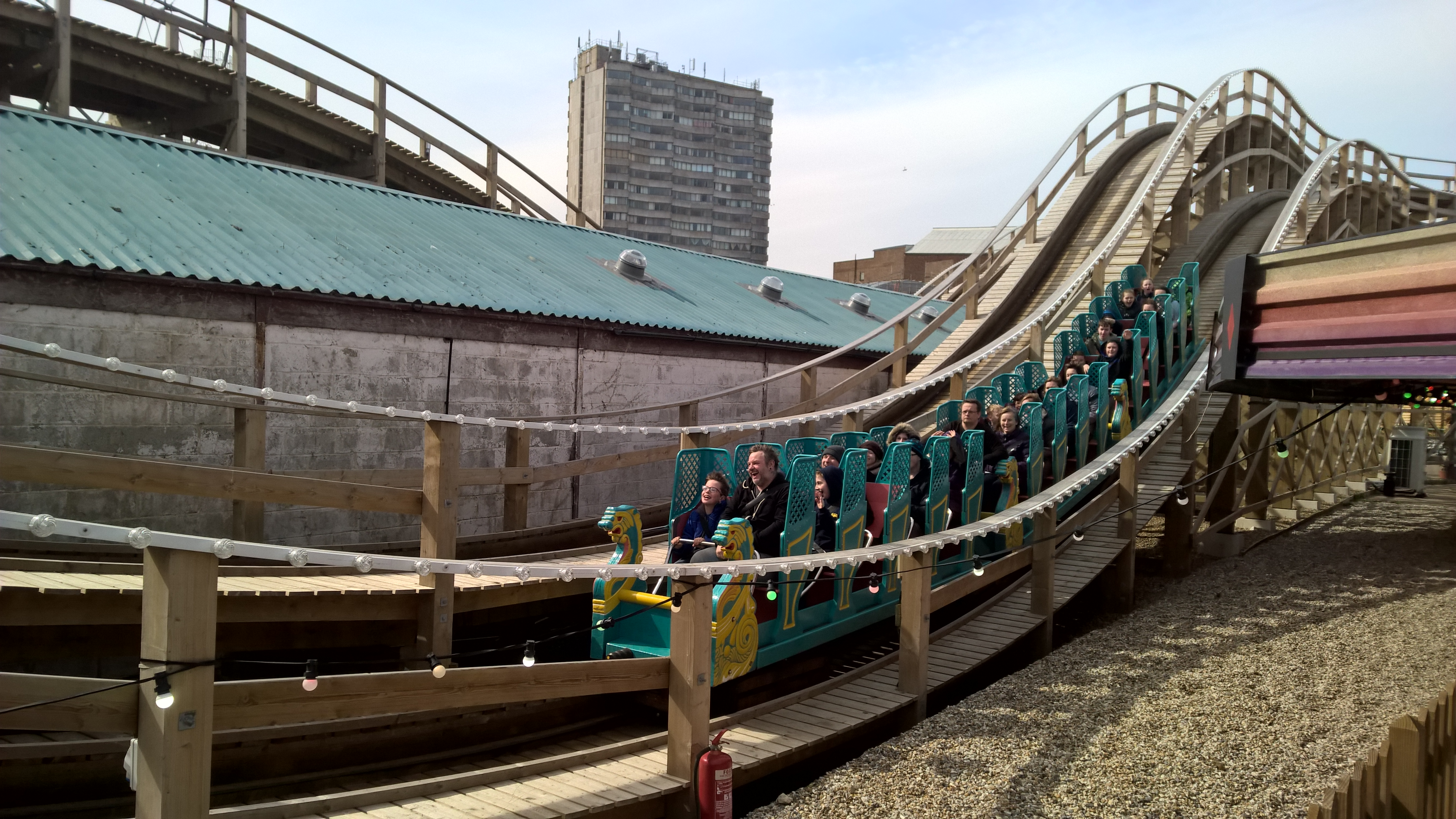
- The Scenic Railway in 2016

Dreamland Margate
- Location: Dreamland Margate
- Coordinates: 51°23′7″N 1°22′39″E
- Status: Closed
- Opening date: 3 July 1920
- Closing date: 11 August 2024

General statistics
- Type: Wood
- Model: Scenic Railway
- Lift/launch system: Cable (two lifts)
- Height: 40 ft (12 m)
- Drop: 40 ft (12 m)
- Length: 3,000 ft (910 m)
- Speed: 35 mph (56 km/h)
- Duration: 4 minutes
- Height restriction: 125 cm (4 ft 1 in)
- Trains: 2 trains with 3 cars; riders are arranged 2 across in 5 rows, except for the second car with the brakeman's seat in 4 rows, for a total of 28 riders per train.
- Scenic Railway at RCDB

The Scenic Railway was a wooden roller coaster located at the Dreamland Amusement Park in Margate, United Kingdom. First opened in 1920, the ride was distinctive compared to modern-day roller coasters, as a brakeman was required to travel with the train to control its speed, manually applying brakes when needed. UK's English Heritage granted the roller coaster Grade II listed status in 2002 and Grade II* listed status in 2011, when it was the oldest operating roller coaster in the UK and one of only eight scenic railways in the world. The Scenic Railway was non-operational from 2006 until 2015 amid park closure and restoration following an arson attack. The ride was closed in August 2024 due to a derailing incident, and has remained standing but not operating since. In January 2026 it was announced that the ride would no longer operate.

== History ==
The Scenic Railway in the 1930s

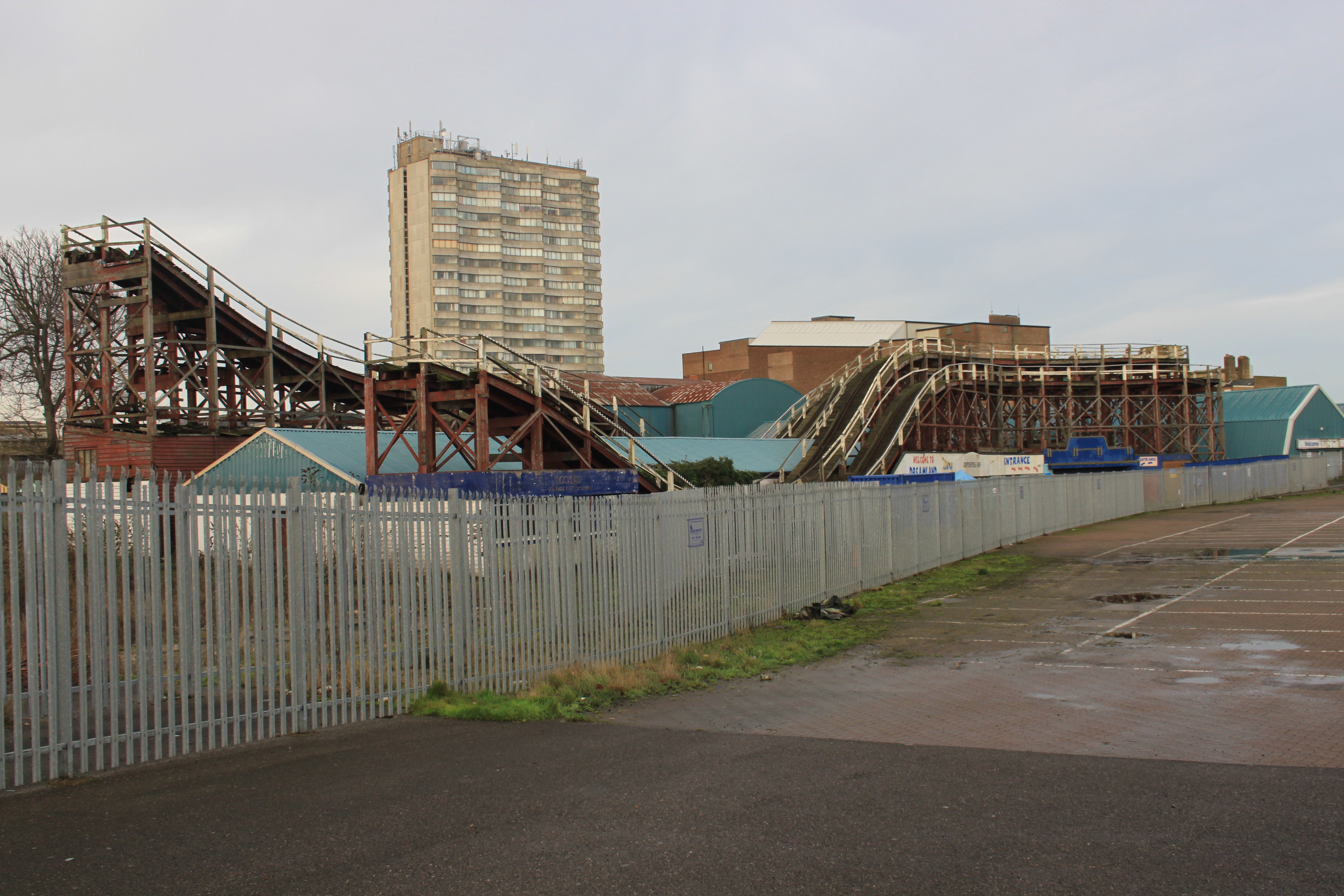
The remains of the Scenic Railway in January 2013

In 1919, John Henry Iles bought the European usage rights to the scenic railway from LaMarcus Adna Thompson, who had patented the scenic railway design in 1884. Iles was the founder and co-owner of Dreamland and had the Scenic Railway constructed at Dreamland from local timber and had mechanical parts for the ride shipped over from the US. The ride drew on ideas from several other designers, but was constructed by local carpenters within the area specified by Iles.

The Scenic Railway was owned by Iles until 1938, when the ownership was passed to his son Henry Frederick "Eric" Iles. Following the outbreak of the Second World War in 1939, the Scenic Railway ceased operations until June 1946.

Fire destroyed part of the ride in 1949 and the structure required major repairs. Replacement timber for the ride was bought from the dismantled pier at Lowestoft and the ride re-opened in 1950. Fire again destroyed parts of the ride in 1957.

Some of the five original trains constructed for the Scenic Railway were sold to Battersea Fun Fair in the 1960s where they were used on the Big Dipper scenic railway. It was one of the ex-Dreamland trains that was involved in the accident in 1972 when five children were killed and several injured. It was during the aftermath of this accident that most of the wooden roller coasters in Britain's amusement parks were removed as, irrespective of the actual standards of safety on the rides, public confidence had been dented.

The Scenic Railway was successfully granted Grade II listed status in 2002, making it the first roller coaster ever to be given any form of protection against demolition.

In 2003, Jimmy Godden, Dreamland's owner since 1996, announced that the park would be closed and sold due to redevelopment of the area. Several showmen continued to operate the park and the Scenic Railway, and a campaign was established to save them. In 2005, Dreamland was sold to Margate Town Centre Regeneration Company. The following year, the park closed and all rides, except the protected Scenic Railway, were removed.

On 7 April 2008, the Scenic Railway was targeted in an arson attack, and a significant portion of the ride was damaged. In 2011 the ride's listing status was upgraded from Grade II to Grade II* despite the fire damage due to the rarity of the ride and its international significance as one of the world's oldest roller coasters.

=== Restoration ===
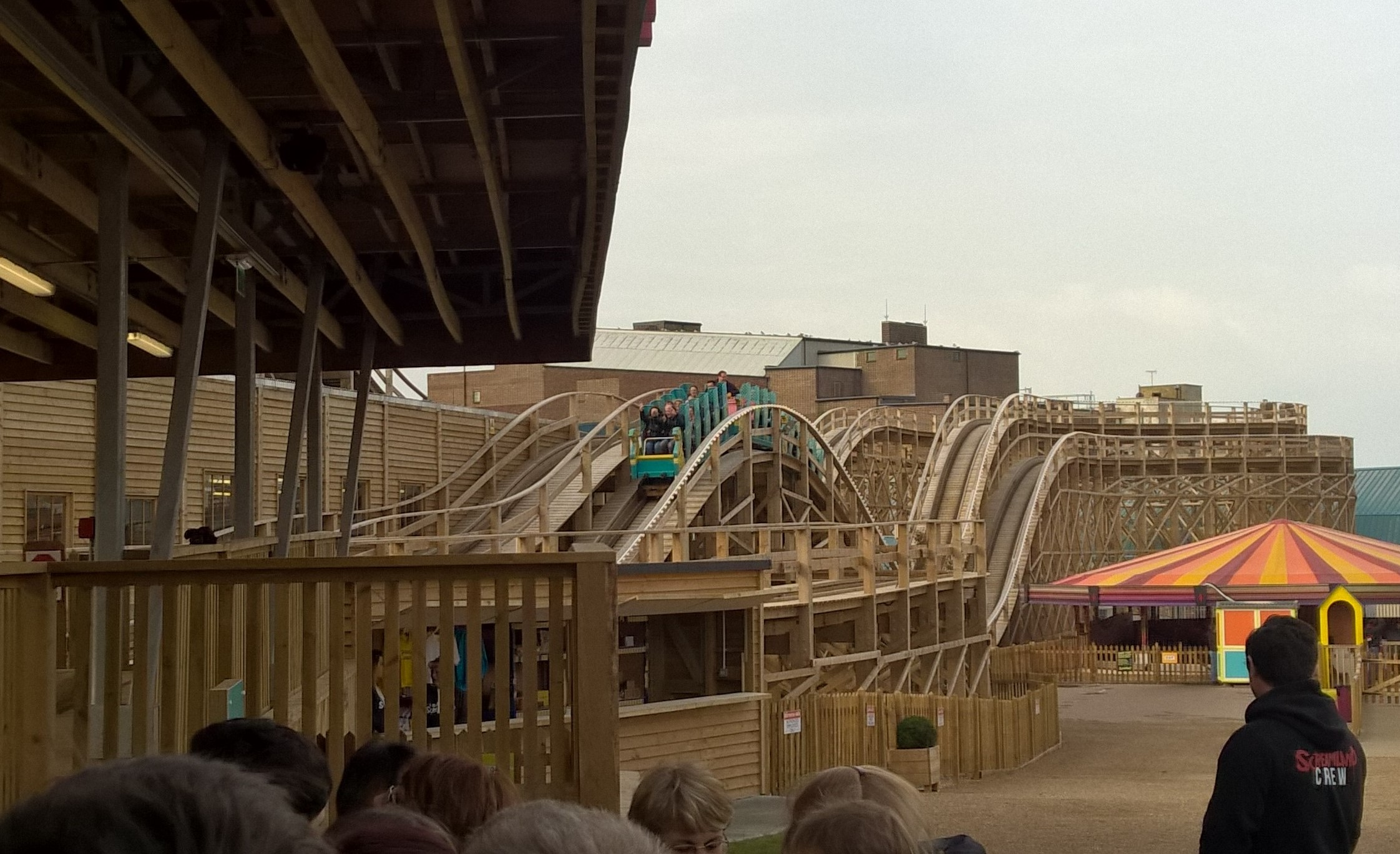
The Scenic Railway shortly after reopening in 2015

Dreamland restored the Scenic Railway as part of a broader initiative to rejuvenate the amusement park. On 16 November 2009, the Dreamland Heritage Trust was awarded a £3.7 million grant by UK's Department for Culture, Media and Sport to restore the Scenic Railway and other historic areas of the park. The restoration was also funded by Thanet District Council, Heritage Lottery Fund and several local parties.

Topbond Plc of Kent were contracted to rebuild the woodwork, while WGH Engineering from Doncaster restored the ride's mechanical operation. York-based designing and manufacturing company Stage One carried out the calculations and track design according to the original plan, and designed and installed modern control and safety systems in accordance with current regulations. The trains' wooden side panels and decorative "dragon heads" were CNC machined according to 3D scans taken from the original parts. A few original parts, such as the mechanical drive system of the lift hill cables, were preserved and restored.

Rebuilding the Scenic Railway required a total of 320 tonnes of timber. During restoration, the wooden structure that was in the midst of being rebuilt was knocked down by high winds in December 2014, which set back the timeline to reopen the attraction.

After an extensive repair process, the Scenic Railway reopened to the public on 15 October 2015. The restoration of the ride cost a total of £15 million, which was part of an £18 million investment to reopen the park.

In 2020, the Dreamland site, including the Scenic Railway, was sold to Sands Heritage Limited, for £7 million. As of 2023, Sands Heritage is owned by LN-Gaiety Holdings, a subsidiary of Live Nation Entertainment.

=== 2024 derailing incident and closure ===
On 10 August 2024, a train derailed and collided with one of the brake pads, causing damage to part of the structure. The incident was caused by the failure of the fastening screws of the flat steel bar that served as the rail. The raised end of the steel bar curled under the train's wheel, causing the train to derail and hit the wooden side of the track. No injuries were reported. The Scenic Railway was closed for repairs, and it remained closed for the entire 2025 season.

On 27 January 2026, Dreamland announced the permanent closure of the ride. The park stated that after an "extensive process of consultations and inspections," the decision was made to retire the roller coaster from operation, 105 years after its opening. Because the Scenic Railway is a listed structure, it cannot be demolished, and the park reported it is looking for other ways for people to enjoy it.

Following the closure, Thanet District Council was informed that the Health and Safety Executive had advised Dreamland to introduce a daily inspection routine to operate the ride, which the park deemed unviable. The park also claimed that decay was detected in the structure; the fast-growing softwood with sparse grain that was used in the restoration was reportedly not sufficient to achieve the expected service life. The park viewed that it would no longer be able to operate the ride, therefore closing it permanently.

The council wrote to culture secretary Lisa Nandy about the cultural and historical significance of the Scenic Railway; the Department for Culture, Media and Sport responded that decisions regarding the operation of the ride are a matter for the park's owner.

The funding secured by the Dreamland Heritage Trust was intended to support the operation of the Scenic Railway until 2037. The trust stated that it was not involved in discussions about the future of the ride, despite repeated attempts to contact the park owner.

In May 2026, Dreamland stated it is currently developing a "Scenic Railway exhibit focused on education and heritage," which is scheduled to open in 2027.

== Ride description ==
The ride consists of a wooden-tracked railway with flat steel rails supported by a wooden structure. The ride occupies a space approximately 580 ft long (180 m) and 120 ft wide (37 m). The track is in a trough, and as such this scenic railway is often incorrectly referred to as a side-friction coaster. The train actually made no contact with the trough walls; they are present simply to provide some lateral protection from derailment. The running wheels were flanged like those of railway vehicles, preventing the train from moving sideways off the track. The layout of the track consists of a double-loop with two cable lift-hill sections. The drops off both of the lift hills are double-drops.

The trains of the ride consisted of three cars mounted on bogies. The bodies and much of the chassis of the cars were wooden, and 28 riders could travel on each train. The brakeman rode between the first and second cars on the bogie and operated the brakes with a large lever. When the lever was pulled, the brake shoes under the bogie pressed against the rails, slowing the train down.

The original trains were destroyed by the fire in 2008, so new trains were constructed for the restored ride in 2015. Although the Scenic Railway originally had five trains, two new trains were built during the restoration. The new trains differed in some respects from the originals, as they had to be built to meet current regulations. High sides were added to the seats to prevent passengers from reaching out of the carriage, and safety belts were added to the seats in addition to lap bars. Permanent magnets were also installed under the bogies, which automatically slowed the train's speed as it ran over metal plates installed on the track. The new trains still had a brakeman, but with the new magnetic braking system, their role in braking the train became less necessary.

In 2022, the minimum height requirement was 125 cm (49 inches), and a ticket to ride cost £5.
