= Jimmy Godden (entrepreneur) =

English businessman (died 2012)

- Born: James Godden; December 1945; Folkestone, Kent, England
- Died: 27 March 2012 (aged 66); Royal Marsden Hospital, London
- Occupation: Businessman
- Known for: Involvement in amusement parks in Kent
- Children: 3

Jimmy Godden (December 1945 – 27 March 2012) was a businessman from Kent. He was involved in a range of venues and projects including Dreamland Margate, the Rotunda Amusement Park in Folkestone and Ramsgate Pleasure Park.

== Early life ==
Godden was born in Folkestone, Kent. He started a career as a builder, prior to marrying into a family involved in Folkestone Rotunda.

== Career ==
In 1990, Godden purchased Folkestone Rotunda amusement park, a prominent seafront attraction, prior to its closure.

In March 1991, Godden pleaded guilty to bribing a councillor on Thanet District Council, receiving a six-month suspended prison sentence and a £25,000 fine.

In 1992, Godden purchased the Feathers Funfair in Dymchurch.

In 1993, Godden demolished the Grade II listed 18th-century Ark Café in Folkestone, citing hurricane damage, despite opposition from local conservationists.

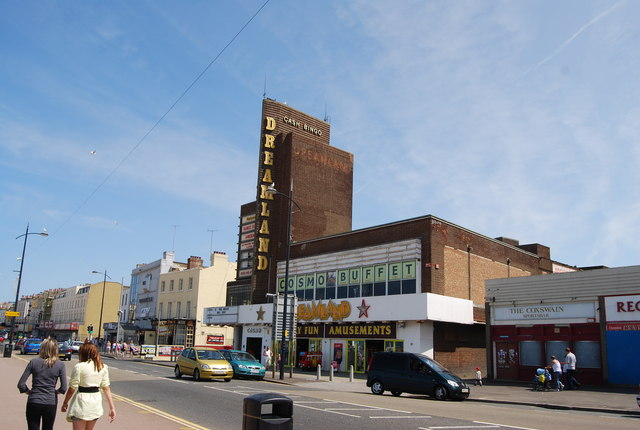
Dreamland Margate, one of Godden's venues.

In 1995, Godden acquired Dreamland Margate from the Bembom family. During his tenure, the Ferris wheel and the looping swingboat Mary Rose were removed.

== Failed projects ==
Godden was involved in several proposed developments that were not completed. In the mid-1990s, his Chamelion Group proposed a major leisure complex on the derelict Ramsgate Hoverport, including 250 holiday apartments, an indoor ski slope, a swimming pool, and other amenities, with funding expected in part from European Union development grants. The proposal led to the demolition of the existing terminal building, but negotiations with Thanet District Council broke down in 1996.

At the Pleasurama site on Ramsgate seafront, located on the former Ramsgate Harbour railway station, Godden had obtained permission to develop a shopping centre. However, the site was destroyed by fire before the development could proceed and was subsequently compulsorily purchased by Thanet District Council.

Several of Godden's properties were damaged or destroyed by fires, some of which were suspected to be deliberate. These included the listed Scenic Railway at Dreamland, which was damaged in an arson attack on 7 April 2008, the Pleasurama fun park in Ramsgate, and the Mr G arcade on Margate seafront. The latter site remained vacant and became locally known as "Godden's Gap".

== Personal life ==
He was married twice and had three sons.

Godden and one of his sons were kidnapped by men in balaclavas in December 1991, with the aim of extracting a ransom. The kidnapping was abandoned when a police patrol happened upon the kidnap in progress, and the kidnappers fled. Property worth £100,000 was taken and Godden's insurance company offered a £10,000 reward for information leading to the conviction of the gang.

He died from cancer at the Royal Marsden Hospital in March 2012.
