= Fun slide =

Amusement ride

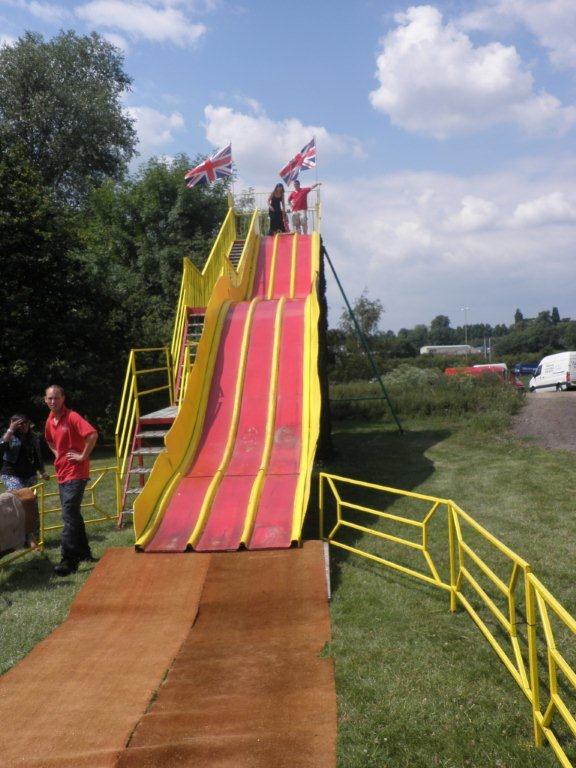
A fun slide at a carnival in the UK

A fun slide, also known as a giant slide, astroglide slide, or cascade slide, is an amusement ride. A rider walks up the stairs to get to the top of this slide along with a mat. The rider places the mat on the slide, sits on the mat, and slides down the ride.

Fun slides come in different lengths and numbers of slide lines including the State Fair 5 lane, 90 foot 3/4 lane, and the 65 foot 3/4 lane. The ride can be made faster using a beeswax polish or can be slowed using a sugar-based soda. Sometimes coconut or rubber matting lies on the bottom of the ride to bring the riders to a safe stop.

== History ==
One of the earliest references to fun slides being in carnivals or amusement parks is the Panama slide at Steeplechase Park inside Coney Island. Built in 1908, the slide was made of maple wood and was invented by George Tilyou. The slide is visible in a 1932 promotional video for the park. The slogan promoted was "It takes stout hearts and rugged clothes to negotiate the Panama Slide."

Another early example is at Glenn Echo Park in 1911. The Washington Herald published an article discussing the new rides and changes coming to the park, mentioning a "giant slide-ride, said to be the largest in the United States." This slide was supposedly 90 ft tall and like the slide in Coney Island, made of polished maple wood, and riders rode down on burlap sacks.

The slide evolved in 1965 when Fred Pittroff saw a 20 ft tall fun slide at a Santa Cruz amusement park. In an interview with Minnesota Public Radio News Pittroff recalls that riders were breaking their ankles when they hit up against the lane dividers on the slide. He took the idea home with him to the Minnesota State Fair and created a 40ft version with corrugated steel and ridges so the riders would have a smoother safer ride. This slide is still open every year at the Minnesota State Fair and is still run by the Pittroff family.

Hersheypark installed a fun slide called the "Magic Carpet Slide" in 1969. It was produced by Aero-Mar Plastics, Inc. and had 15 lanes for riders. The ride was torn down after four seasons and replaced with the Hershey Park Amphitheater.

Modern examples are the rooftop slide at the St. Louis City Museum, the Giant Slide at Belle Isle in Detroit, and the Fun Slide at Paradise Park in Novi, Michigan.
