= John Iles =

English musician, cricketer and entrepreneur (1871–1951)

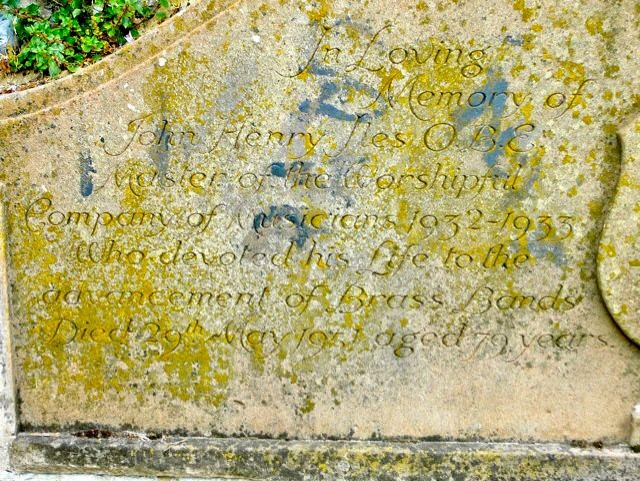
- Grave of Iles

Personal information
- Born: 17 September 1871; Bristol, England
- Died: 29 May 1951 (aged 79); Birchington, Kent, England
- Batting: Right-handed

Domestic team information
- Years: Team
- 1890–1891: Gloucestershire
- Source: Cricinfo, 30 March 2014

John Henry Iles OBE (17 September 1871 – 29 May 1951) was an English entrepreneur, musician and cricketer. He played for Gloucestershire between 1890 and 1891.

In 1898, he acquired the British Bandsman magazine, and in 1900, he founded the National Brass Band Championships of Great Britain.

In 1919 - just before Christmas, Iles purchased the Hall-By-The-Sea in Margate, Kent previously run by Lord George Sanger. He paid £40,000 for the park but spent £500,000 developing his vision of an American style amusement park for Kent which he renamed Dreamland. Almost immediately in 1920 he built the iconic Scenic Railway, now a grade II* listed structure that is still in use and also the oldest rollercoaster in the UK.

He was master of the Worshipful Company of Musicians from 1932–3, and inaugurated the John Henry Iles medal in 1947. He was awarded an OBE in 1947 for services to the brass band movement.
