= List of Desert Island Discs episodes (1951–1960) =

The BBC Radio 4 programme Desert Island Discs invites castaways to choose eight pieces of music, a book (in addition to the Bible – or a religious text appropriate to that person's beliefs – and the Complete Works of Shakespeare) and a luxury item that they would take to an imaginary desert island, where they will be marooned indefinitely. The rules state that the chosen luxury item must not be anything animate or indeed anything that enables the castaway to escape from the island, for instance a radio set, sailing yacht or aeroplane. The luxury was not introduced to the programme until after about 100 programmes and the book after about 400 programmes. The choices of book and luxury can sometimes give insight into the guest's life, and the choices of guests between 1951 and 1960 are listed here.

== 1951 ==
Date	Castaway	Book	Luxury
3 January 1951	Eric Portman	No book	No item
10 January 1951	Monica Dickens	No book	No item
17 January 1951	Robertson Hare	No book	No item
24 January 1951	Yvonne Arnaud	No book	No item
31 January 1951	Donald Peers	No book	No item
7 February 1951	Peter Scott	No book	No item
14 February 1951	Constance Cummings	No book	No item
21 February 1951	Jack Buchanan	No book	No item
28 February 1951	Kay Hammond	No book	No item
7 March 1951	Peter Ustinov	No book	No item
14 March 1951	Joan Hammond	No book	No item
21 March 1951	John Clements	No book	No item
28 March 1951	Ted Kavanagh	No book	No item
4 April 1951	Anona Winn	No book	No item
11 April 1951	Muir Mathieson	No book	No item
18 April 1951	Peter Fleming	No book	No item
25 April 1951	Margaret Lockwood	No book	Crossword puzzles
2 May 1951	Petula Clark	No book	No item
9 May 1951	Larry Adler	No book	No item
16 May 1951	Denis Compton and Bill Edrich	No book	No item
23 May 1951	Ann Todd	No book	No item
30 May 1951	Maggie Teyte	No book	No item
6 June 1951	Tommy Trinder	No book	No item
13 June 1951	Gracie Fields	No book	No item
20 June 1951	Eric Coates	No book	No item
27 June 1951	Bill Johnson	No book	No item
4 July 1951	Stanley Holloway	No book	No item
11 July 1951	Cicely Courtneidge	No book	No item
18 July 1951	Leslie Henson	No book	No item
25 July 1951	Jean Kent	No book	No item
1 August 1951	Jimmy Edwards	No book	Euphonium
8 August 1951	Joyce Grenfell	No book	No item
15 August 1951	A. E. Matthews	No book	No item
22 August 1951	Phyllis Calvert	No book	No item
29 August 1951	Vivian Ellis	No book	No item
5 September 1951	Anne Crawford	No book	No item
12 September 1951	Freddie Mills	No book	No item
16 September 1951	Sally Ann Howes	No book	Garlic
25 September 1951	George Robey	No book	No item
2 October 1951	Mai Zetterling	No book	No item
9 October 1951	Henry Kendall	Who's Who in the Theatre	No item
23 October 1951	Gerald Moore	No book	A double bass
30 October 1951	Clemence Dane	No book	No item
6 November 1951	Ronald Shiner	No book	Any animal which he could train
13 November 1951	Diana Wynyard	No book	El Medico by Goya
20 November 1951	George Formby	No book	His first ukulele
27 November 1951	Kathleen Harrison	The Pickwick Papers by Charles Dickens	No item
4 December 1951	Elisabeth Schumann	No book	No item
11 December 1951	John Mills	No book	No item
18 December 1951	Vera Lynn	No book	Curling tongs

== 1952 ==
Date	Castaway	Book	Luxury
1 January 1952	Jack Hulbert	No book	Cigarettes
8 January 1952	Carroll Gibbons	No book	Music manuscript paper
15 January 1952	Sybil Thorndike	No book	A blue vase, an engagement present
22 January 1952	Spike Hughes	No book	A barrel of wine
29 January 1952	Jeanne de Casalis	No book	A picture by Cézanne or a large feather bed
5 February 1952	Peter Brough and Archie Andrews	No book	Golf clubs
19 February 1952	Compton Mackenzie	No book	Four pipes and matches
26 February 1952	Elizabeth Welch	No book	No item
4 March 1952	Roger Livesey	No book	Golf clubs
11 March 1952	Hermione Gingold	No book	A barrel of lipstick
18 March 1952	Fred Emney	No book	A large box of cigars
26 March 1952	Anna Neagle	No book	Tea
1 April 1952	Richard Hearne	No book	No item
8 April 1952	Wynford Vaughan-Thomas	No book	Combined radio and television receiver
15 April 1952	Delia Murphy	No book	A still for making poteen
22 April 1952	Richard Murdoch and Kenneth Horne	No book	Murdoch – A test-your-strength fairground machine Horne – a mah-jong set
29 April 1952	Kirsten Flagstad	No book	Knitting needles and wool
13 May 1952	Fay Compton	No book	Her two dogs
20 May 1952	Robert Beatty	No book	No item
27 May 1952	Dorothy Dickson	No book	No item
3 June 1952	Gilbert Harding	No book	A Kelly Man
10 June 1952	Googie Withers	No book	A jade amulet
17 June 1952	Godfrey Winn	No book	A pack of cards for bridge
24 June 1952	Ellaline Terriss	No book	A piano
1 July 1952	Boyd Neel	No book	A gramophone for slow-playing records
8 July 1952	Fred Perry	No book	Radio transmitter
15 July 1952	Henry Hall	No book	A watch
22 July 1952	Gladys Cooper	No book	No item
29 July 1952	Christopher Stone	No book	A good soft bed
5 August 1952	Joan Greenwood	No book	Cigarettes
12 August 1952	Michael Denison and Dulcie Gray	No book	Denison – a raft (to fish); Gray – a large supply of insecticide
19 August 1952	Trevor Howard	No book	One of his wife's cakes
26 August 1952	Anne Shelton	Kon-Tiki by Thor Heyerdahl	The little cross that hangs over her bed
2 September 1952	Richard Attenborough	No book	Set of record catalogues
9 September 1952	Vivien Leigh	No book	A piano
16 September 1952	Ted Ray	No book	A dozen hairnets
23 September 1952	Winifred Atwell	No book	A comb (for hair and making comb and paper music)
3 October 1952	Esmond Knight	The Story of Art by Ernst Gombrich	No item
10 October 1952	Binnie Hale	No book	A piano
17 October 1952	Joy Worth	No book	A very expensive piece of jewellery
24 October 1952	Florence Desmond	No book	Family photograph album
31 October 1952	W. J. MacQueen-Pope	No book	One of his lucky charms
7 November 1952	Tessie O'Shea	No book	Her ukulele
14 November 1952	Nigel Patrick	No book	His 'useless' dog
21 November 1952	Ada Reeve	No book	A workbox for embroidery
28 November 1952	Sonnie Hale	No book	Scented Soap
5 December 1952	Gordon Harker	No book	A camera and lots of film
12 December 1952	Bill Greenslade	No book	No item
19 December 1952	Joy Nichols	No book	A mink sleeping bag

- Chose as one of his records a football commentary by Raymond Glendenning of Bolton Wanderers versus Chelsea F.C., 2 June 1945.

== 1953 ==
Date	Castaway	Book	Luxury
2 January 1953	Wilfred Pickles	The Oxford Book of English Verse	His yellow waistcoat
9 January 1953	Margaret Rutherford	No book	A bejewelled golden comb
16 January 1953	Ralph Lynn	No book	His eyeglass
23 January 1953	Belita	No book	An encyclopedia
30 January 1953	Duncan Carse	No book	A pin-up picture
6 February 1953	Donald Wolfit	The Bible	A violin with instruction book
13 February 1953	Jean Carson	No book	An umbrella
20 February 1953	David Tomlinson	No book	Eddie Gray's juggling equipment
27 February 1953	Sheila Sim	No book	A clock
6 March 1953	Richard Todd	No book	No item
13 March 1953	Pamela Brown	No book	Encyclopædia Britannica
20 March 1953	Max Miller	No book	A double pack of cards
27 March 1953	Moira Lister	A book about astronomy	A guitar
3 April 1953	Webster Booth	No book	An ivory pig – his lucky charm
10 April 1953	Yolande Donlan	A Mediterranean cookbook	No item
17 April 1953	Norman Wisdom	No book	Motor car and petrol
24 April 1953	Isabel Jeans	No book	Her St Christopher's Medal
1 May 1953	John Arlott	No book	The biggest second-hand bookshop in the world
8 May 1953	Jack Hawkins	No book	No item
15 May 1953	Naunton Wayne	No book	No item
22 May 1953	Arthur Wint	No book	No item
29 May 1953	Pamela Kellino	Madame Bovary by Gustave Flaubert	No item
12 June 1953	Sir Ralph Richardson	No book	His pipe
19 June 1953	Robert Helpmann	No book	A box of paints
26 June 1953	Leo Genn	No book	A chess set with a book of problems
2 July 1953	Lizbeth Webb	No book	Nicholas, her three-inch-tall boy mascot
10 July 1953	Geraldine McEwan	No book	A box of watercolours
17 July 1953	Cecil Parker	Oxford Book of Quotations	No item
24 July 1953	Brian Reece	No book	A ventriloquist's dummy
31 July 1953	Cyril Ritchard	No book	A photograph of his wife, Madge Elliott
7 August 1953	Nora Swinburne	The Bible	Her make-up box and contents
14 August 1953	Hugh Williams	No book	A corkscrew
21 August 1953	Alfredo Campoli	No book	A football
28 August 1953	Leslie A "Hutch" Hutchinson	An anthology of world poetry	No item
4 September 1953	Hugh Sinclair	No book	No item
11 September 1953	Peggy Cummins	No book	A painting of circus horses by Toulouse-Lautrec
18 September 1953	Jack Warner	No book	A blue silk scarf
25 September 1953	Bernard Miles	The complete works of Shakespeare	No item

- Allowed 10 discs, due to time allowances.

== 1954 ==
Date	Castaway	Book	Luxury
17 September 1954	Mary Ellis	No book	A keg of eau de Cologne
24 September 1954	Vivian De Gurr St George	No book	A picture of his wife
1 October 1954	Jessie Matthews	No book	An enormous bottle of perfume
8 October 1954	John Betjeman	No book	The lower half of the west window of St Marys Church, Fairford, Gloucestershire
15 October 1954	T. E. B. Clarke	Ruff's Guide to the Turf	No item
22 October 1954	Valerie Hobson	No book	The Albert Memorial
29 October 1954	Nigel Balchin	No book	A figure of an urchin, sculpted by Donatello
5 November 1954	Evelyn Laye	No book	Her bed, complete with big French pillows
12 November 1954	Robert Henriques	No book	Oil paints
18 November 1954	Celia Johnson	A book on astronomy	A rose cutting and some English soil
25 November 1954	Captain M. E. B. Banks RM	No book	A painting of mushrooms by William Nicholson
2 December 1954	Reginald Dixon	No book	A harmonium
9 December 1954	Fred Hoyle	No book	A large photo of a lot of people at a race meeting
16 December 1954	Margaret Leighton	No book	Girl Guide camp bed
23 December 1954	Dorothy Ward	No book	A make-up box
30 December 1954	Bobby Howes	No book	Red and white wine

- 2nd appearance

== 1955 ==
Date	Castaway	Book	Luxury	More info
6 January 1955	Dorothy Tutin	No book	Piano	more
13 January 1955	Sir Cedric Hardwicke	No book	Newspaper	more
20 January 1955	Harriet Cohen	No book	Box of make-up	more
27 January 1955	Eric Ambler	No book	Novelist	more
10 February 1955	Robert Harris	No book	Tuning fork	more
17 February 1955	Sir Osbert Lancaster	No book	Venus de Milo	more
24 February 1955	Chris Chataway	No book	Underwater breathing apparatus	more
3 March 1955	Pat Smythe	No book	Guitar	more
10 March 1955	Pat Kirkwood	No book	Gardenia bush	more
17 March 1955	Sir Alan P Herbert	No book	Field glasses	more
24 March 1955	Tod Slaughter	No book	Harmonica	more
21 April 1955	Arthur Askey	No book	Piano	more
28 April 1955	Sir Malcolm Sargent	No book	Hot water bottle or ice machine	more
5 May 1955	Anthony Asquith	No book	Seaside pier with slot machines	more
12 May 1955	Tommy Farr	No book	Longest bar of soap in the world	more
19 May 1955	Barbara Kelly	No book	Beach ball	more
7 June 1955	Emlyn Williams	No book	Encyclopaedia	more
14 June 1955	Tony Mottram	No book	Writing paper and pencils	more
21 June 1955	Nicholas Monsarrat	No book	Autographed letters of Lord Nelson	more
28 June 1955	Michael Redgrave	No book	Pipes and matches	more
5 July 1955	Yehudi Menuhin	No book	Violin and strings	more
12 July 1955	Lionel Gamlin	No book	Back number of The New Yorker	more
19 July 1955	Ursula Jeans	No book	Suntan lotion	more
26 July 1955	Edward Allcard	No book	Five ton block of lead as keel for schooner	more
2 August 1955	Isobel Baillie	No book	Tea	more
9 August 1955	Michael Ayrton	No book	An ancient Greek sculpture	more
16 August 1955	Claire Bloom	No book	N/A	more
23 August 1955	R C Sherriff	No book	Scotch whisky	more
30 August 1955	Herbert Wilcox	No book	Toothbrush and toothpaste	more
6 September 1955	Eileen Joyce	No book	Encyclopaedia	more
13 September 1955	Philip Harben	No book	Field glasses	more
26 September 1955	Leslie Welch	No book	Bed	more
3 October 1955	John Gregson	No book	Guitar	more
10 October 1955	Max Bygraves	No book	Golf clubs	more
17 October 1955	James Robertson Justice	No book	Mixed flower seeds	more
24 October 1955	Sidonie Goossens	No book	Handbag	more
31 October 1955	Frances Day	No book	Piano	more
7 November 1955	Valentine Dyall	No book	Trumpet	more
14 November 1955	Vic Oliver	No book	Music manuscript paper	more
21 November 1955	Beverley Nichols	No book	Oil painting equipment	more
28 November 1955	Jack Train	No book	Rose bush	more
5 December 1955	Bernard Braden	No book	Pair of wife's earrings	more
12 December 1955	Bob Monkhouse and Denis Goodwin	Encyclopædia Britannica	Large coloured picture of Marilyn Monroe	more
26 December 1955	Sir Anton Dolin	No book	Photo album	more

== 1956 ==
Date	Castaway	Book	Luxury	More info
2 January 1956	Laurence Harvey	The Complete Works of Shakespeare	Barrel of wine	more
16 January 1956	Sam Costa	No book	Painting from the National Gallery	more
23 January 1956	Dora Bryan	No book	Stereoscope with slides of her family	more
6 February 1956	David Nixon	Alice in Wonderland by Lewis Carroll	Photograph of his wife and baby son	more
13 February 1956	Terry-Thomas	No book	Horse saddle	more
20 February 1956	Robert Fabian	No book	Umbrella	more
27 February 1956	Kenneth More	The Complete Works of Shakespeare	English rock garden	more
5 March 1956	Nancy Spain	Fifth Form of St. Dominic's by Talbot Baines	No item	more
12 March 1956	Donald Sinden	The Complete Works of Shakespeare	Lucky charm	more
19 March 1956	Vanessa Lee	Encyclopædia Britannica	Clock	more
26 March 1956	Cyril Smith	No book	Cards	more
2 April 1956	Bebe Daniels	No book	Typewriter and paper	more
9 April 1956	Stan Kenton	The Mature Mind by H. L. Overstreet	Unknown	more
16 April 1956	Marie Burke	Large book of short stories	Tea	more
23 April 1956	John Neville	No book	Landscape painting by Ivor Hitchins	more
30 April 1956	Athene Seyler	No book	Six feet of English hedgerow	more
7 May 1956	Len Harvey	No book	Box of books	more
14 May 1956	Dora Labbette	No book	Paper and pencils	more
21 May 1956	David Hughes	Encyclopædia Britannica	Golf clubs	more
28 May 1956	Robert Atkins	No book	Live performance of A Midsummer Night's Dream from the Regent's Park Open Air Theatre	more
4 June 1956	Stirling Moss	No book	Hair restorer	more
11 June 1956	Ted Heath	No book	Racing form books	more
18 June 1956	Eartha Kitt	Her autobiography	No item	more
25 June 1956	Eric Maschwitz	No book	Botticelli's Primavera	more
2 July 1956	Leslie Caron	No book	Artist's materials	more
9 July 1956	Jim Laker	No book	Cricket ball and a piano	more
16 July 1956	Eva Turner	No book	Dresden	more
23 July 1956	Tex Ritter	No book	Cards and a guitar	more
30 July 1956	Shirley Abicair	No book	Case of avocado pears	more
6 August 1956	Peter Ustinov	Encyclopaedia	Tennis racket	more
13 August 1956	Dennis Brain	Back number of motor magazines	Typewriter and paper	more
20 August 1956	Dennis Price	Volume of Giles cartoons	Painting materials	more
27 August 1956	Bernard Newman	No book	Atlas	more
3 September 1956	Humphrey Lyttelton	No book	Trumpet	more
10 September 1956	Harry Secombe	No book	Collapsible concrete model of Broadcasting House with plastic announcers etc.	more
17 September 1956	Valentine Britten	No book	Photograph of Battersea Power Station	more
24 September 1956	Turner Layton	No book	Piano	more
1 October 1956	Kenneth Tynan	No book	Pleasure gardens of Barcelona	more
8 October 1956	Ada Cherry Kearton	No book	Cards	more
15 October 1956	Peter Katin	No book	Painting of the Virgin of the Rocks	more
22 October 1956	Anthony Steel	No book	Portrait of his wife by Annigoni	more
29 October 1956	Isobel Barnett	No book	Hot water bottle	more
12 November 1956	Donald Campbell	No book	Cigarettes	more
19 November 1956	Dennis Noble	No book	Binoculars	more
26 November 1956	Malcolm Muggeridge	No book	Paper and pencils	more
3 December 1956	John Watt	No book	Thermos flask	more
10 December 1956	Spike Milligan	No book	Barometer	more
14 December 1956	Eight inhabitants from the Ascension Islands in the South Atlantic	No book	Unknown	more
17 December 1956	Peter Finch	Don Quixote by Miguel de Cervantes	Painting materials	more
24 December 1956	Janette Scott	No book	Complete glamour outfit	more
31 December 1956	Tyrone Power	No book	Leonardo da Vinci's notebooks	more

== 1957 ==
Date	Castaway	Book	Luxury	More info
7 January 1957	George Cansdale	No book	Field glasses	more
14 January 1957	Gerard Hoffnung	No book	His paintbox and tuba	more
21 January 1957	Dilys Powell	No book	Paper and pencils	more
28 January 1957	Zena Dare	No book	Mink coat	more
4 February 1957	Peter Sellers	The Pickwick Papers by Charles Dickens	Snorkel outfit	more
11 February 1957	Peggy Ashcroft	No book	Frogwoman's outfit	more
18 February 1957	Jack Solomons	No book	Punchbag	more
25 February 1957	Edgar Lustgarten	No book	Woman's evening gown	more
4 March 1957	Anthony Quayle	No book	Writing materials	more
11 March 1957	Elizabeth Bowen	Emma by Jane Austen	Kaledioscope	more
18 March 1957	Alan Melville	No book	Tennis practice wall, rackets and balls	more
25 March 1957	Bud Flanagan	No book	Premium bonds	more
1 April 1957	Chris Brasher	No book	Sailing dinghy	more
8 April 1957	Cicely Courtneidge	No book	Family photograph album	more
15 April 1957	Ralph Wightman	No book	Pipe cleaners	more
22 April 1957	Tommy Steele	Do-it-yourself book	No item	more
29 April 1957	Gwen Catley	No book	Painting of London to be commissioned from Graham Sutherland	more
6 May 1957	David Attenborough	No book	Piano	more
13 May 1957	Rawicz & Landauer	Biographies of composers	Soap	more
20 May 1957	Dick Bentley	No book	Champagne-making kit	more
27 May 1957	Victor Borge	No book	Not paying tax or insurance	more
3 June 1957	Alec Robertson	Anthology of poetry	China cat	more
10 June 1957	Count Basie	No book	Picture of his family with a New York City background	more
17 June 1957	Percy Edwards	No book	John Constable's painting of Willy Lott's cottage	more
24 June 1957	Mantovani	No book	Music manuscript paper, pencils and rubber	more
1 July 1957	Harold Hobson	No book	Cricket bat	more
8 July 1957	Tamara Karsavina	No book	Wooden statue of St Florian	more
15 July 1957	Fred Streeter	Gardening dictionary	Greenhouse for growing orchids	more
22 July 1957	Blanche Thebom	No book	Jewelled gold statuette of St George and the Dragon from the Shutzkammar, Munich	more
29 July 1957	Audrey Russell	No book	Astronomical telescope	more
5 August 1957	Tony Hancock	No book	Television set	more
12 August 1957	Owen Berry	No book	Photograph of Granny Grove	more
19 August 1957	Leopold Stokowski	No book	Tape recorder	more
26 August 1957	David Farrar	No book	Golf clubs and balls	more
2 September 1957	Alma Cogan	No book	Paper, pencils and paints	more
9 September 1957	Eric Barker	No book	Cricket bowling machine	more
16 September 1957	C A Lejeune	No book	Soil and rose bushes	more
23 September 1957	Christopher Stone	No book	Paper and fountain pen	more
30 September 1957	Marius Goring	No book	Piano	more
7 October 1957	Moura Lympany	A la recherche du temps perdu by Marcel Proust	Flower seeds	more
14 October 1957	John Dankworth	Cricket annuals from 1920 onwards	Saxophone	more
21 October 1957	Commander Ibbett	No book	Barrel of beer	more
28 October 1957	Belinda Lee	No book	Language teaching records for all languages	more
4 November 1957	Bransby Williams	No book	Paper and pencils	more
11 November 1957	Jack Teagarden	No book	Trombone and materials for making a crystal radio	more
18 November 1957	Joan Cross	No book	Cards	more
25 November 1957	James Fisher	No book	Field glasses and modern plumbing	more
2 December 1957	Moira Shearer	No book	Champagne	more
9 December 1957	Eric Sykes	No book	Typewriter and paper	more
16 December 1957	Earl Hines	No book	Piano	more
23 December 1957	Sir Thomas Beecham	No book	Havana cigars	more
30 December 1957	Lupino Lane	No book	Camera	more

== 1958 ==
Date	Castaway	Book	Luxury	More info
6 January 1958	Wendy Toye	No book	Framed Ronald Searle drawings	more
13 January 1958	Lionel Hale	No book	Model theatre	more
20 January 1958	Max Jaffa	No book	Violin and champagne	more
27 January 1958	Victor Silvester	No book	Piano	more
3 February 1958	Anton Walbrook	No book	Indo-Chinese Buddha	more
10 February 1958	Rex Palmer	No book	Alcohol	more
17 February 1958	Ben Lyon	No book	Film projector and films of his family	more
24 February 1958	Margaret Rawlings	No book	Tapestry-making kit	more
3 March 1958	Michael Flanders and Donald Swann	No book	Two pianos	more
10 March 1958	Beryl Grey	No book	Swedish wooden horse	more
17 March 1958	Frankie Vaughan	No book	Painting materials	more
24 March 1958	Flora Robson	No book	Sunbathing oil	more
31 March 1958	Geraldo	No book	Piano	more
7 April 1958	Ian Carmichael	No book	Writing materials and beer	more
14 April 1958	Cleo Laine	No book	Perfume	more
21 April 1958	Billy Mayerl	No book	Well-stocked bar	more
28 April 1958	Ruby Miller	A novel by Somerset Maugham	Perfume	more
5 May 1958	Oliver Messel	No book	Painting materials	more
12 May 1958	Roy Plomley	Who's Who in the Theatre	Desk with typewriter and paper	more
19 May 1958	Agnes Nicholls	Illustrated dictionary	Perfume	more
26 May 1958	Kay Smart	No book	Champagne	more
2 June 1958	Eric Robinson	No book	£1 million in pound notes	more
9 June 1958	Naomi Jacob	No book	Soap	more
16 June 1958	Jean Sablon	No book	Menu from Maxim's restaurant in Paris	more
23 June 1958	Derek McCulloch	Encyclopaedia	Inflatable pillow	more
30 June 1958	Sarah Vaughan	No book	Golf clubs and balls	more
7 July 1958	Tito Gobbi	No book	Expensive ivory back-scratcher	more
14 July 1958	Wilfrid Hyde-White	No book	Picture of Charlie Chaplin and model of a Rolls-Royce	more
21 July 1958	Jean Pougnet	War and Peace by Leo Tolstoy	Cask of brandy	more
28 July 1958	Elisabeth Schwarzkopf	French cookery book	Suntan oil	more
4 August 1958	Eamonn Andrews	Collected short stories of Somerset Maugham	Field glasses	more
11 August 1958	Elsie and Doris Waters	The Wind in the Willows by Kenneth Grahame and Diary of a Nobody by George Grossmith	Sunshade and garbage disposal unit	more
18 August 1958	Dr Ludwig Koch	No book	Hans Christian Andersen's mechanical bird and birdcage	more
25 August 1958	Hephzibah Menuhin	No book	Chinese language course	more
1 September 1958	Jack Payne	No book	Piano	more
8 September 1958	Percy Kahn	No book	Tape recorder	more
15 September 1958	Dickie Henderson	No book	Cine projector and films	more
22 September 1958	Alicia Markova	No book	Perfume	more
29 September 1958	Hardy Amies	No book	Dressing case	more
6 October 1958	Harry Belafonte	No book	Michelangelo's David	more
13 October 1958	Richard Dimbleby	No book	Piano	more
20 October 1958	Elizabeth Seal	No book	Tea	more
27 October 1958	Benno Moiseiwitsch	No book	Roulette table	more
3 November 1958	Edmundo Ros	No book	Film projector and films	more
10 November 1958	Elena Gerhardt	A philosophical work by Johann Wolfgang Goethe	Tapestry-making kit	more
17 November 1958	June Paul	No book	Painting by Gauguin	more
24 November 1958	G H Elliott	No book	Waistcoat (his mascot since 1903)	more
1 December 1958	Paul Robeson	No book	Carved Benin head	more
8 December 1958	Stanley Black	No book	Piano	more
15 December 1958	Aaron Copland	No book	Chess set	more
22 December 1958	Charlie Drake	Encyclopaedia	Regency candelabra	more
29 December 1958	Sandy MacPherson	No book	Radio set	more

== 1959 ==
Date	Castaway	Book	Luxury	More info
5 January 1959	Ronnie Boyer and Jeanne Ravel	Mysticism by Evelyn Underhill and Encyclopaedia	Soap and white tie and tails	more
12 January 1959	Ronald Searle	Reproductions of works by James Gillray	Car fitted with a telescope	more
19 January 1959	John Osborne	No book	Perfume	more
26 January 1959	Frederick Ashton	No book	Happy pills	more
2 February 1959	June Thorburn	No book	Mink stole	more
9 February 1959	Chris Barber	No book	Sports car and petrol	more
16 February 1959	John Morris	The Brothers Karamazov by Fyodor Dostoyevsky	Soap and a piano	more
23 February 1959	Peter Cushing	No book	Painting materials and model soldiers	more
2 March 1959	Cyril Fletcher	No book	Tape recorder	more
9 March 1959	Judy Grinham	War and Peace by Leo Tolstoy	Typewriter and paper	more
16 March 1959	Ernest Thesiger	No book	Painting materials	more
23 March 1959	Malcolm Arnold	Oxford Book of English Verse	Green Havana cigars	more
30 March 1959	Laurens van der Post	The Odyssey by Homer	Piano	more
6 April 1959	Sylvia Syms	Her husband's handwritten limericks	Tapestry-making materials	more
13 April 1959	Edric Connor	Cry, The Beloved Country by Alan Paton	Toothbrush	more
20 April 1959	Tyrone Guthrie	Anthology of poetry, some in French and German	Rum	more
27 April 1959	Marjorie Westbury	The Golden Bough by James Frazer	Blue-green silk robe with packets of flower seeds in the pockets	more
4 May 1959	Lord Brabazon of Tara	The Human Situation by MacNeill Dixon	Hot water bottle	more
11 May 1959	Ray Ellington	David Copperfield by Charles Dickens	Bed with mosquito net	more
18 May 1959	Dame Rebecca West	The plays of Jean Racine	Carved stone head of a Chinese philosopher	more
25 May 1959	Alfred Marks	Alice in Wonderland by Lewis Carroll	Telephone (out of service)	more
1 June 1959	Robert Farnon	Optics by Isaac Newton	Telescope	more
8 June 1959	Henry Sherek	Nicholas Nickleby by Charles Dickens	Epstein statue	more
15 June 1959	Brian Vesey-Fitzgerald	Complete Works by Jane Austen	Tobacco	more
22 June 1959	Lotte Lehmann	Faust by Johann Wolfgang Goethe	Paintbox	more
29 June 1959	Uffa Fox	Anthology of world poetry	Painting materials	more
6 July 1959	Hermione Baddeley	The Wind in the Willows by Kenneth Grahame	Painting by Renoir	more
13 July 1959	Harold Abrahams	Book of Quotations by Burton Egbert Stevenson	Microfilm of Bell's life	more
20 July 1959	George Melachrino	The works of Plato	Turkish delight	more
27 July 1959	Ivor Newton	London telephone directory	Champagne	more
3 August 1959	BC Hilliam	The Gilbert and Sullivan Book by Leslie Baily	Whisky	more
10 August 1959	Norman Fisher	The dialogues of Plato	Writing materials	more
17 August 1959	Bessie Love	The drawings of Fougasse	Eau de Cologne	more
24 August 1959	Charles Mackerras	Foreign translation of a long English novel	Wine	more
31 August 1959	John Snagge	The Little World of Don Camillo by Giovannino Guareschi	Painting by Rembrandt	more
7 September 1959	Sir Leonard Hutton	History of cricket	Golf clubs and balls	more
14 September 1959	Douglas Byng	The Rubaiyat of Omar Khayyam by Edward Fitzgerald	Photographs	more
21 September 1959	Peggy Cochrane	The Week-End Book	Piano	more
28 September 1959	Frankie Howerd	War and Peace by Leo Tolstoy	Photographs	more
5 October 1959	Robertson Hare	His autobiography	Telescope	more
12 October 1959	Dave Brubeck	Encyclopaedia	Piano	more
19 October 1959	Alfred Hitchcock	Mrs Beeton's Household Management	Continental railway timetable	more
26 October 1959	George Thalben-Ball	Three Men in a Boat by Jerome K. Jerome	White rug	more
2 November 1959	Steve Race	The House at Pooh Corner by A.A. Milne	Chess set	more
9 November 1959	Sir Arthur Bliss	Works on astronomy	Telescope	more
16 November 1959	Benny Hill	Collection of language courses	Film camera	more
23 November 1959	Joan Sutherland	Memoirs of Jenny Lind by Otto Goldschmidt	Bed	more
30 November 1959	Billy Cotton	Two historical novels	Ticket home	more
7 December 1959	John Paddy Carstairs	Roget's Thesaurus	Piano	more
14 December 1959	Andor Foldes	Anthology of English Verse by Edith Sitwell	The Dürer	more
21 December 1959	Eve Boswell	Book on one of the world's philosophies	Piano	more
28 December 1959	Ted Moult	The Pickwick Papers by Charles Dickens	Drawing equipment	more

== 1960 ==
Date	Castaway	Book	Luxury	More info
4 January 1960	S P B Mais	Original Greek works by Homer	Writing materials	more
11 January 1960	Semprini	The Nature of the Physical World by Sir Arthur Eddington	Telescope	more
18 January 1960	Joan Heal	The Complete Works of Oscar Wilde	Insecticide	more
25 January 1960	Antonia Ridge	The Canterbury Tales by Geoffrey Chaucer	Unbreakable spectacles	more
1 February 1960	Barrington Dalby	Book on tropical birds	Binoculars	more
8 February 1960	Herbert Lom	Nonsense rhymes by Edward Lear	Modelling clay	more
15 February 1960	Léon Goossens	Nautical almanac	Camp bed	more
22 February 1960	Sir Arthur Bryant	Life of Johnson by James Boswell	Painting by Kneller of a girl in a golden gown	more
29 February 1960	Jack Jackson	Do-it-yourself boat-building book	Television set	more
5 March 1960	Marty Wilde	Jane's All the World's Aircraft	Guitar	more
7 March 1960	Prince Chula Chakrabongse of Thailand	Who's Who	Family photo album	more
14 March 1960	Russ Conway	Omnibus edition of Hornblower stories by C. S. Forester	Typewriter and paper	more
21 March 1960	Michael Somes	Theatre Street by Tamara Karsavina	Telescope	more
28 March 1960	Sir Adrian Boult	Pilgrim's Progress by John Bunyan	Blanket	more
4 April 1960	Sidney James	Encyclopædia Britannica	Double bed	more
11 April 1960	John Freeman	Oxford English Dictionary	Typewriter	more
18 April 1960	Anne Heywood	What Then Must We Do by Leo Tolstoy	Painting materials	more
25 April 1960	Anthony Newley	Volume of short stories	Writing materials	more
2 May 1960	David Langdon	The novels of Charles Dickens	Piano	more
9 May 1960	Shirley Bassey	Robinson Crusoe by Daniel Defoe	Lipsticks	more
16 May 1960	Brian Rix	The plays of George Bernard Shaw	Tape recorder	more
23 May 1960	Liberace	The Magic of Believing by Claude M Bristol	Piano	more
30 May 1960	Marie Rambert	Paradise Lost by John Milton	Writing materials	more
6 June 1960	Dickie Henderson	How to Play Your Best Golf All the Time	Golf clubs and balls	more
13 June 1960	Professor A C B Lovell	Book on musical theory and composition	Piano/organ hybrid	more
20 June 1960	Julian Slade	War and Peace by Leo Tolstoy	Violin	more
27 June 1960	Sir Alec Guinness	Paradise Lost by John Milton	Apricot brandy	more
4 July 1960	Claudio Arrau	The works of Johann Wolfgang Goethe	Early Chinese statuette	more
11 July 1960	Eddie Calvert	Piano tutor	Piano	more
18 July 1960	C Day-Lewis	The novels of Jane Austen	Wine	more
25 July 1960	Antal Doráti	Personally-compiled anthology	Painting of a sleeping girl by Dominico Feti	more
1 August 1960	Johnny Morris	Finnegans Wake by James Joyce	Yeast	more
8 August 1960	Lord Boothby	The short stories of Somerset Maugham	Golf clubs and balls	more
15 August 1960	Danny Blanchflower	The Alexandria Quartet by Lawrence Durrell	Golf clubs and balls	more
22 August 1960	Pat Suzuki	Encyclopædia Britannica	Cosmetics	more
29 August 1960	Godfrey Talbot	Critical and Historical Essays by Thomas Macaulay	Writing materials	more
5 September 1960	Paul Beard	Droll Stories by Honoré de Balzac	Golf clubs and balls	more
12 September 1960	Gladys Young	London Belongs to Me by Norman Collins	Pairs of spectacles	more
19 September 1960	Michaela and Armand Denis	Encyclopædia Britannica and a book on mathematics	Diamond ring and a loud hailer	more
26 September 1960	Lionel Bart	Under Milk Wood by Dylan Thomas	Nelson's Column	more
3 October 1960	Diane Cilento	The Catcher in the Rye by J. D. Salinger	Painting materials	more
10 October 1960	Alec Bedser	Set of Wisden	Razor	more
17 October 1960	Sidney Torch	Three Men in a Boat by Jerome K. Jerome	Golf clubs and balls	more
24 October 1960	Ernest Lough	Manual on astronomy	Radio receiver	more
31 October 1960	Cliff Richard	The Swiss Family Robinson by Johann Wyss	Guitar	more
7 November 1960	Frederick Grisewood	Phantastes by George MacDonald	Compendium of parlour games	more
14 November 1960	Ursula Bloom	Book of Common Prayer	Writing materials	more
21 November 1960	Edmund Hockridge	Encyclopædia Britannica	Painting materials	more
28 November 1960	Frank Muir and Denis Norden	Cookery book and A Treasury of Ribaldry by Louis Untermeyer	Stradivarius violin and model of the Tower of London	more
5 December 1960	Oda Slobodskaya	The plays of Sheridan	Radio receiver	more
12 December 1960	Don Thompson	English Social History by G. M. Trevelyan	Clarinet	more
19 December 1960	Harry Mortimer	The Saint by Leslie Charteris	Cine camera	more
26 December 1960	Dave King	English dictionary	Football	more
