= William Smart =

William Smart may refer to:

== Sports ==
- Turkey Smart (William Smart, 1830–1919), British speed skater
- Bill Smart (born 1948) Canadian runner

== Others ==
- William Smart (economist) (1853–1915), Scottish economist
- William Marshall Smart (1889–1975), Scottish astronomer
- William Jackson Smart, father of Sonora Smart Dodd
- Billy Smart Sr. (1894–1966), British circus owner
- Billy Smart Jr. (1934–2005), British circus performer

== See also ==
- William Smarte (c. 1530–1599), MP for Ipswich
