= David Smart (disambiguation) =

David Smart may refer to:

- Dave Smart (born 1966), Canadian basketball coach
- David Smart (circus proprietor) (1929–2007), co-owner of the British Billy Smart's Circus
- David A. Smart (1892–1952), American magazine founder and editor, namesake of David and Alfred Smart Museum of Art in Chicago
- David Smart (bowls), Scottish bowls player
