= Kay Smart =

- Born: Kay Pentice; 13 March 1926; Lambeth, London, England
- Died: 25 September 2016 (aged 80); Jersey, Channel Islands
- Occupation: Circus performer
- Spouse: Ronnie Smart (m. 1950)
- Children: 3
- Relatives: Billy Smart Sr. (father-in-law); Billy Smart, Jr. (brother-in-law)

Kay Smart (née Pentice, 13 March 1926 – 25 September 2016) was an English circus performer, of the Smart's circus dynasty.

== Early life ==
Smart was born in Lambeth, London on 13 March 1926. Her father Albert Pentice was a circus acrobat. Her mother Adeline Pentice (née Manning), who performed as Adele Bromley, died when Kay was three. Smart worked as a trapeze artist as a child.

== Circus career ==
As a young women, Smart moved to Blackpool, Lancashire, where she worked as a conductor on the trolly buses, performed with a trapeze act called The Juleos and performed at Cody’s Circus.

Smart married to Billy Smart, Jr.'s brother, Ronnie Smart on 12 March 1950, making her the daughter-in-law of Billy Smart Sr. They had three children. Working at Smart's Circus, Smart took on a number of roles including presenting the animals in the ring, selling balloons, drinks and ice cream, and overseeing the orchestra. When Smart’s Circus stopped travelling in 1971, Smart and her husband set up Windsor Safari Park.

Smart appeared as a castaway on the BBC Radio programme Desert Island Discs on 26 May 1958. She also wrote the introduction to David Jamieson's book, Billy Smart's circus: a pictorial history (Circus Friends Association, 2004). Smart was also an Executive Committee Member of the Royal Variety Charity and a member of the Order of the Lady Ratlings.

== Death ==
Smart died in Jersey, Channel Islands, on 25 September 2016.
