= Lionel Gamlin =

British radio and newsreel broadcaster (1903–1967)

Lionel James Gamlin (30 April 1903 – 16 October 1967) was a British radio and newsreel announcer and presenter, and actor, who was known for his work for the BBC and British Movietone News between the 1930s and 1950s.

== Life and career ==
He was born in Birkenhead, and after leaving Birkenhead School started on a career in business and joined a local repertory company. He then became a teacher at his old school before studying at Fitzwilliam House, Cambridge, where he became President of the Cambridge Union in 1930 and editor of Granta. He returned to teaching and occasional work as an actor, before in 1936 being offered a post by the BBC as an announcer.

He provided the commentary in 1940 for both the RAF documentary Squadron 992 and the GPO Film Unit documentary War and Order, and compered the 1944 variety show Rainbow Round the Corner. During the Second World War, he was regarded as "a voice of authority, the tone of war and peace, the man whom people heard in the cinema on the newsreels." In 1946 he co-wrote a humorous book with Anthony Gilbert, Don’t Be Afreud! A Short Guide to Youth Control (The Book of the Weak), and in 1947 published You're on the Air: A Book about Broadcasting. He also chose the stage name for John Theobald Clarke, who subsequently became known as the actor and director Bryan Forbes.

In the late 1940s and 1950s he worked on BBC radio, presenting and conducting interviews on In Town Tonight, presenting Top of the Form, and producing children's programmes. He became "a stalwart of light entertainment broadcasting", was a castaway on Desert Island Discs in 1955, and lived close to Broadcasting House. He played little part in the growth of television broadcasting in the 1950s, although he did share interviewing duties with Eamonn Andrews on the film review programme Current Release. In his later years he worked as an occasional actor on such programmes as Dixon of Dock Green and Adam Adamant Lives!, and also as a valet. His last film role was in The Whisperers.

Gamlin was unmarried, and died in 1967 aged 64.
