= David Smart (circus proprietor) =

Co-owner of the British Billy Smart's Circus

David Smart (21 August 1929 - 9 July 2007) was co-owner of Billy Smart's Circus and Windsor Safari Park and a son of Billy Smart Sr. Smart organised the Smart Silver Jubilee Show, in 1977, which was the only circus ever attended by a British monarch and raised millions of pounds in 2016 prices.
