= Donald McCullough (broadcaster) =

William Donald Hamilton McCullough (15 August 1901 – 19 January 1978) was an Irish born British writer and broadcaster. He was the first question-master of The Brains Trust radio programme from its foundation in 1941.

== Career as a writer ==
McCullough first came to public notice in 1934 with Aces Made Easy – or Pons asinorum in a nutshell, which he wrote with illustrations by Fougasse. This was a humorous look at the game of contract bridge, which was then very fashionable in England. He followed this the following year with You Have Been Warned – A Complete Guide to the Road an equally humorous book with the same illustrator. This was written at a time when the introduction could say “According to statistics, there is in Great Britain one car to every 33 persons ...”, so somewhat dated now.

After the war, McCullough and Fougasse again collaborated on light-hearted pamphlets, but with the serious intent of promoting road safety, Fancy Meeting You and Many Happy Returns – and How to Enjoy them

== The Brains Trust ==
The official name of The Brains Trust was initially Any Questions?. McCullough was the first chairman, or “question-master” as the role came to be called. He used the name The Brains Trust from the start of the show in January 1941, and this became its official name in September 1942. The role of question-master was later alternated with others, but McCullough remained a regular until the radio version closed in May 1949.

== Film actor ==
McCullough took a small role in the Flanagan and Allen film Dreaming in 1945.

== Later life ==
McCullough died in Kings Lynn, Norfolk on Jan 19, 1978

== Works ==
- McCullough, W. D. H.; Fougasse (1934). Aces Made Easy. London: Methuen & Co.
- McCullough; Fougasse (1935). You Have Been Warned. London: Methuen & Co.
- McCullough, Donald H. (1948). How to Run a Brains Trust. London: Methuen & Co.
- McCullough, Donald; Fougasse (1949). Question-mark: a Journey Round the World. London: Paul Elek.
