= The Brains Trust =

BBC radio and later television series

The Brains Trust was an informational BBC radio and later television programme in the United Kingdom in the 1940s and 1950s, on which a panel of experts tried to answer questions sent in by the audience.

== History ==
The series was created by BBC producers Howard Thomas and Douglas Cleverdon. The programme started on the Forces radio service on 1 January 1941, the first series under the name Any Questions?, a name later reused for a different radio programme. Renamed The Brains Trust, it continued for 84 weeks continuously from its initial broadcast and became one of the most popular of informational programmes.

Because of its popularity, it was moved to the peak time on Sunday afternoons. It was typically heard by around 29 per cent of the UK population and generated four to five thousand letters each week from the public. During the early war years it helped raise morale, and the verbal sparring between panel members, especially Julian Huxley and Cyril Joad, made it one of the most popular programmes.

Asa Briggs states that the show, along with It's That Man Again, was "the outstanding popular triumph of the war" for BBC radio. The show was one of the most popular radio shows of the time with it receiving 12 million listeners at the height of its popularity.

The radio programme ended in May 1949 and transferred to BBC television in the 1950s. The soundtrack was broadcast on the Home Service during the week following the television broadcast.

The series ended in 1961.

== Revival in the early 2000s ==
The programme enjoyed a brief revival in the late 1990s and early 2000s, when it was broadcast on BBC Radio 3. It was then presented by Joan Bakewell. It featured a variety of guests, including Theodore Zeldin, Ian Stewart, A.S. Byatt, Richard Dawkins and Angela Tilby.

== Members ==
The original three members of the broadcasting team were C. E. M. Joad (philosopher and psychologist), Julian Huxley (biologist) and Commander A. B. Campbell (retired naval officer). The chairman was Donald McCullough.

Later participants included: Edward Andrade, Noel Annan, A. J. Ayer, Michael Ayrton, Isaiah Berlin, Robert Boothby, Jacob Bronowski, Collin Brooks, Violet Bonham Carter, Alan Bullock, Anthony Chenevix-Trench, Kenneth Clark, Margery Fry, Commander Rupert Gould, Gilbert Harding (as chairman), Herbert Hart, Will Hay. Bishop Joost de Blank, Marghanita Laski, C. S. Lewis, Rose Macaulay, John Maud, Malcolm Muggeridge (chairman), Anna Neagle, Egon Ronay, Bertrand Russell, Sir Malcolm Sargent, Hannen Swaffer, Gwyn Thomas (novelist), Geoffrey Crowther (as chairman), Lord Dunsany, Sir Ivone Kirkpatrick, Walter Elliot, Jennie Lee, Ellen Wilkinson, Aldous Huxley, A. J. P. Taylor, Harold Nicolson, Barbara Ward Jackson, Philip Guedalla and Tom Wintringham.

Norman Fisher was a later chairman of the panel.

Hugh Ross Williamson was on the panel on occasion, and was the chairman in 1955.

== Format ==
Listeners or viewers sent in questions on subjects ranging from practical conundrums to moral dilemmas for the panel members to answer. The panellists were chosen for the unique contributions each could bring to the subject matter—from the most erudite and serious to the most irreverent and comedic. One question which has become a classic example of its kind was 'How does a fly land on a ceiling? Does it loop the loop, or what?'. Questions on religion and politics were initially included, but were banned as the programme progressed, following complaints from the Church and Government.

Concern also arose with the BBC itself. One controller, A. P. Ryan, wrote to the Director-General complaining of the programme's political bias. The Controller of Programmes analysed the political attitudes of contributors and calculated a proportion of 25 left-wing and 28 right-wing along with three 'doubtfuls'. He agreed that two of the three regulars, Joad and Huxley, were left-wing. They were also agnostics, a matter of irritation to Dr J. W. Welch, the Director of Religious Broadcasting. In June 1941, the Controller of Programmes instructed the panel to 'avoid all questions involving religion, political philosophy or vague generalities about life'. In June 1942, the Board of Governors reiterated that questions about religion were to be excluded.

The conversation was free-wheeling, unscripted and unrehearsed, relying on the skills of the presenters to fashion cogent responses in the time available. This lent an 'edge-of-the-seat' feel which did much to add to its popularity.

== American version ==
In the early 1960s, an American version of this programme, devised and produced by television producer/director Jeff Smith, aired on WTTW Channel 11, the PBS television outlet in Chicago. Four panellists plus the moderator appeared on each programme. In contrast to the British programme, the questions for the American spin-off were revealed to the team beforehand, so that they could have some time to think about them.

Its original revolving "cast" was Alec Sutherland, Director of Continuing Education at the University of Chicago; Paul Haggerty, a former vaudevillian, musician and raconteur; Robin Pearce, an artist, filmmaker, lecturer on the fine arts and a world traveller; Paul Schilpp, a professor of philosophy at Northwestern University; Dick Applegate, foreign correspondent, TV newsman and commentator.

The cast included Daniel Q. Posin, DePaul University Professor and host of his own television programme on WTTW, Dr. Posin's Universe; Nathan Schwartz, philanthropist and raconteur; Ralph Eisendrath, lawyer and civic leader; and moderator DJR Bruckner, at that time a labour writer for the Chicago Sun Times and for many years after that, a theater critic for The New York Times.

== See also ==
- Does the Team Think…
- Information Please
