= Norman Fisher (educationalist) =

British educationalist

- Born: 9 July 1910
- Died: 1 February 1972 (aged 61)
- Occupation: Educationalist

Norman George Fisher (9 July 1910 – 1 February 1972) was a British educationalist who was at various times Chief Education Officer for the English city of Manchester, head of the staff college of the National Coal Board, and chairman of the panel on the BBC Television question-and-answer show, The Brains Trust.

He appeared as a castaway on the BBC Radio programme Desert Island Discs on 10 August 1959.
