= Windsor Safari Park =

Former British safari park

- Safari Park logo

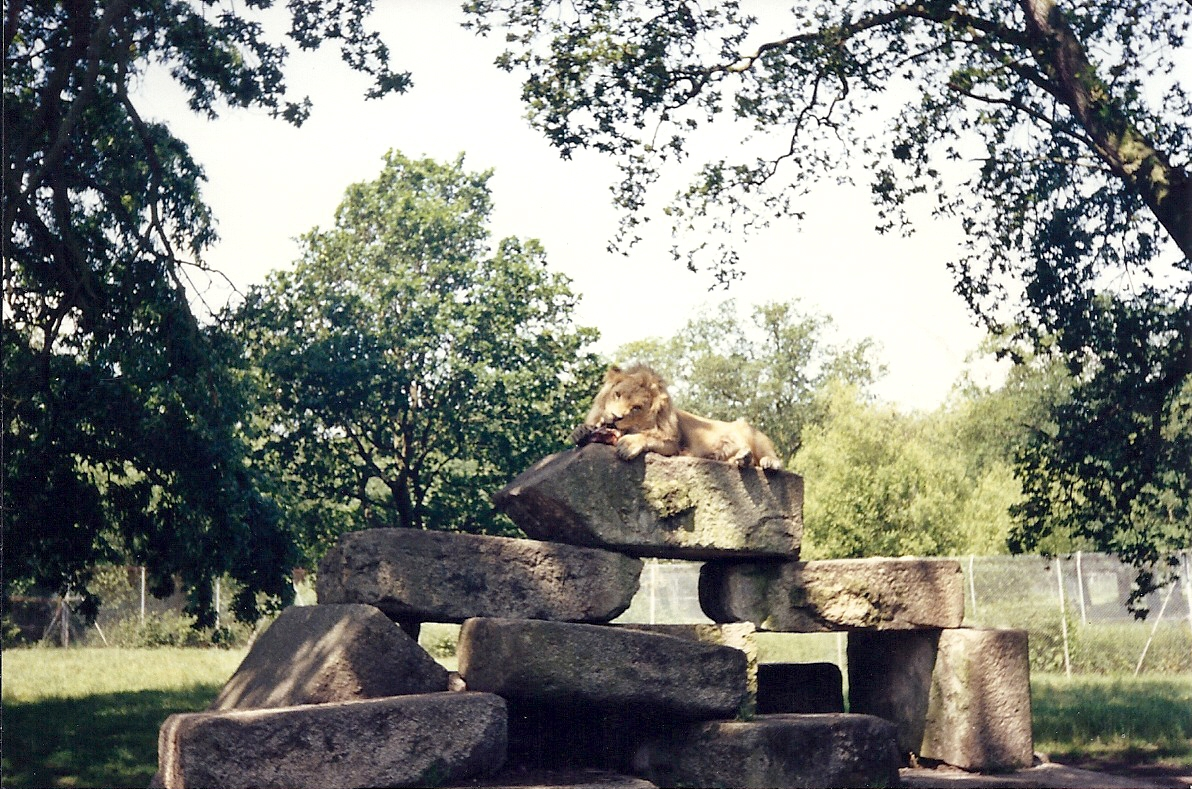
- A lion in the park, 1992
- Interactive map of Windsor Safari Park
- 51.46351°N 0.65114°W
- Date opened: 1969
- Date closed: 1992
- Location: Windsor, Berkshire, England, United Kingdom

Windsor Safari Park was a safari park built on St Leonard's Hill on the outskirts of the town of Windsor in Berkshire, England; it has since been converted into the site of Legoland Windsor. Billed as "The African Adventure", the park included drive-through animal enclosures, aviaries, a dolphinarium and minor theme park rides.

The park's drive-through enclosures featured lions, tigers, bears, cheetahs and baboons. In addition, the park had a Serengeti zone (featuring camels, llamas, giraffes, zebras and buffalo), an elephant enclosure, a hippo lake, chimpanzees, birds of prey, parrots and butterflies. The park closed in 1992.

Windsor Safari Park logo (1980–1987)

Windsor Safari Park shown within Berkshire
(grid reference SU938747)

== History ==
Billy Smart Sr. bought the St.Leonard's Estate in the mid-1960s. After his death, the Royal Windsor Safari Park was founded in 1969 by his sons, the Smart brothers: Billy Smart Jr., David Smart and Ronald Smart. Built on St Leonards Hill in Windsor in Berkshire, England, the 144 acre St Leonards Estate included rolling parkland and the 110-room country house once owned by the American Horace Elgin Dodge Jr. (son of Horace Elgin Dodge of Dodge Motor Cars) and occupied by the Kennedy family during World War II, when Joseph P. Kennedy Sr. was the US ambassador to the UK.

The Safari Park attracted up to 2.5 million visitors per annum, from when it opened. It grew significantly throughout the 1970s and 1980s and was eventually sold to Themes International in 1988. Drive-through natural roaming habitats were created for lions, tigers, bears, cheetahs and baboons. A Serengeti zone was also added (featuring camels, llamas, giraffes, zebras and buffalo), an elephant enclosure, a hippo lake, and a monkey jungle. A key attraction was Seaworld, a dolphinarium complex with dolphins, an orca, penguins and sea lions performing acrobatic displays. Other attractions were the shooting gallery, elephant and turtle rides, education centre, Jeep rides, octopus and riverboat rides, chimpanzee house, road-train, African Arts Centre, and petting zoo.

The first job of the financier Robert Hanson was in the 1970s as an assistant keeper of reptiles at the Safari Park.

=== Receivership ===
Themes International invested £11m developing the business but, after nine years, ran into financial difficulties. The Windsor business, in particular, had experienced dwindling visitor numbers, and the situation was exacerbated by the early 1990s recession and the cost of building an expensive new Egyptian-themed entrance courtyard and similarly themed market streets.

Themes International and the Safari Park entered receivership in January 1992, with debts of £40m and closed shortly afterwards; the expensive new developments were left largely unused.

The park was bought soon afterwards by the Lego Group, whose ambition was to create a Legoland theme park similar to the existing Legoland in Billund, Denmark. The resulting Legoland Windsor opened in 1996.

The dolphins were relocated to Dolfinarium Harderwijk in the Netherlands.

The only attraction that remains from the Safari Park days (aside from the mansion) is the 3 ft 6 in (1,067 mm) gauge funicular railway, now known as the Hill Train, which links The Beginning area of the park to the centre of the park between NINJAGO World and Kingdom of the Pharaohs.
