= Billy Smart Sr. =

English showman and circus owner (1894–1966)

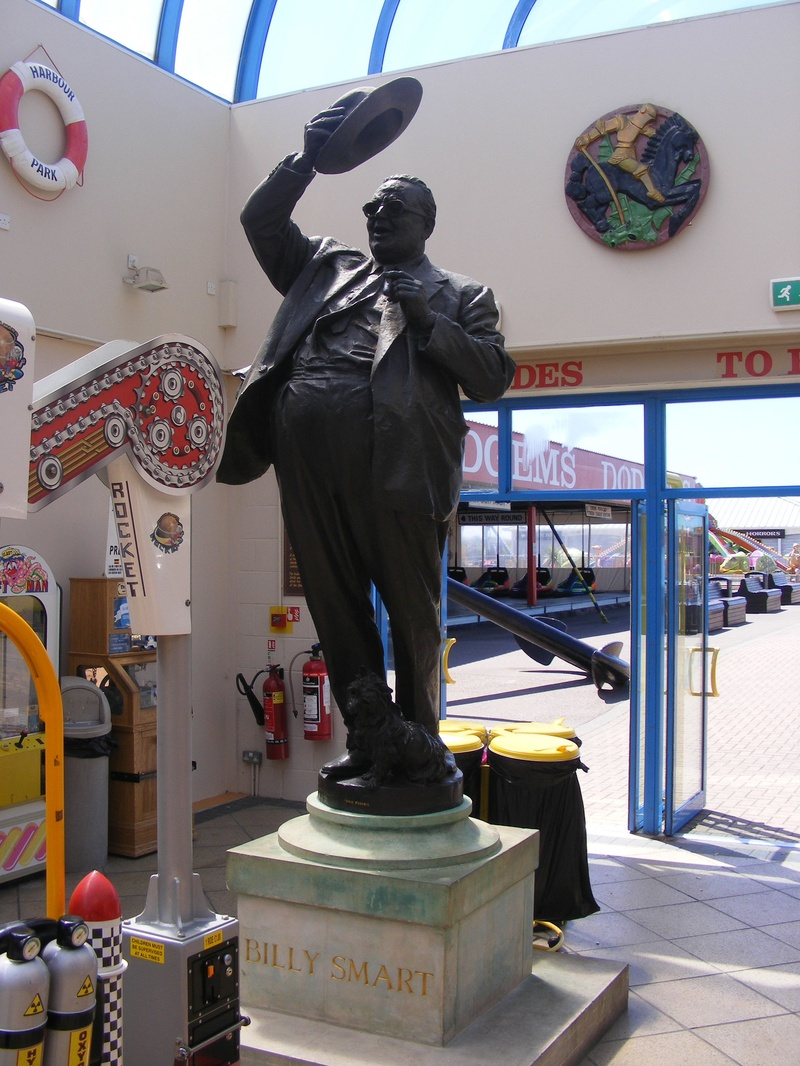
- Statue of Billy Smart at Littlehampton, Sussex
- Born: William George Smart; 25 April 1894; London, England
- Died: 25 September 1966 (aged 72); Ipswich, Suffolk, England
- Occupations: Showman, fairground proprietor, circus proprietor, safari park pioneer, philanthropist
- Years active: 1920-1966
- Known for: Billy Smart's Circus

William George Smart Sr. (25 April 1894 – 25 September 1966) was an English showman, fairground proprietor and circus proprietor, the founder and owner of Billy Smart's Circus.

== Biography ==
Born in London, Billy Smart was one of 23 children in a family that worked on fairgrounds in London and South East England.

After marrying in 1925, he and his brothers set up their own fair, which became a regular attraction in the region. Billy Smart's Fun Fair featured alongside Bertram Mills' Circus at Olympia in 1939 and, during the Second World War, Smart ran several Holiday at Home Fairs, to boost morale.

In 1946, he purchased the big top of Cody's Circus, and opened his own New World Circus. Its first show was in Southall on 5 April 1946. At first, the circus ran in conjunction with the existing funfair, but the latter was phased out by 1952, and Smart's circus toured with a full menagerie of animals. In 1954, the existing big top was replaced by one with a capacity of 6,000 seats, a hippodrome track around the ring, and a grand entrance hall allowing spectacular parades to take place. Smart pioneered centrally-heated dark blue rather than light coloured tents, which had compromised lighting effects.

Smart staged 2 or 3 shows everyday for 9 months of every year from 1946 to the day he died in September 1966. His circus was not only the world's largest travelling show, after Ringing Brothers Barnum & Bailey combined show came off the road, in the 1960s, but also the fastest moving show, from pull down to build up.

Smart arranged for the televising of his circus from 1947, as the first BBC location live TV show. This led to regular Christmas shows on the BBC, including the 1977 Royal Jubilee Big Top Show, organised by his son David Smart, which was attended by Queen Elizabeth II and the Duke of Edinburgh, and raised several million pounds for charity. In the 1960s, the Billy Smart's TV show was the first UK TV programme to attract more than 20 million viewers in the UK. Between 1979 and 1982, the circus was broadcast on ITV.

Billy Smart's New World Circus grew at record breaking speed to become the world's largest travelling circus (i.e. in a tent, rather than in a fixed building), only 15 years after its founding (according to King Pole magazine) with a permanent base at Winkfield, Berkshire. Smart himself took part in his shows, and led many stunts to publicise the circus.

Around 1961, Smart offered £1 million to buy Blackpool Tower, and also headed a consortium hoping to involve Disney in what would have become the first Disney amusement park in Europe; however, the venture did not proceed. Smart then decided upon a novel concept, a safari park (Billy Smart coined the term 'Safari Park'), and, after years of searching for a suitable site, bought a property near Windsor for this purpose. The Windsor Safari Park was brought to fruition by his sons, Ronald, David and Stanley (known as Billy Jr), after his death, and grew to attract up to 2.5 million visitors per year.

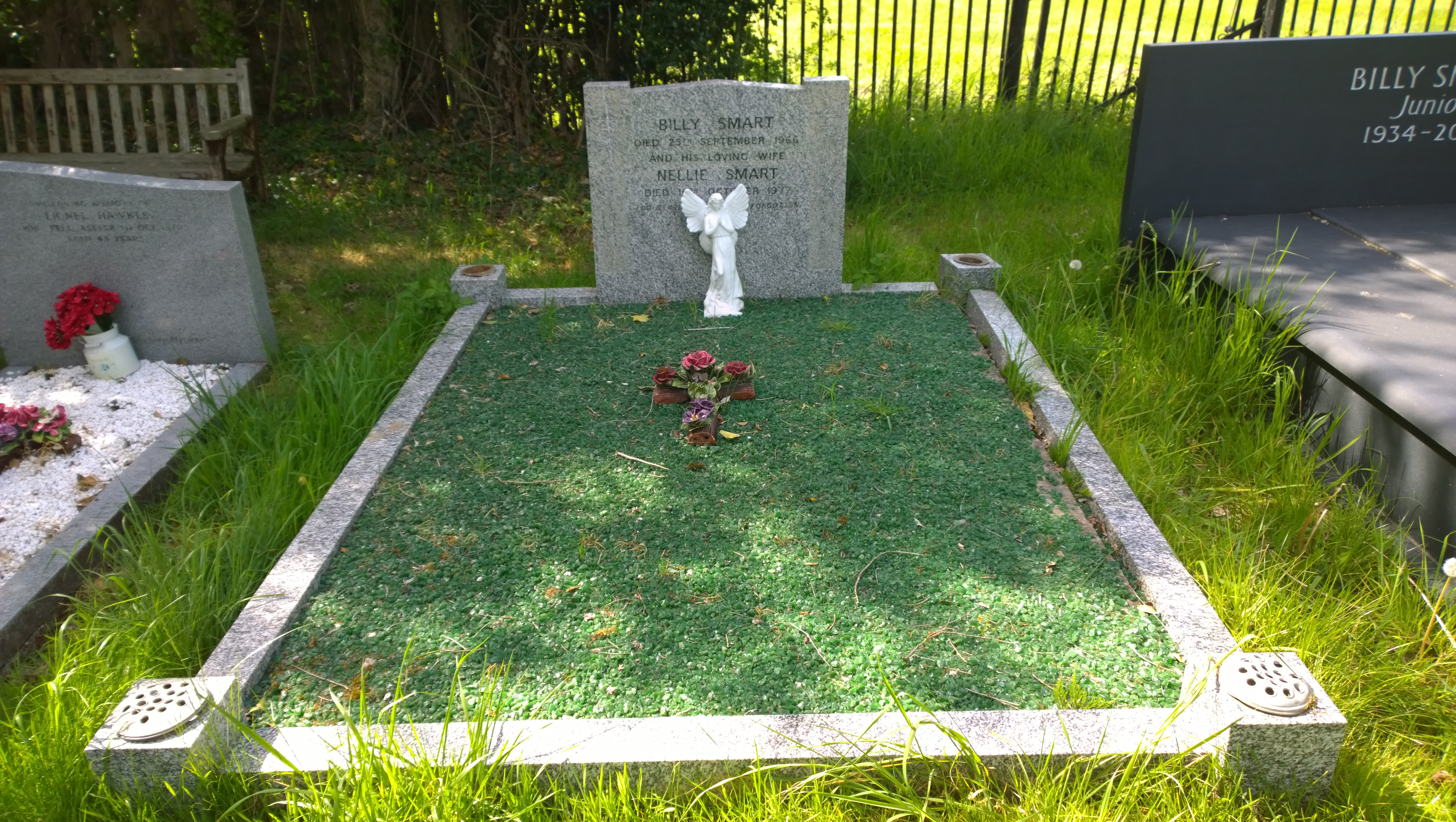
Grave of Billy Smart Sr. at St Peter's Church, Cranbourne, Berkshire

He was the subject of This Is Your Life in 1956 when he was surprised by Eamonn Andrews at the King's Theatre, Hammersmith, London.

Smart died in 1966, in his caravan shortly after conducting a band in front of his circus tent at Ipswich. His friend Sir Billy Butlin described him as "the greatest showman of our time and probably the last of the great showmen."

== Billy Smart’s Circus ==
1946 Founding of Billy Start's New World Circus. First ever Billy Smart's Circus appears at Southall Park with Tommy Handley & starts BBC Radio series I.T.M.A. Circus tours alongside Smart's Funfair.

1940s/1950s Billy Smart is believed to be the first to transport elephants by air, instead of sea.

1950 Enlarged circus travels independently from Funfair.

1951 Brand new circular, 2 pole, Big Top appears. This is an innovation: white canvas on the outside and blue on the interior, enhancing lighting effects. Second BBC broadcast from circus. First of many winter seasons at Bingley Hall, Birmingham.

1952 The Stoney Tribe of real Red Indians, from Canada, appear with the show. (Billy Smart Sr made honorary mayor of Calgary, Canada - TBC.)

1953 New, larger 2 pole tent appears.

1955 Arrival of the 4 pole, all blue Big Top.

1956 ‘The Wild West' major production number first featured in circus on tour. 'Circorama' a series of ten performances, produced for the BBC. 'Circus is home': BBC documentary recorded with commentary by Kay Smart (wife of Ronald Smart, eldest son of Billy Smart).

1956/7 Billy Smart is the subject of ‘This Is Your Life’, a BBC biography programme, presented by Eamonn Andrews.

1958 'Fifty Years a Showman', BBC programme to celebrate Billy Smart's career. Kay Smart guests on Desert Island Discs, a BBC Radio biography programme. 2nd Christmas Day TV broadcast successfully transmitted. New big top, seating 6,000 (in addition to ‘hippodrome’), arrives. Up to 3 performances per day, entertaining up to 18,000 people per day.

1959 The appearance of 'The Arabian Nights' fantasy production number on tour. 'Circus of Horrors' filmed on location at Smart's in London. Gala Charity Circus in aid of Variety Club. Birma, the favourite of the Smart family's 20 elephants, walks over Jayne Mansfield and Tommy Steele. Over the years, people, who lie down on the ground, to be walked over by Birma, include Billy Butlin (of Butlin's Holiday Camps) and John Peel, a well known BBC radio DJ. Jon Pertwee (of ‘Doctor Who’) is ringmaster.

1960 Spinners of the Big Top', devoted to the Billy Smart show and written by Pamela Macgregor Morris, is published. 2nd Variety Club Charity Gala. Billy Smart's Christmas TV Circus broadcast on Christmas Day by BBC, now established as an annual event, continuing until 1977, being the longest running Christmas Day broadcast, (literally) after the Queen's Christmas Address. The BBC award Billy Smart's Circus the 'Silver Camera' for being the first programme ever to attract 20 million viewers.

1961 Billy Smart heads consortium, including Cecil and Sidney Bernstein of Granada Television; Billy Butlin of Butlin's Holiday Camps; Lord Thomson, Canadian and UK media mogul, who owned The Times and The Sunday Times, as well as many other newspapers; and Australian real estate developer Sir Leslie Joseph, in an attempt to build a Disney style theme park in the UK. However, Billy Smart decided that technology was not sufficiently developed for a world class theme park in a part of the world with so much rain. Eventually, a European Disney park opened in the 1990s in (not quite as wet) Paris. Bruce Forsyth hosts a 3rd Variety Club Charity Gala. Billy Smart's Circus now regularly appears on BBC Television at Christmas and Easter. Regularly attracts 20-25 million viewers per televised show, throughout the 1960s and 1970s. First of a series of winter circuses staged at Queen's Hall, Leeds.

1962 H.R.H. Princess Margaret and Lord Snowden attend a Gala Charity performance. Approximately £250,000 (in 2024 prices) raised for N.S.P.C.C.

1965 Stars and Politicians support a charity performance given to 1,000 orphaned children.

1966 Death of Billy Smart at Ipswich. Ipswich Town lowers all public building flags to half mast. Mrs Billy Smart receives a standing ovation at charity circus performance staged at The Royal Albert Hall in aid of National Society for Mentally Handicapped Children. Hollywood actress Joan Crawford joins Billy Smart's Circus for production of the film ‘Berserk’ and does guest ringmistress appearances. ‘Circus of Fears’ movie made with Billy Smart's Circus.

1967 BBC Two broadcast the first ever colour programme on British television: a special production of Billy Smart's Circus. Birma, the elephant, walks over six disc jockeys, from the new BBC Radio One, on BBC TV Christmas Circus.

1968 Special BBC TV production to celebrate 200 years of British Circus.

1970 Critics hail the 1970 touring season as 'the strongest year’. First of three winter seasons staged at Fairfield Hall, Croydon.

1971 Final tour of Billy Smart's Touring Circus. Last performance at Clapham Common in November. Estimated that 100m+ of live audience members had been entertained under Billy Smart's big top by 1971. Smarts continue to record 3 annual circus specials for BBC from Winkfield, near Windsor, UK.

1977 Death of Mrs Billy Smart. Her Majesty Queen Elizabeth II attends Gala TV performance in the Smarts’ Big Top in Windsor. Estimated £1m (in 2024 prices) raised for charity. Performers in this show and other Billy Smart productions, over the years, include Elton John, The Two Ronnies, David Frost, Stanley Baker, Harry Secombe, Olivia Newton-John, Telly Savalas (Kojak), Bobby Moore (England football captain of world cup winners in 1966), Dorothy Squires, Mike Yarwood, Leo Sayer, Gladys Knight & the Pips, Bruce Forsyth, Lulu, Moira Anderson, Charles Aznavour, Pat Boone, Sacha Distel and David Essex.

1978 Billy Smart's TV Circuses now broadcast by ITV at Christmas and Easter.

1980 First of many 'Big Top Variety Show' series recorded under the Billy Smart Big Top for ITV.

1981 The Airey Neave Memorial Trust Thames Television Billy Smart's Variety Show, with contributions from Margaret Thatcher, UK Prime Minister at the time.

1983 Final Television Circus from Billy Smart's Circus broadcast Easter 1983. Estimated that total of 1 billion+ viewers of Billy Smart's television shows, in UK and around the world, by this time.

1986 Auction of remaining circus equipment at Winkfield Winter Quarters, near Windsor. Winter Quarters sold.

== Billy Smart's Circus II by Ward Westley "Gary" Smart, grandson of Billy Smart Sr ==
1993–2014

== Windsor Safari Park (now Legoland Windsor) ==
1965/66 Billy Smart bought the St. Leonards Estate, Windsor, from the Dodge family, of Dodge auto manufacturer. The Kennedy family spent some time living in this house, during the Second World War, when Joseph Kennedy (JFK's father) was United States Ambassador to the United Kingdom, from 1938 until late 1940. In 1969 Princess Margaret (sister of Queen Elizabeth II of England) opens Windsor Safari Park, on behalf of the Smart family. Windsor Safari Park attracts up to 2.5m visitors per year. Many parties in the main house include those attended by The Beatles. One time, Smart cousins were singing “Hey Jude” in the ballroom of the main house, when The Beatles, as a surprise, walked in.

1970s On a private visit, Princes Charles (now King Charles III of England) and Andrew (middle son of Queen Elizabeth II of England) visited Windsor Safari Park, to swim with the family killer whale, accompanied by Ward Westley (Gary) Smart (son of Ronald (Ronnie) Smart, eldest son of Billy Smart Sr). The Smart family sells Ramu III killer whale to SeaWorld, USA. Believed to be first adult killer whale flown across the Atlantic Ocean.

1977 Billy Smart Jr, Ronnie Smart and David Smart sell Windsor Safari Park in 1977 and, after different owners, Windsor Safari Park is converted into Legoland Windsor, in the 1990s.

== Family ==
- Peggy Smart
- Ena Smart
- Ronnie Smart
- Hazel Smart
- Pyllis Smart
- Dolly Smart
- David Smart, son, circus performer and circus director
- Billy Smart Jr., son, circus performer and circus director*
- Hazel Smart
- Rosie Smart

== Sources ==
- David Jamieson, Billy Smart's Circus, A Pictorial History. Buntingford, Aardvark Publishing, 2004. (ISBN 1-872904-26-2)
- "Spinners of the Big Top" by Pamela Macgregor-Morris
