= Vivian De Gurr St George =

English shoeblack

- Born: 11 March 1895; British India
- Died: June 1979 (aged 84); Camden, London, England
- Occupations: Author; Shoeblack

Vivian De Gurr St George (11 March 1895 – June 1979) was an English shoeblack who worked at Piccadilly Circus, London, England. He became well-known though the publication of his autobiography, St. George of Piccadilly, in 1953, and his radio appearances.

Educated at a private school, he left home as a teenager, and travelled the world, returning with a wife, Consuelo (a nurse), and family, before setting up as a shoeblack.

He appeared as a castaway on the BBC Radio programme Desert Island Discs on 24 September 1954. He died in June 1979 at the age of 84 in Camden, London.

== Bibliography ==
- St. George of Piccadilly. Werner Laurie. 1953.
- By Appointment.
