= Fougasse (cartoonist) =

British cartoonist

Bird in 1934.

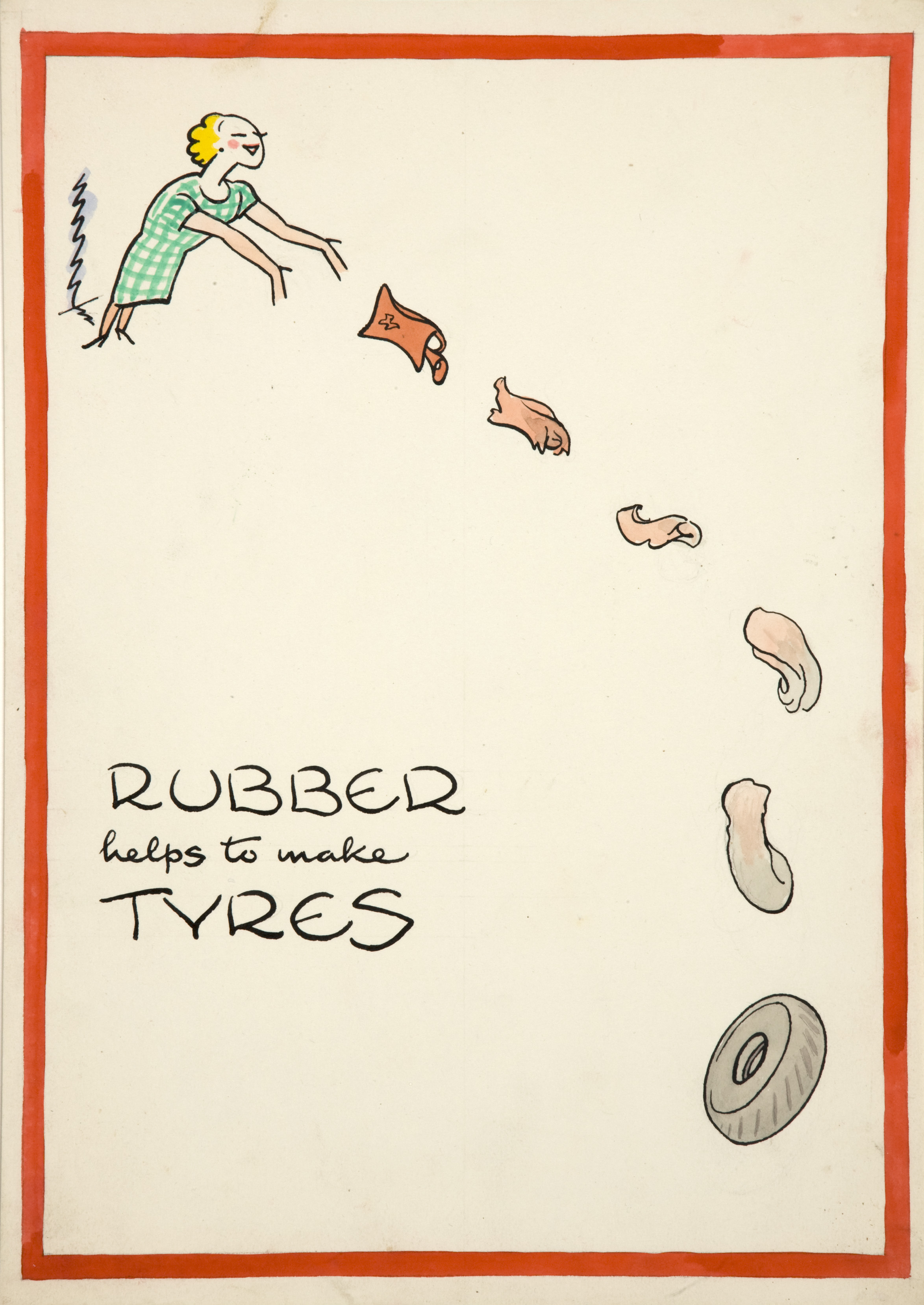
World War II propaganda poster by Fougasse

Cyril Kenneth Bird CBE (17 December 1887 – 11 June 1965), known by the pen name Fougasse, was a British cartoonist.

He was perhaps best known for his work in Punch magazine (of which he served as editor from 1949 to 1953) and his World War II warning propaganda posters; "Careless talk costs lives" was one of the most popular. He also designed many posters for the London Underground.

== Early life ==
Bird was born in London on 17 December 1887, the son of Arthur Bird, a company director. He was educated at Cheltenham College and King's College London (B.Sc.). While at King's College he attended evening art classes at the Regent Street Polytechnic and at the School of Photo-Engraving in Bolt Court.

He was seriously injured at the Battle of Gallipoli during World War I and invalided out of the British Army.

== Career ==
Bird first contributed to Punch in 1916, while convalescing, and also contributed to several other British newspapers and magazines, including the Graphic and Tatler. His pen name was based on the fougasse, a type of mine.

As one of the best known cartoonists of the time, he was one of 170 authors who created doll-sized books exclusively for Queen Mary's Dolls' House; his illustrated verse tale, written on postage stamp-sized pages, was published as a regular-sized hardback in 2012 by the Royal Collection and Walker Books.

In the course of the 1920s and 1930s, his drawings evolved from the traditionally representational to an innovative, spare, style that was both unique and popular, featuring in many advertising campaigns as well as in magazine editorial. He became art editor of Punch from 1937 to 1949, then editor until 1953. He was the only cartoonist ever to edit the magazine. During World War II, he worked unpaid for the Ministry of Information, designing humorous but effective propaganda posters including the famous "Careless Talk Costs Lives" series. For this work he was awarded the honour of Commander of the Order of the British Empire in 1946. In 1951 he was elected as Master of the Art Workers' Guild.

He illustrated and co-wrote several humorous books with W. D. H. McCullough. These included the very successful Aces Made Easy – or Pons asinorum in a nutshell, on the subject of contract bridge, in 1934, and You Have Been Warned – A Complete Guide to the Road, in 1935.

In the mid-1950s, he taught at the Christian Science Sunday School in the Sloane Square church, which has since been converted into the Cadogan Hall concert hall. He died in London, aged 77.

== Legacy ==
Since 2009 his cartoon of a butler carrying a tray has been used to illustrate the front page of British Airways' First Class menus, continuing an association with the airline which goes back to the 1930s when Fougasse penned advertising posters for BA's forerunner, Imperial Airways.

== Personal life ==
Bird married Mary Holden Caldwell on 16 September 1914.
