= Billy Smart Jr. =

British animal trainer and circus impresario (1934–2005)

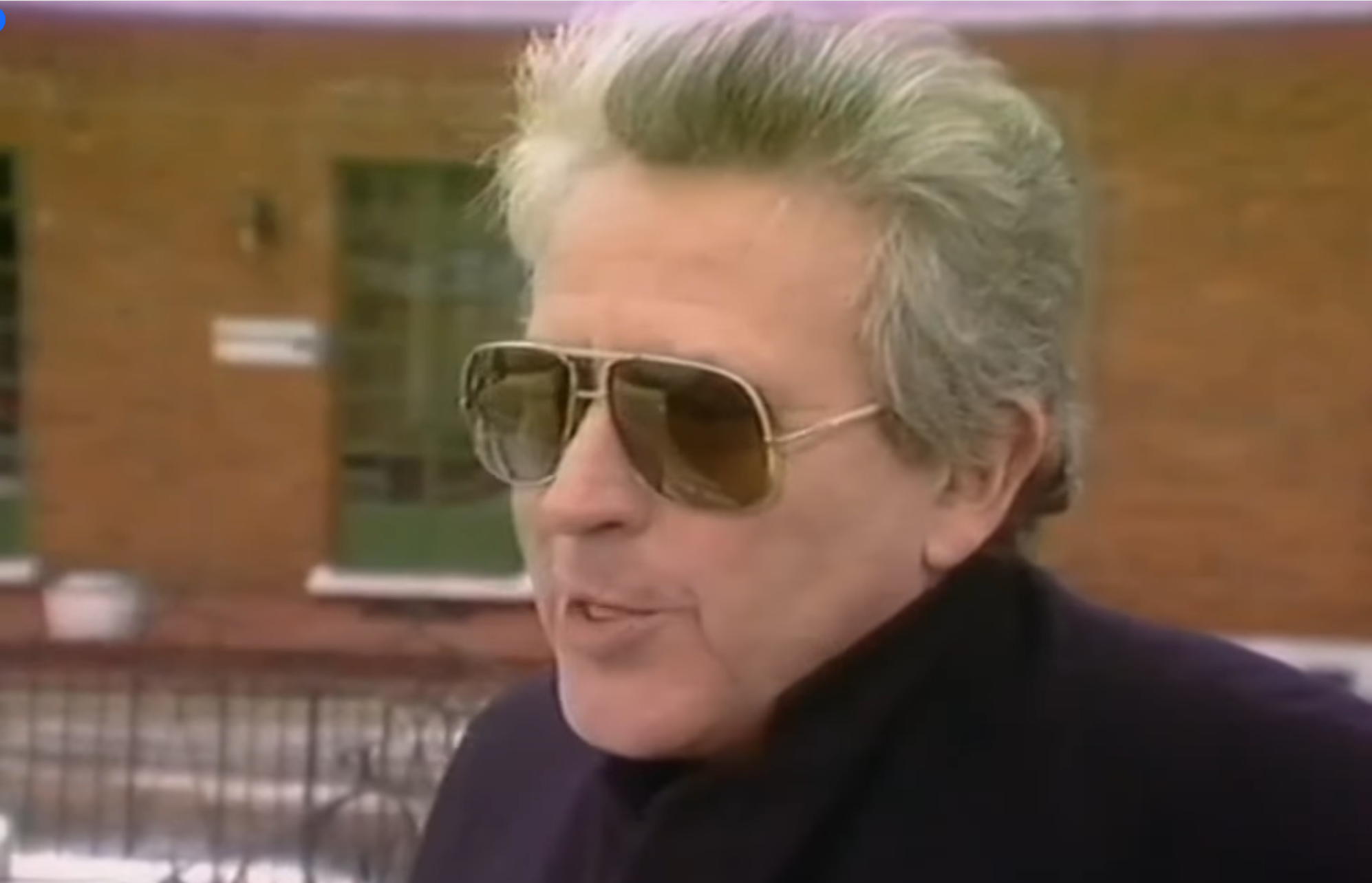
Billy Smart Jr outside Billy Smart's Winkfield Zoo, Windsor, England, shortly prior to the sale of Billy Smart's Circus equipment and costumes in 1986. This still screenshot was taken during TV News Interview from YouTube, while Billy Smart Jr answers questions about his imminent emigration from the UK

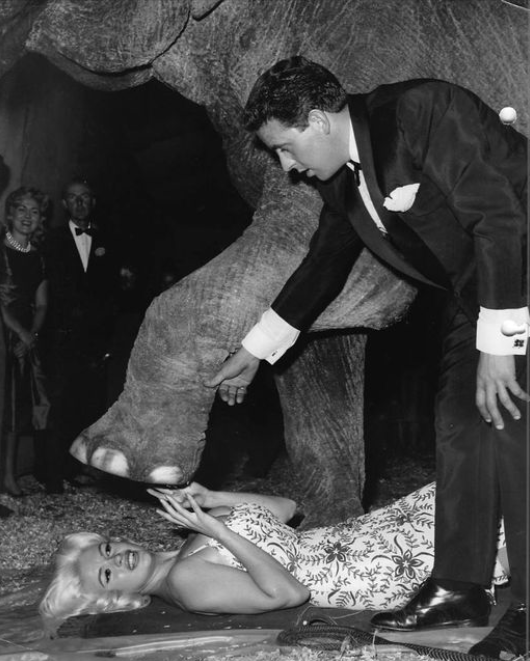
Billy Smart Jr, elephant and American actress Jayne Mansfield, in 1960s

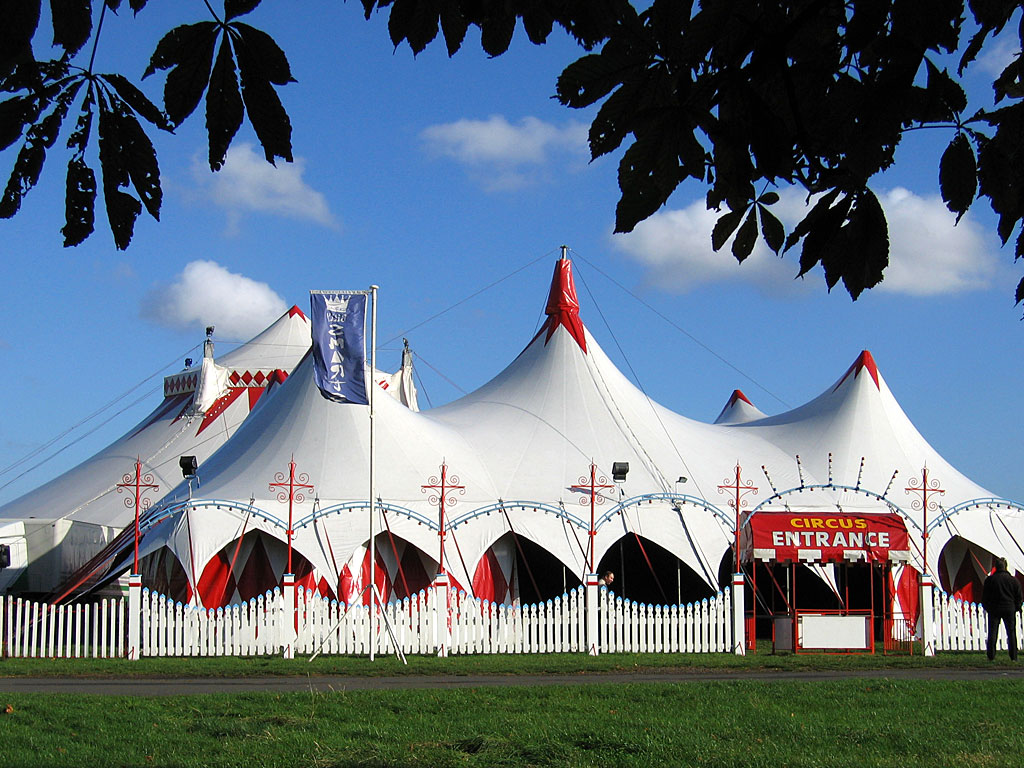
The Big Top of Billy Smart's Circus, Cambridge, 2004.

Billy Smart Jr. (born Stanley Smart, 15 October 1934 – 23 May 2005) was a British circus performer and impresario.

== Biography ==
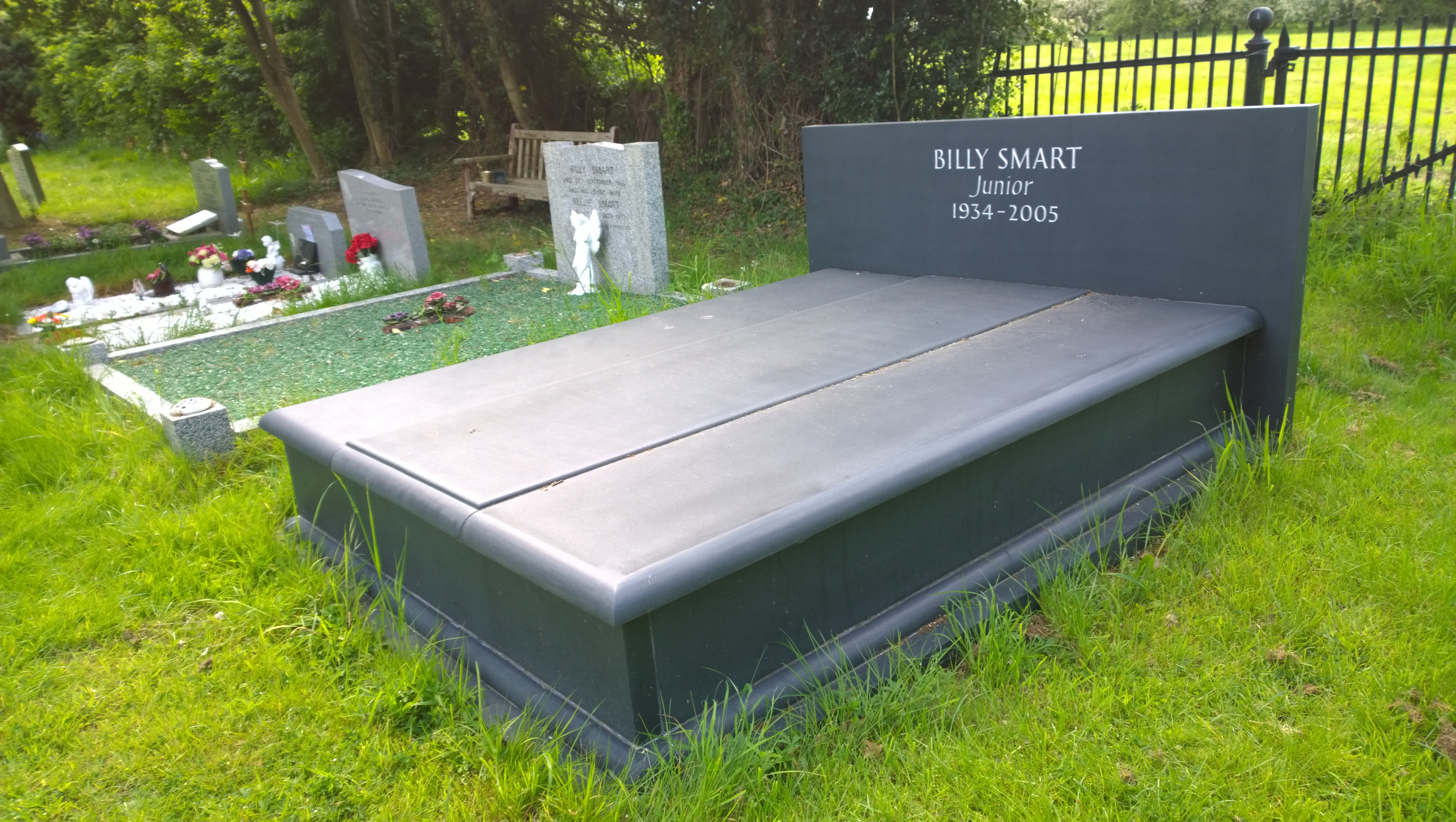
Grave of Billy Smart Jr. at St Peter's Church, Cranbourne, Berkshire

Smart, whose given name was Stanley (but, as his eldest brother, Billy Jr, died prematurely, was known as Billy Jr from childhood, eventually changing his name, from Stanley to Billy, by deed poll, in 1977), was the tenth (and youngest) surviving child and third surviving son of Billy Smart Sr.

Billy Smart Jr would travel with the circus and go to local schools, when at a location for a lengthy period. One school was 'All Saints' at Blackheath, London, in 1958, the heath being a regular location for the circus. At other times, Smart was educated by tutors in a mobile classroom.

The first appearance of the Billy Smart's Circus was on 5 April at Southall Park in Middlesex. The circus toured alongside Smart's funfair.

Smart made his circus debut with "Billy Smart's New World Circus" as assistant ringmaster aged 12. He was soon performing with ponies and horses, but became best known later for his elephant acts, with up to 20 elephants in the ring.

At its peak, Billy Smart's four-masted Big Top could hold over 6,000 people, with a show including hundreds of animals and performers.

Smart, together with his brothers, Ronald Smart and David Smart, took over management of the circus when their father died in 1966 at Ipswich.

The circus ceased touring in 1971, but televised performances continued until 1983, drawing audiences of up to 22 million at its height. The Smart Brothers also developed Guernsey Zoo, selling it in 1972, and opened Windsor Safari Park in 1969 before selling it in 1977 (it is now the site of Legoland Windsor).

Smart lost the sight in his right eye in 1978 after cosmetic surgery severed the optic nerve, ending his career as an animal trainer.

In 1985, the Smart circus Winkfield winter quarters were sold.

The "Billy Smart's" touring circus was revived by his brother Ronald and nephew Gary in 1993, but Smart concentrated on a second career as a property developer, based in Spain.

== In popular culture ==
In the Netherlands, Billy Smart was known for the annual "Billy Smart's Kinderkerstcircus" ("Billy Smart's Children Christmas Circus") TV broadcast. Dutch singer Fay Lovsky listed Billy Smart in her 1981 hit "Christmas Was A Friend of Mine" as one of her favourite Christmas traditions.

"Circus of Horrors" (1960), directed by Sydney Hayers, was filmed in Billy Smarts Circus. In the picture, it was called the "Schuler" circus. It was used in the film Berserk! (1967), starring Joan Crawford and Diana Dors. In the movie the circus was called the Great Rivers Circus.

== Abbreviated History of Billy Smart’s New World Circus and Royal Windsor Safari Park ==
=== Billy Smart’s Circus ===
1946

- Founding of Billy Start's New World Circus by Billy Smart Sr.
- First ever Billy Smart’s Circus appears at Southall Park with Tommy Handley & starts BBC Radio series ITMA
- Circus tours alongside Smart’s Funfair.

1940s/1950s

- Billy Smart Sr is believed to be the first to transport elephants by air, instead of sea.

1950

- Enlarged circus travels independently from Funfair.

1951

- Brand new circular, 2 pole, Big Top appears.
- This is an innovation: white canvas on the outside and blue on the interior, enhancing lighting effects.
- 2nd BBC broadcast from circus.
- First of many winter seasons at Bingley Hall, Birmingham.

1952

- The Stoney Tribe of real Red Indians, from Canada, appear with the show. (Billy Smart Sr made honorary mayor of Calgary, Canada - TBC.)

1953

- New, larger 2 pole tent appears.

1955

- Arrival of the 4 pole, all blue Big Top.

1956

- ‘The Wild West' major production number first featured in circus on tour. 'Circorama' a series of ten performances, produced for the BBC.
- 'Circus is home': BBC documentary recorded with commentary by Kay Smart (wife of Ronald Smart, eldest son of Billy Smart Sr).

1956/7

- Billy Smart Sr is the subject of ‘This Is Your Life’, a BBC biography programme, presented by Eamonn Andrews.

1958

- 'Fifty Years a Showman', BBC programme to celebrate Billy Smart Sr's career.
- Kay Smart guests on 'Desert Island Discs', a BBC Radio biography programme.
- 2nd Christmas Day TV broadcast successfully transmitted.
- New big top, seating 6,000 (in addition to ‘hippodrome’), arrives. Up to 3 performances per day, entertaining up to 18,000 people per day.

1959

- The appearance of 'The Arabian Nights' fantasy production number on tour.
- 'Circus of Horrors' filmed on location at Smart's in London.
- Gala Charity Circus in aid of Variety Club.
- Birma, the favourite of the Smart family’s 20 elephants, walks over Jayne Mansfield and Tommy Steele.
- Over the years, people, who lie down on the ground, to be walked over by Birma, include Billy Butlin (of Butlin’s Holiday Camps) and John Peel, a well known BBC radio DJ.
- Jon Pertwee (of Doctor Who) is ringmaster.

1960

- 'Spinners of the Big Top', devoted to the Billy Smart show and written by Pamela Macgregor Morris, is published.
- 2nd Variety Club Charity Gala.
- Billy Smart's Christmas TV Circus broadcast on Christmas Day by BBC, now established as an annual event, continuing until 1977, being the longest running Christmas Day broadcast, after the Queen’s Christmas Address.
- BBC award Billy Smart’s Circus the 'Silver Camera' for being the first programme ever to attract 20 million viewers.

1961

- Billy Smart Sr heads consortium, including Cecil and Sidney Bernstein of Granada Television, Billy Butlin of Butlin’s Holiday Camps, Lord Thomson, Canadian and UK media mogul, who owned The Times and The Sunday Times, as well as many other newspapers, and Australian real estate developer Sir Leslie Joseph, in an attempt to build a Disney style theme park in the UK.
- However, Billy Smart Sr decided that technology was not sufficiently developed for a world class theme park in a part of the world with so much rain.
- Eventually, a European Disney park opened in the 1990s in (not quite as wet) Paris.
- Bruce Forsyth hosts a 3rd Variety Club Charity Gala.
- Billy Smart's Circus now regularly appears on BBC Television at Christmas and Easter. Regularly attracts 20-25 million viewers per televised show, throughout the 1960s and 1970s.
- First of a series of winter circuses staged at Queen's Hall, Leeds.

1962

- Princess Margaret and Lord Snowdon attend a Gala Charity performance.
- Approximately £250,000 (adjusted for inflation, 2024) raised for NSPCC

1965

- Stars and Politicians support a charity performance given to 1,000 orphaned children.

1966

- Death of Billy Smart Sr at Ipswich.
- Ipswich Town lowers all public building flags to half mast.
- Mrs Billy Smart Sr receives a standing ovation at charity circus performance staged at The Royal Albert Hall in aid of National Society for Mentally Handicapped Children.
- Hollywood actress Joan Crawford joins Billy Smart’s Circus for production of the film ‘Berserk’ and does guest ringmistress appearances. ‘Circus of Fears’ movie made with Billy Smart’s Circus.

1967

- BBC Two broadcast the first ever colour programme on British television: a special production of Billy Smart's Circus.
- Birma the elephant walks over six disc jockeys, from the new BBC Radio One, on BBC TV Christmas Circus.

1968

- Special BBC TV production to celebrate 200 years of British Circus.

1970

- Critics hail the 1970 touring season as 'the strongest year’. First of three winter seasons staged at Fairfield Hall, Croydon.

1971

- Final tour of Billy Smart's Touring Circus.
- Last performance at Clapham Common in November.
- Estimated that 100m+ of live audience members had been entertained under Billy Smart’s big top by 1971.
- Billy Smart Jr, Ronald Smart and David Smart continue to record 3 annual circus specials for BBC from Winkfield, near Windsor, UK.

1977

- Death of Mrs Billy Smart Sr.
- Queen Elizabeth II attends Gala TV performance in the Smarts’ Big Top in Windsor.
- Estimated £1m (adjusted for inflation, 2024) raised for charity.
- Performers in this show and other Billy Smart productions, over the years, include Elton John, The Two Ronnies, David Frost, Joan Crawford, Stanley Baker, Jon Pertwee (as Doctor Who), Harry Secombe, Olivia Newton-John, Telly Savalas (Kojak), Bobby Moore (England football captain of world cup winners in 1966), Dorothy Squires, Mike Yarwood, Leo Sayer, Gladys Knight & the Pips, Bruce Forsyth, Lulu, Moira Anderson, Charles Aznavour, Pat Boone, Sacha Distel and David Essex.

1978

- Billy Smart's TV Circuses now broadcast by ITV at Christmas and Easter.

1980

- First of many 'Big Top Variety Show' series recorded under the Billy Smart Big Top for ITV.

1981

- The Airey Neave Memorial Trust Thames Television Billy Smart’s Variety Show, with contributions, including those of Margaret Thatcher, UK Prime Minister at the time.

1983

- Final televised show from Billy Smart's Circus broadcast Easter 1983. Estimated that total of 1 billion+ viewers of Billy Smart’s Circus, in UK and around the world, in 36 years of televised shows.

1986

- Auction of remaining circus equipment at Winkfield Winter Quarters, near Windsor.
- Winter Quarters sold (for £20m, adjusted for inflation, 2024).

=== Windsor Safari Park (now Legoland Windsor) ===
1965/66

- Billy Smart Sr bought the St. Leonards Estate, Windsor, from the Dodge family, of Dodge auto manufacturer.
- The Kennedy family spent some time living in this house (in order to avoid the London focused Blitz), during the Second World War, when Joseph Kennedy (John F. Kennedy's father) was United States Ambassador to the United Kingdom, from 1938 until late 1940.
- In 1969 Princess Margaret opens Windsor Safari Park, on behalf of the Smart family.
- Windsor Safari Park attracts up to 2.5m visitors per year.
- Many parties in the main house include those attended by The Beatles. One time, Smart cousins were singing “Hey Jude” in the ballroom of the main house, when The Beatles, as a surprise, walked in.

1970s

- On a private visit, Prince Charles (now King Charles III) and Prince Andrew visited Windsor Safari Park, to swim with the family killer whale, accompanied by Ward Westley (Gary) Smart (son of Ronald (Ronnie) Smart, eldest brother of Billy Smart Jr).
- The Smart family sells Ramu III killer whale to SeaWorld, USA. Believed to be first adult killer whale flown across the Atlantic Ocean.

1977

- Billy Smart Jr, Ronnie Smart and David Smart sell Windsor Safari Park in 1977 (for £30m, adjusted for inflation, 2024) and, after a series of different owners, Windsor Safari Park is converted into Legoland Windsor in the 1990s.
